= The Road to Freedom (newspaper) =

The Road to Freedom Шлях до волі Путь к свободе
- Type: Monthly (April-July 1919; July-November 1920); Daily (September-December 1919)
- Founder: Nestor Makhno
- Publisher: Military Revolutionary Council
- Editor-in-chief: Peter Arshinov
- Deputy editor: Volin, Aron Baron
- Founded: 17 May 1919
- Ceased publication: 26 November 1920
- Political alignment: Anarchism
- Language: Russian, Ukrainian
- City: Huliaipole (April-July 1919; July-November 1920); Katerynoslav (September-December 1919)

The Road to Freedom (Russian: Путь к Свободе, romanized: Put' k Svobode; Ukrainian: Шлях до Волі, romanized: Sliakh do Voli) was the main newspaper of the Makhnovist movement, publishing 50 issues from May 1919 to November 1920.

== History ==
Following the Second Regional Congress of Peasants, Workers and Insurgents, in March 1919, the Makhnovist movement began to publish its own newspapers. These included the Izvestia of the Military Revolutionary Council and the Nabat, which were published in the Russian language by members of the Nabat Confederation from Kharkiv. These publications were printed with financial support from the Makhnovshchina, which caused relations between the Nabat and the movement's leader Nestor Makhno to strain.

In April 1919, Peter Arshinov arrived in Huliaipole and began publication of The Road to Freedom, which became established as the main organ of the Makhnovshchina. As the military situation changed, the newspaper's headquarters were transferred to Oleksandrivsk and Katerynoslav. Writing in the paper himself, Makhno declared that the newspaper's role was to counter the anti-anarchist material in the Bolshevik press:

The Road to Freedom, will ring the alarm, echoing throughout the world in favour of freedom and popular justice, for a society where there will be no authorities, or laws written by them, where in the free, boundless depths of the earth, man will be man, and conscience and freedom will be the marks of the human world.

During its first run in the spring of 1919, the newspaper managed to publish three issues, each with a Mikhail Bakunin quote in their headers. Over the subsequent months, the newspaper published a proclamation that denounced the rebel leader Nykyfor Hryhoriv and Arshinov was joined on the editorial board by members of the Nabat, including Volin and Aron Baron.

Following the insurgent victory in the battle of Peregonovka, the Makhnovshchina took control of much of southern Ukraine. The reconstituted Military Revolutionary Council resumed publication of The Road to Freedom in Katerynoslav, where it published issues 4 to 42 of the newspaper, printed the movement's Draft Declaration. and published calls for the institution of workers' self-management in the region.

In October 1919, the movement began publishing a Ukrainian language edition of The Road to Freedom (Ukrainian: Шлях до Волі, romanized: Sliakh do Voli), in order to communicate more effectively with the Ukrainian masses. At this time, both editions of The Road to Freedom shared a building with Borotby. Its authors usually published their articles under pseudonyms. The newspapers were sold at different prices to people of different social classes. The young activists that distributed them encouraged readers to continue circulating them, rather than throwing them away, and pasted them onto the walls of train stations.

The Makhnovshchina also proclaimed freedom of speech and freedom of the press for all left-wing publications, including Bolshevik and Socialist Revolutionary newspapers, but only The Road to Freedom was authorised to published military communications. On 21 November 1919, The Road to Freedom published an article that called for the Revolutionary Insurgent Army of Ukraine to take steps to prepare for the outbreak of conflict with the approaching Red Army. Following the fall of Katerynoslav on 9 December 1919, The Road to Freedom ceased publication again.

When it was relaunched on 5 July 1920, it published an article which declared that the Insurgent Army was not specifically anarchist, but merely reflected the aspirations of the peasant masses, which it swore to defend from both the Reds and the Whites. The article claimed that while anarchists were working within the army to bring it closer in line with anarchist principles, but due to the situation of the war and a widespread lack of ideological motivation among the peasantry, little progress had been made.

The newspaper also publicly issued the insurgent response to a proposed alliance by Pyotr Wrangel. Despite printing their rejection, rumours of the alliance continued to circulate in both Red and White newspapers. Even after the ratification of the Starobilsk agreement between the Makhnovists and Bolsheviks, which Makhno defended as militarily necessary, he also published declarations in The Road to Freedom refusing to recognise the authority of the Soviet government.

Following the siege of Perekop in November 1920, the Red Army attacked the Makhnovshchina, bringing an end to the publication of The Road to Freedom after 50 issues. Few issues of the Russian edition and only issue 9 of the Ukrainian edition were found to have been preserved. Some issues of the newspaper were reportedly found in the Soviet archives.

== Bibliography ==
- Darch, Colin (2020). Nestor Makhno and Rural Anarchism in Ukraine, 1917–21. London: Pluto Press. ISBN 978-0745338880. OCLC 1225942343.
- Malet, Michael (1982). Nestor Makhno in the Russian Civil War. London: Palgrave Macmillan. ISBN 0-333-25969-6. OCLC 1194667963.
- Skirda, Alexandre (2004) [1982]. Nestor Makhno: Anarchy's Cossack. Translated by Sharkey, Paul. Edinburgh: AK Press. ISBN 1-902593-68-5. OCLC 58872511.
