= Draft Declaration =

Draft Declaration may refer to:

- Drafting of the Universal Declaration of Human Rights, the process of writing the UDHR
- Draft Declaration of the Revolutionary Insurgent Army of Ukraine, a Ukrainian anarchist manifesto
- Draft Declaration on the Rights of Indigenous Peoples
