= Makhnovist ruble =

Historical currency

Махновський рубель (Ukrainian)
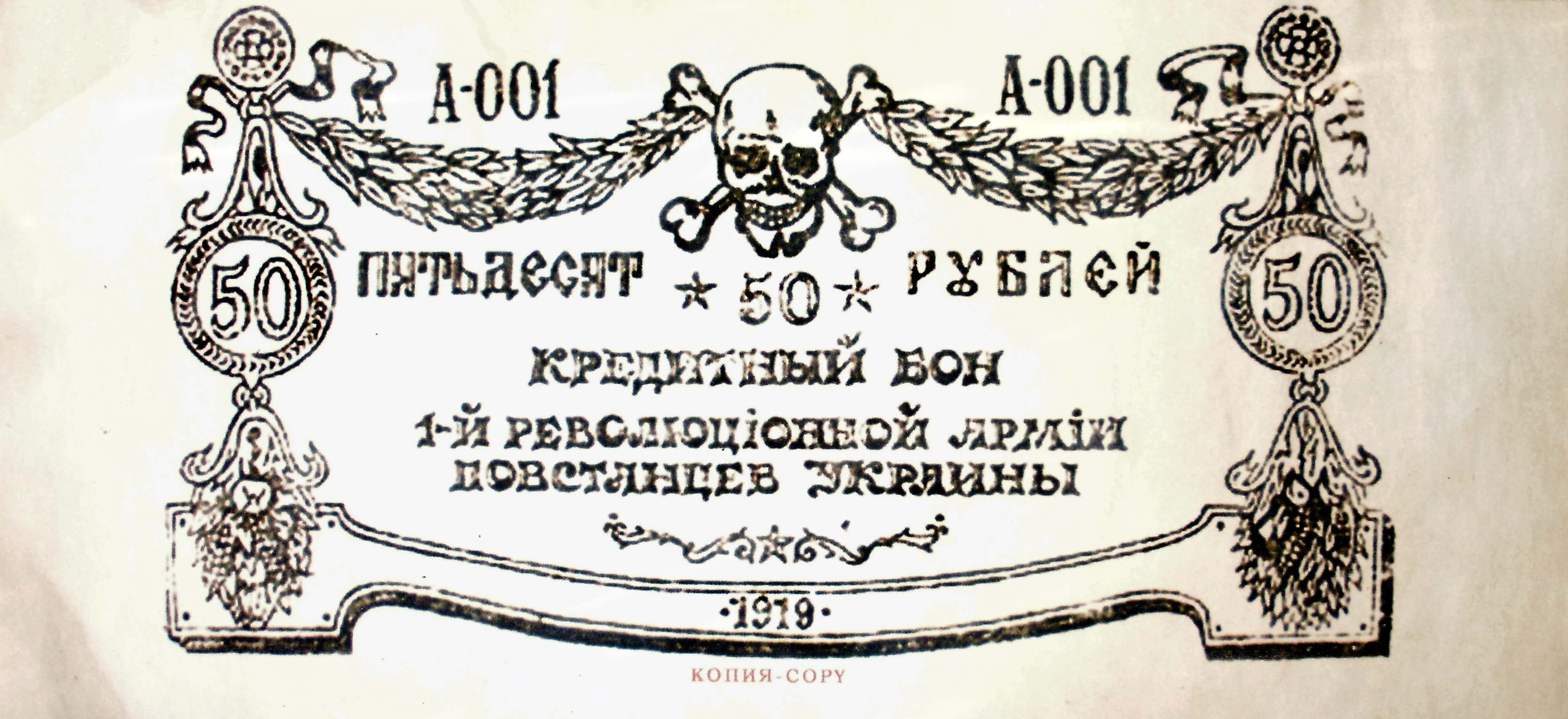

Denominations
- Banknotes
- Freq. used: 1, 3, 5, 10, 25, 50, 100, 250, 500, 1000 rubles.

Demographics
- Date of introduction: 1919
- User(s): Makhnovshchina

The Makhnovist ruble was a banknote issued by the Revolutionary Insurgent Army of Ukraine, during the Ukrainian War of Independence, in the territory of the Makhnovshchina.

The Makhnovist ruble was produced by overprinting various banknotes of the states of the former Russian Empire, most often on the Don ruble issued by the Rostov office of the Don Republic's State Bank. There were a significant number of types of overprints. Some of them increased the denomination of banknotes by 10 times, others, which did not change the denomination of banknotes, carried the name of the Insurgent Army or its subdivision, or campaign and other texts. The Makhnovists did not issue their own paper banknotes. Full-fledged banknotes, allegedly printed and issued by the Insurgent Army, were found to be counterfeit.

The issuing of banknotes by the Makhnovshchina was noted by the Ukrainian People's Army, which reported in July 1920 that the Makhnovists were issuing banknotes worth 1,000 Ukrainian karbovanets, as well as the American journalist William Henry Chamberlin, who later reported that the notes bore a message stating that nobody would be prosecuted for forging the currency. Another banknote's reverse was reported to have stated: "Hey, chum, stop worrying! The smart money is on Makhno!" Colin Darch noted that reports of the Makhnovist banknotes were probable, as there was a systemic lack of legal tender due to the war, which had resulted in over 350 alternative currencies circulating throughout the former Russian Empire. However, Nestor Makhno's wife Halyna Kuzmenko disputed the existence of any Makhnovist currency, dismissing reports as "fairy tales and inventions, stories and legends created by people’s fancies."

== See also ==
- Soviet ruble
- Ukrainian hryvnia
