= The Unknown Revolution =

1947 anarchist history of the Russian revolution

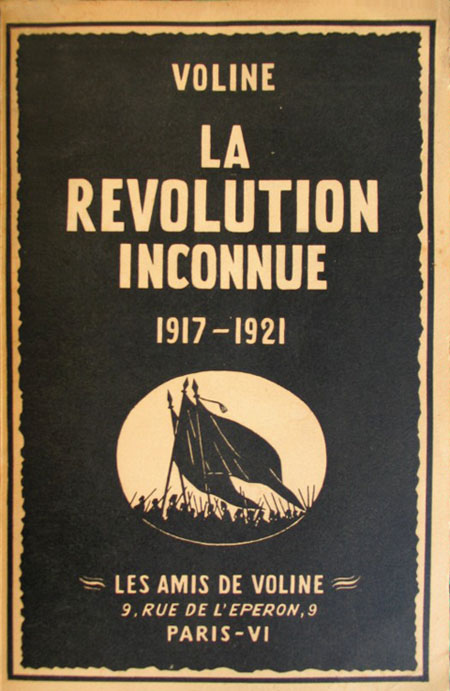
- Author: Voline
- Subject: Russian history
- Publication date: 1947

The Unknown Revolution is a 1947 history of the Russian Revolution by Volin.

== Publication ==
Voline finished the book in 1940 while in Marseille. After his death in 1945, it was first published posthumously in 1947. Following 1968 events in France, the book was republished in French paperback without additional editorial content by Pierre Belfond as part of a series by Daniel Guérin and Jean-Jacques Lebel.

The book was translated into English in two parts by the Libertarian Book Club. The first volume, Nineteen-Seventeen: The Russian Revolution Betrayed, in 1954, and the second volume, The Unknown Revolution: Kronstadt 1921, Ukraine 1918–21, in 1956.

== Reception and legacy ==
Historian of anarchism Paul Avrich wrote that Voline's book was "the most important anarchist history of the Russian Revolution in any language".

== Bibliography ==
- Avrich, Paul (1988). "V. M. Eikhenbaum (Volin): The Man and His Book". Anarchist Portraits. Princeton, New Jersey: Princeton University Press. pp. 125–134. ISBN 0-691-04753-7. OCLC 17727270.
