= Military Revolutionary Council =

De facto executive of the Makhnovshchina (1919–1920)

- Военно-революционный Совет
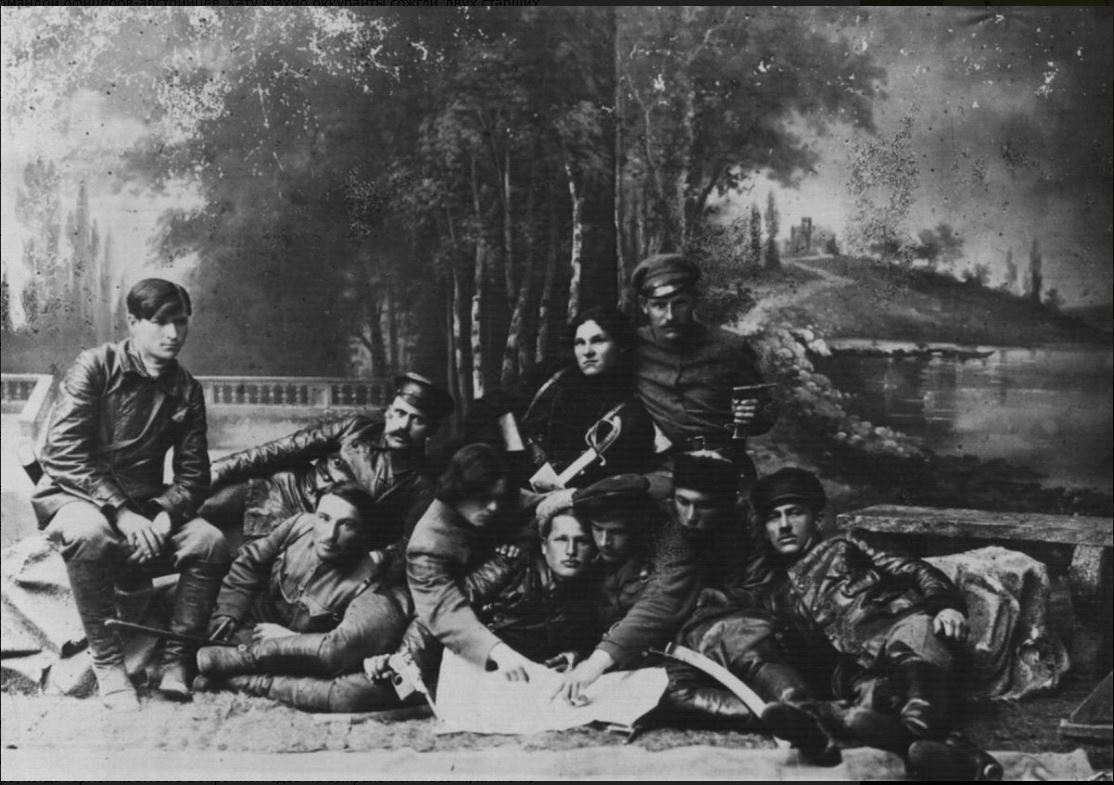
- Nestor Makhno and his lieutenants in Berdiansk (1919)

Overview
- Established: 12 February 1919
- Dissolved: 26 November 1920
- Polity: Makhnovshchina
- Leader: Chairman
- Appointed by: Regional Congress of Peasants, Workers and Insurgents
- Headquarters: Huliaipole

The Military Revolutionary Council (Russian: Военно-революционный Совет, romanized: Voyenno-revolyutsionny Sovet, VRS) was the de facto executive of the Makhnovshchina, empowered to act during the interim between sittings of the Regional Congresses.

== Function ==
Its powers covered both military and civil matters in the region, although it was also subject to instant recall at the will of the Regional Congress and its activities were limited to those explicitly outlined by the Congresses themselves. At each Regional Congress, the VRS was to provide detailed reports of its activities and subjected itself to reorganization. When it came to the decisions of local soviets and assemblies, the VRS presented itself as a solely advisory board, with no power over the local bodies of self-government.

The VRS also functioned as the supreme body of the Revolutionary Insurgent Army, acting in concert with its elected general staff and in consultation with insurgent detachments, thus "representing the authority of the civilian over the military." The VRS even came into conflict with the Makhnovist general staff over a number of unilateral decisions by the latter, including the execution of members of the Polonsky conspiracy. This eventually resulted in an agreement between the two, which reaffirmed the purview of the VRS as being in "administrative, economic, and financial matters", while the insurgent army itself would concentrate on "military affairs."

== History ==
=== First council (February – June 1919) ===
On 12 February 1919, the Second Regional Congress elected the first VRS to act as the interim executive while Congress was not in session. The first VRS consisted of 32 delegates, each representing a district from the provinces of Yekaterinoslav and Taurida. The Second Regional Congress further elected Ivan Chernoknizhny as chairman of the VRS; Leonid Kogan as vice-chairman; and Karbet as secretary.

The constitution of the VRS was opposed by the Bolsheviks, with Lev Kamenev openly demanding its abolition during a visit to Huliaipole. This demand was refused by Nestor Makhno, as the constitution of the VRS outlined that it could only be disbanded by a Regional Congress, not by any central authority.

As tensions between the Insurgents and the Red Army command began to heighten, the VRS convened a Fourth Regional Congress for 15 June. However, this Congress would never take place, as a Red Army attack against Dibrivka on 11 June resulted in the capture and execution of a number of VRS members by the Cheka.

=== Second council (August – October 1919) ===
Moves to reconstitute the VRS were made during negotiations between the Makhnovists and Nykyfor Hryhoriv's green army. In the proposed amalgamated force, Hryhoriv as commander-in-chief of the army would have been subordinate to the VRS, with Nestor Makhno acting as its chairman and Hryhorii Makhno as its chief of staff. However, Hryhoriv would be assassinated by the Makhnovists before the negotiations ended. With the only crucial tactical decisions having been made before its establishment, the second VRS was constituted while on the retreat to Uman and its role was largely confined to propaganda work. One of the appeals that the second VRS issued was a denunciation of the Ukrainian nationalist leader Symon Petliura.

=== Third council (October 1919 – January 1920) ===
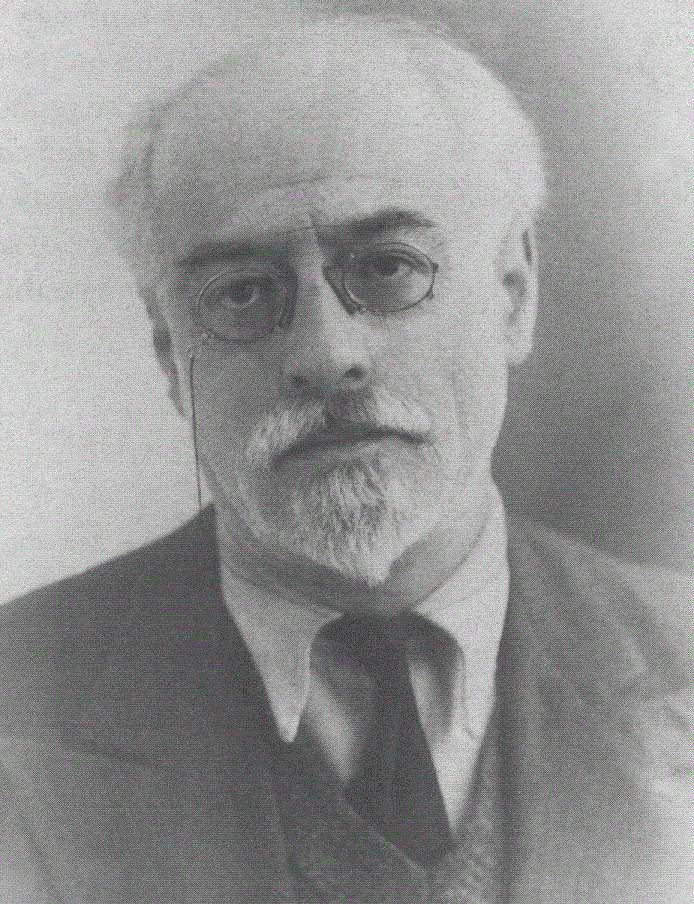
Volin, chairman of the Third Military Revolutionary Council.

On 1 September 1919, the insurgent army called a meeting to restructure the army, in order to rapidly mobilize its forces for partisan warfare against the White movement. A third VRS was elected, consisting of 30 members, with Volin being elected as its chairman, at the insistence of Nestor Makhno.

The third VRS was constituted at a time when the Makhnovshchina's territory had reached its largest extent, while the military and political situation in Ukraine was still fluid. During its time, it implemented a score of economic and social measures. Following the capture of cities and towns, the VRS announced complete freedom of expression and freedom of association would be extended throughout the territory. It subsequently oversaw the seizure of money from local banks and its redistribution to the populace, particularly paying attention to supplying local children's homes and hospitals in Yekaterinoslav. It then appealed to the local populace to summon their own municipal conferences, which would assume control of their local affairs, while the VRS itself stepped back to take on a purely military function. Alexandre Skirda wrote that "[t]his practice on the part of the insurgents is a good illustration of their approach; they took the lead in eliminating state power used by Whites, Reds or any other hegemony-seeking faction, before inviting workers to get on with self-organization."

The third VRS also edited the Makhnovists' official organ The Road to Freedom and published their Draft Declaration of the Revolutionary Insurgent Army of Ukraine, which elaborated on the "free soviets" as the basis of a "transitional period" towards libertarian communism. The VRS envisaged the "free soviets" as laying the groundwork for an eventual "All-Ukrainian Labour Congress", which would result from the self-determination of Ukrainian workers. They contrasted their vision of "social independence" for Ukrainian workers and peasants with the "national independence" sought by the Ukrainian nationalists, declaring that: "Ukrainian, and all other, working people have the right to self-determination not as an 'independent nation', but as 'independent workers'."

=== Final council (June – December 1920) ===
After the fall of Nikopol in January 1920, the Military Revolutionary Council was disbanded and replaced with the Revolutionary Insurgent Council, a new coordinating body concerned entirely with military affairs and drawing largely from an insurgent base. This new VRS consisted of 7 members, elected directly by the insurgents, and was headed by Dmitry Popov as its secretary.

In July and August 1920, the fourth VRS attempted to propose a ceasefire and military alliance with the Red Army, but they received no reply, leaving the Makhnovshchina to effectively fall under the control of the White movement. The VRS again called for a ceasefire on 30 September, this time successfully, resulting in a political and military agreement being made between the Makhnovists and Bolsheviks.

However, the final VRS would end up dissolving by December 1920, when a number of its members, including Popov, were assassinated by the Red Army.

== See also ==
- Ivan Chuchko

== Bibliography ==
- Darch, Colin (2020). Nestor Makhno and Rural Anarchism in Ukraine, 1917–21. London: Pluto Press. ISBN 978-0745338880. OCLC 1225942343.
- Malet, Michael (1982). Nestor Makhno in the Russian Civil War. London: Palgrave Macmillan. ISBN 0-333-25969-6. OCLC 1194667963.
- Shubin, Aleksandr (2010). "The Makhnovist Movement and the National Question in the Ukraine, 1917–1921". In Hirsch, Steven J.; van der Walt, Lucien (eds.). Anarchism and Syndicalism in the Colonial and Postcolonial World, 1870–1940. Studies in Global Social History. Vol. 6. Leiden: Brill. pp. 147–191. ISBN 9789004188495. OCLC 868808983.
- Skirda, Alexandre (2004) [1982]. Nestor Makhno: Anarchy's Cossack. Translated by Sharkey, Paul. Edinburgh: AK Press. ISBN 1-902593-68-5. OCLC 58872511.
