= Regional Congress of Peasants, Workers and Insurgents =

Congress of Makhnovshchina

- Flag of the Huliaipole District Soviet of Peasants', Workers' and Soldiers' Deputies, as described by Viktor Bilash. The flag reads “Власть рождает паразитов. Да здравствует Анархия!” (“Power breeds parasites. Long live anarchy!”)

Type
- Type: Congress of Makhnovshchina

History
- Founded: 23 January 1919
- Disbanded: 26 November 1920

Leadership
- Chairman: Holovko since January 1919
- Nestor Makhno since February 1919
- Volin since October 1919

The Regional Congresses of Peasants, Workers and Insurgents represented the "highest form of democratic authority" within the political system of the Makhnovshchina. They brought together delegates from the region's peasantry, industrial workers and insurgent soldiers, which would discuss the issues at hand and take their decisions back with them to local popular assemblies.

== Background ==
In the wake of the February Revolution, a series of provincial peasant congresses began to be held throughout Ukraine. In May and July 1917, Nestor Makhno was himself a delegate to peasant congresses in Oleksandrivsk, where he became disillusioned with party politics, due to the dominance of the Socialist-Revolutionary Party and a tendency to discussion and debate, without taking action. In August 1917, Makhno attended the First Provincial Congress of Soviets and Peasant Unions, which was being held in Katerynoslav, but encountered similar problems, despite noting the peasantry's general shift towards left-wing politics. On 8 October [O.S. 25 September] 1917, a regional congress was held in Huliaipole to pursue land reform, resulting in the confiscation of all privately held land and its transferral to public ownership. In December 1917, Makhno attended another Provincial Congress of Soviets in Katerynoslav, during which he successfully mediated a dispute between the majority of Ukrainian nationalists and the minority of revolutionary socialists at the Congress.

Following the October Revolution, increasing hostilities between the nationalists and the socialists ignited a civil war in Ukraine. On 22 December 1918, a Provincial Congress of Soviets was due to meet in Kharkiv, but was banned by the Ukrainian nationalist Petro Bolbochan. Other Soviet elections resulted in street fighting between nationalists and socialists. The advancing Ukrainian People's Army eventually pushed Nestor Makhno's insurgents back to the region around Huliaipole, where they regrouped and resolved to organise a pair of congresses. On 3 January 1919, Viktor Bilash convoked an insurgent congress at Polohy, during which forty delegates from the insurgent units resolved to reorganize their detachments and elected an operational command, with Bilash heading it as chief of staff. Meanwhile, the Makhnovists also began to organize another congress, one which would bring together delegates from the region's peasantry, industrial workers and insurgents.

== First Congress (January 1919) ==
With the Makhnovshchina caught between the advancing fronts of the Ukrainian nationalists in the north and the White movement in the south, it was decided to convene a General Congress to discuss and take action on the situation. On 23 January 1919, the First Congress of Peasants, Workers and Insurgents was held at Dibrivka. It brought together 100 delegates, each representing their own districts or insurgent units, most of whom came from the ranks of the Left Socialist-Revolutionaries and the Maximalists. Chaired by the local peasant Holovko, the discussion was solely concerned with strengthening the frontlines against the Ukrainian nationalists and White movement.

As a result, the Congress called up a voluntary mobilization of World War I veterans and appointed a delegation with the task of securing the release of conscripted peasants from service in the Ukrainian People's Army (UPA) and Volunteer Army. The delegation's propaganda efforts led to mass desertions from the UPA, which allowed the insurgents to capture a number of nationalist-held areas, including the cities of Kharkiv, Katerynoslav and Luhansk. Many of these cities were subsequently occupied by the Red Army, which established the Ukrainian Soviet Socialist Republic as the dominant power in the region. Holovko discovered soon after the Congress that Viktor Bilash, without first communicating the decisision the First Regional Congress, had sent Oleksiy Chubenko to form an alliance with the Red Army.

The First Congress concluded by appointing a five-member commission to convene the next Congressional session.

== Second Congress (February 1919) ==
The establishment of the Ukrainian Soviet Socialist Republic brought with it a top-down bureaucracy, sidelining the power of local Soviets and bringing the top-down authoritarian communism of the Bolsheviks into conflict with bottom-up libertarian communism of the Makhnovists Despite the political conflict, the military situation was beginning to improve, which led Holovko to summon a Second Congress.

On 12 February 1919, the Second Regional Congress of Peasants, Workers and Insurgents was held at Huliaipole. It brought together 245 delegates, representing 350 districts between them. With Nestor Makhno elected as the honorary chairman of the Congress, a delegation from the Soviet capital of Kharkiv gave its report on the negotiations with the Ukrainian Soviet government, declaring that the Bolsheviks "had no intention of opening hostilities against the Makhnovist movement." The Congress then debated the issue of "free soviets" and whether or not they were compatible with a one-party state, with representatives from the Nabat and Left Socialist-Revolutionaries condemning Bolshevik moves to monopolize control over the Soviets. The delegate for Novopavlovsk, Ivan Chernoknizhny, gave a speech denouncing the Ukrainian Soviet government and single-party rule:

"The Ukrainian provisional government stood by, first in Moscow and then in Kursk, until the workers and peasants of Ukraine had liberated the territory of enemies. [...] Now that the enemy is beaten [...] some government appears in our midst describing itself as Bolshevik and aiming to impose its party dictatorship upon us. Is that to be countenanced? [...] We are non-party insurgents, and we have revolted against all our oppressors; we will not countenance a new enslavement, no matter the quarter whence it may come!"

The Congress thus passed a resolution, in defiance of the Bolshevik government, which declared its intention to establish a regime of "freely elected, anti-authoritarian soviets". With its stated goal being to "defend land, truth and freedom", the Congress called on "their peasant and worker comrades to undertake by their own efforts to build a new, free society in their locale, without tyrannical decrees and orders, and in defiance of tyrants and oppressors throughout the world: a society without ruling landowners, without subordinate slaves, without rich or poor."

The Second Congress concluded with the election of a Military Revolutionary Council (VRS), which would act as the executive in the interim between Congressional sessions. It also established a supply section to distribute supplies throughout the front and called for a "general voluntary and egalitarian mobilization" of laborers and fighters, to respectively ensure that essential agricultural tasks continued and that a militia force with a centralized command structure was established. On the issue of land reform, the Congress called for the formation of local land committees to redistribute privately held land, along with seeds and other materials, to poor and landless peasants.

The result of the Second Congress was a continuation of the military pact with the Red Army, while maintaining an adversarial stance towards the political policies of the Bolshevik Party. Despite this, the Bolshevik leadership took the military pact as a formal recognition of the Ukrainian Soviet government, which set the groundwork for increased tensions between the two factions. Within days of the Congress ending, the Makhnovist insurgent detachments were inducted into the 1st Zadneprovsk Ukrainian Soviet Division, with Nestor Makhno himself assuming command over the 3rd Brigade.

== Third Congress (April 1919) ==
With the Bolsheviks attempting to further integrate the Makhnovshchina into the Ukrainian Soviet Socialist Republic, the military alliance between the two factions continued to hold, in spite of the political divisions. It was in this context that the Military Revolutionary Council convened the Third Regional Congress of Peasants, Workers and Insurgents, to be held in Huliaipole on 10 April 1919. It brought together delegates from 72 districts, who together represented over 2 million people, to deal with the civil and military issues of the day. One of the resolutions that the Third Congress adopted was the free election of unit commanders within the Insurgent Army, while at the same time recommending that those with military expertise, such as veterans of World War I, be given preference for these positions.

Other resolutions adopted by the Third Congress resulted in the endorsement of a specifically anarchist platform for the Makhnovshchina, rejecting the "dictatorship of the proletariat", denying the legitimacy of the All-Ukrainian Congress of Soviets and calling for the liquidation of all Soviets controlled by the Bolshevik Party. This championing of "anti-state socialism" resulted in a swift reaction by the Bolsheviks, who banned the congress. Near the end of the Congressional session, a telegram arrived from Pavel Dybenko, who pronounced the Congress to be "counter-revolutionary" and declared its organizers to be outlaws, threatening them with "the most rigorous repressive measures." The delegates sent back an indignant response, informing him for what purpose and under what power the Third Congress had been summoned. Assuming Dybenko to be ignorant of the context, the Congress pointed out that it had come about through a process set into motion by the Makhnovshchina, at a time when the Red Army had not yet arrived in Ukraine. The Delegates concluded their message by asking of Dybenko:

"Can there exist laws made by a few people calling themselves revolutionaries, laws that enable them to outlaw en masse people who are more revolutionary than they are themselves?"

The Congress vowed to continue its activities unabated, as it considered itself beholden to "the responsibility which the people had delegated onto its shoulders."

== Planned Fourth Congress (June 1919) ==
With tensions between the Makhnovists and Bolsheviks beginning to reach a head, on 31 May 1919, the Military Revolutionary Council decided to convene an extraordinary Fourth Regional Congress of Peasants, Workers and Insurgents. It was to bring together delegates from 90 districts, across the provinces of Donetsk, Katerynoslav, Kharkiv, Kherson and Taurida. Each congressional delegate was to represent 3,000 workers or peasants, with representatives also being drawn from each insurgent unit of the Red Army and others from the insurgent general staff, while also allowing pro-Soviet political parties to field one delegate for each of their district branches. Their summons declared that "only the working masses themselves can find a solution, and not parties or individuals." The agenda for the Congress was to include:

1. Reports from the executive committee of the Military Revolutionary Council and from delegates from the district executive committees
2. business in hand
3. purpose, meaning and tasks of the Huliaipole regional council
4. reorganization of the regional Military Revolutionary Council
5. organization of military tasks in the region
6. the question of provisions
7. the agrarian issue
8. the financial question
9. the unions of peasant laborers and workers
10. public safety
11. the exercise of justice in the region
12. other business.

The Fourth Regional Congress was to be held in Huliaipole, on 15 June 1919, but it would not end up taking place. The All-Ukrainian Central Executive Committee passed a resolution against the convocation of the Fourth Congress, demanding that the Council of People's Commissars "take ruthless and resolute measures" to prevent the Congress from taking place. The Bolshevik politician Dmitry Lebed even claimed that the convocation of the Fourth Congress was intended to separate the "libertarian republic of Makhnovia" from the Ukrainian Soviet Socialist Republic.

By this time, Leon Trotsky was already levying fierce criticisms against the Makhnovshchina and had declared himself unwilling to accept a Fourth Regional Congress being held. On 4 June, he issued Order No. 1824, in which he claimed the Congress to be "wholly directed against soviet power in Ukraine". He therefore ordered the prohibition of the Congress, deemed participation in it as amounting to high treason, and ordered the arrest and court martial of all congressional delegates. On 6 June, Trotsky specified that the punishment for participation in the banned congress was to be execution by firing squad. Before long, a number of peasants who were caught discussing the Congress had been brought before the 14th Army's revolutionary tribunal and shot. Huliaipole itself faced a series of attacks by the Red Army and White Cossacks, which definitively prevented the Congress from taking place.

Considering the proscription of the Congress to be a "direct and shameless infringement of the workers' rights", Nestor Makhno relinquished his command of the 7th Ukrainian Soviet Division, reaffirming his commitment to the "inalienable right of workers and peasants, a right won by revolution, to themselves organize congresses to discuss and decide upon their private and general affairs." Over the subsequent weeks, even more people were arrested and shot for supporting the Fourth Congress, including members of the Makhnovist general staff and a number of Huliaipole's peasants.

== Fourth Congress (October 1919) ==
Following the insurgent victory over the White movement, the Makhnovshchina experienced a rapid growth. The local populations of the insurgent-occupied territory were invited to elect their own delegates from trade unions and Soviets to a regional congress, which would determine how to solve the issues at hand.

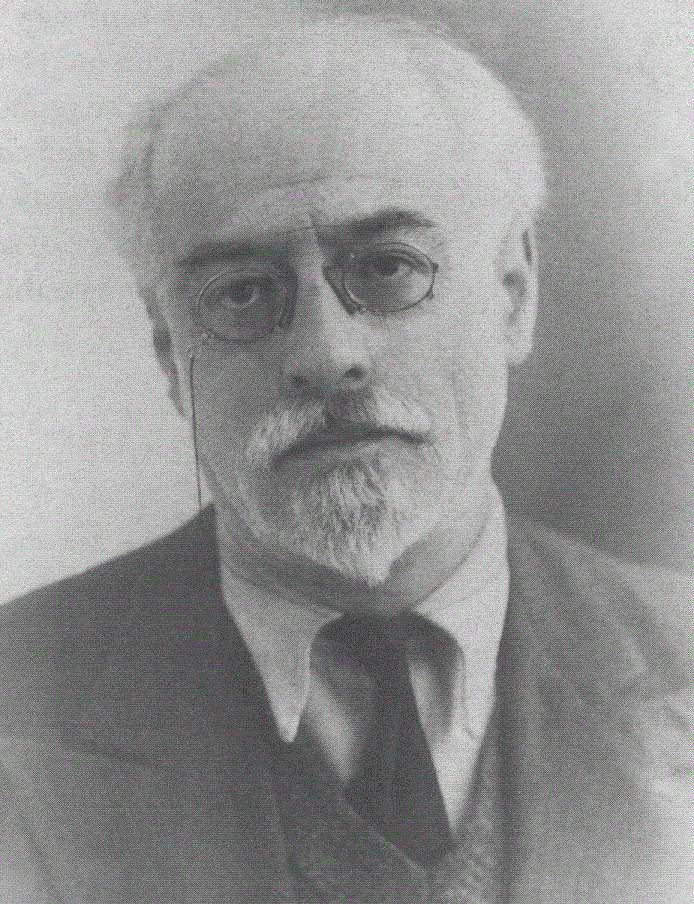
Volin, chairman of the Fourth Regional Congress of Peasants, Workers and Insurgents.

From 27 October to 2 November 1919, a Fourth Regional Congress of Peasants, Workers and Insurgents was held in Oleksandrivsk. It brought together 300 delegates that each represented roughly 3,000 people, including 180 peasant delegates, 20 worker delegates and 100 delegates from insurgents units and the various "left-wing revolutionary organizations", with Volin being elected as the Chairman of the Congress. During the election of delegates, the Makhnovists prohibited official representation for political parties and refused to allow any electoral campaign beforehand, an issue that saw an intervention from members of the Left Socialist-Revolutionaries, who worried that "counter-revolutionaries" would end up being elected. On the Congressional agenda was the:

1. Organization of the insurgent army;
2. Reorganization of supply arrangements;
3. Organization of a commission to convene a subsequent congress and conferences on the questions of social and economic construction;
4. Business in hand.

First of all, the Congress called for a "voluntary" mobilization of young people into the Insurgent Army, where those aged 18–25 would be dispatched to the front and those aged 25–45 would undertake the self-defense of their local districts. Congress then decided that the Insurgent Army's provisions would be drawn from supplies captured in battle, requisitions from the wealthy and voluntary contributions from the peasantry. Congress also set up a "freelance medical service" in order to tend to wounded and sick insurgents and established an enquiry to investigate abuses of power by the Makhnovist security service, which was being accused of arbitrary arrests, executions and torture. After that, Congress appointed a commission for the preparation of further congresses and conferences, in order to reconstruct the region's economy and wider society.

On the final day, the issue of "free soviets" was raised by Volin and Nestor Makhno, with Congress adopting a resolution that called for the immediate construction of "free soviets". This was opposed by delegates from the Mensheviks and Socialist-Revolutionary Party, who supported a Constituent Assembly, to which Makhno responded by denouncing them a "counter-revolutionaries", which led to 11 trade union delegates walking out of the Congress in outrage. The issue of "free soviets" was also opposed by the Bolshevik delegates in attendance, with one taking the opportunity to denounce Anarchy in its entirety. However, the Bolsheviks did not press the issue further and one of their party members was even elected to the Military Revolutionary Council. Makhno was later forced to clarify on his comments about the Menshevik and SR delegates, publishing an open letter in The Road to Freedom, in which he reiterated his opposition to a Constituent Assembly, accusing the delegates in question of working for Anton Denikin.

Other resolutions passed at the Oleksandrivsk Congress included one that prohibited drunkenness amongst the armed insurgents, by penalty of execution by firing squad, and another that levied an expropriation against the local banks and bourgeoisie, resulting in the seizure and redistribution of millions of rubles. Plans were also made to convene a definitive Fourth Regional Congress of Peasants, Workers and Insurgents at Katerynoslav in December 1919, but this was unable to proceed, as the city was attacked by White Cossacks, forcing the insurgents to evacuate the city.

== Further Planned Congresses (1920) ==
With the Whites falling back to Crimea, on 7 January 1920, the Insurgent Army called for an All-Ukrainian Congress of Workers and Peasants to be convoked as soon as possible. The Insurgent Army even offered to lay down their arms, should an All-Ukrainian Congress instruct them to. However, the advance of the Red Army into Ukraine and the resumption of hostilities between the Bolsheviks and Makhnovists meant that such a Congress was unable to proceed. In the face of the Red Army invasion, in March 1920, the Insurgent Army called for peasants to convoke clandestine congresses, at both the district and regional levels, in order to discuss and act on the issues brought on by the renewed conflict.

By October 1920, the Bolsheviks and Makhnovists concluded an alliance that ended hostilities between the two and granted the anarchists some level of autonomy. One of the terms of the Political Pact was that anarchists and Makhnovists would be entitled to freely participation in elections to Soviets and run for election in the upcoming Fifth All-Ukrainian Congress of Soviets. The anarchist author Peter Arshinov would later insist that this term of the pact was only made "as a precaution on the insurgents' part against a surprise attack from the Bolsheviks."

With anarchists once again able to freely organize, an Anarchist General Congress was planned to take place at the end of November 1920 in the Ukrainian Soviet capital of Kharkiv. The Makhnovists also made plans for a Fifth Regional Congress of Peasants, Workers and Insurgents, scheduling it to be held at Oleksandrivsk in November 1920. However, following the conclusion of the Southern Front against the White movement, fighting once again broke out between the Makhnovists and Bolsheviks, causing this Congress to also be aborted. The Fifth All-Ukrainian Congress of Soviets, which anarchists and Makhnovists had been promised they could participate in, ended up ordering a state campaign against "banditry", dedicated to liquidating the Makhnovshchina. After her flight into exile, Halyna Kouzmenko wrote a letter to Kharkiv requesting an end to persecution against the Makhnovists, asking that they be extended the right to participate in congresses and soviets, in exchange for laying down their arms. But this request was rejected by the Ukrainian Soviet government.

Following the conflict, the Congresses became a point of criticism by a number of anarchist authors, with some comparing them to legislatures such as the Russian Constituent Assembly and questioning "if anarchist society has any need of general congresses to pronounce upon anything at all." One anarchist insisted that an anarchist society's constitution should be "set up only through the creative endeavors of the masses, groups and individuals and not through the legislative action of congresses, even should these be 'non-party."

== See also ==
- All-Ukrainian Congress of Soviets
- Central Council of Ukraine
- Military Revolutionary Council

== Bibliography ==
- Darch, Colin (2020). Nestor Makhno and Rural Anarchism in Ukraine, 1917–21. London: Pluto Press. ISBN 978-0745338880. OCLC 1225942343.
- Malet, Michael (1982). Nestor Makhno in the Russian Civil War. London: Palgrave Macmillan. ISBN 0-333-25969-6. OCLC 1194667963.
- Shubin, Aleksandr (2010). "The Makhnovist Movement and the National Question in the Ukraine, 1917–1921". In Hirsch, Steven J.; van der Walt, Lucien (eds.). Anarchism and Syndicalism in the Colonial and Postcolonial World, 1870–1940. Studies in Global Social History. Vol. 6. Leiden: Brill. pp. 147–191. ISBN 9789004188495. OCLC 868808983.
- Skirda, Alexandre (2004) [1982]. Nestor Makhno: Anarchy's Cossack. Translated by Sharkey, Paul. Edinburgh: AK Press. ISBN 1-902593-68-5. OCLC 58872511.
