= Volin =

Russian anarchist and historian of anarchism (1882–1945)

- Волин
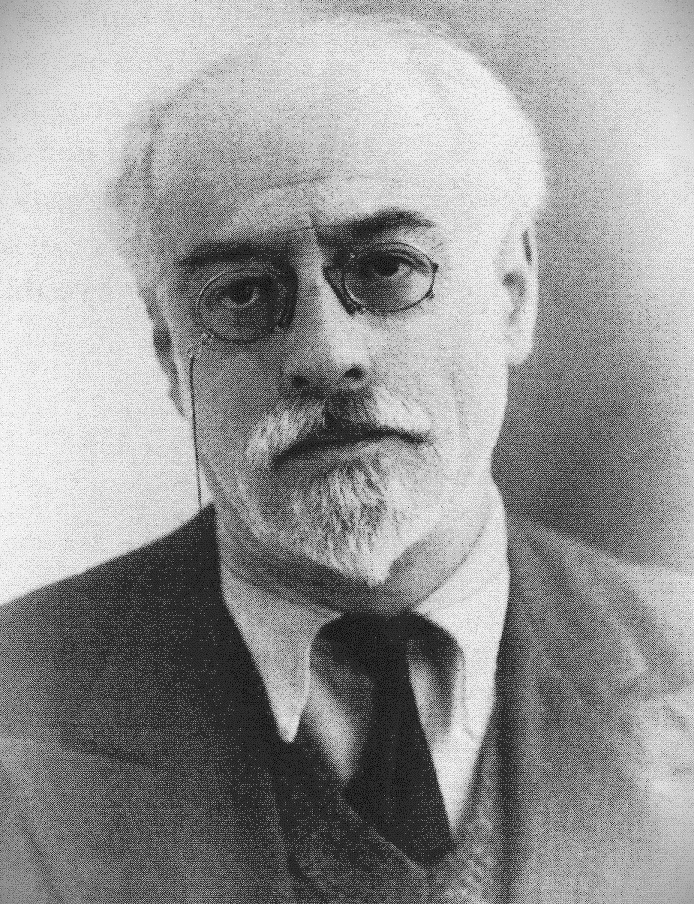
- Portrait photograph of Volin

Chairman of the Military Revolutionary Council of the Makhnovshchina
- In office 1 September 1919 – 31 January 1920
- Preceded by: Nestor Makhno
- Succeeded by: Dmitry Popov

Personal details
- Born: Vsevolod Mikhailovich Eikhenbaum; 23 August [O.S. 11 August] 1882 Voronezh, Russia
- Died: 18 September 1945 (aged 63) Paris, France
- Resting place: Père Lachaise Cemetery
- Party: Socialist Revolutionary (1904–1911)
- Other political affiliations: Union of Russian Workers (1916–1918); Nabat (1918–1920)
- Relatives: Jacob Eichenbaum (grandfather); Boris Eikhenbaum (brother)
- Education: Saint Petersburg State University
- Occupation: Politician; writer

Vsevolod Mikhailovich Eikhenbaum (Note: Russian: Всеволод Михайлович Эйхенбаум, romanized: Vsevolod Mikhaylovich Eykhenbaum; Yiddish: ווסעוואָלאָד מיכאילאָוויטש אייכענבוים, romanized: Vsevolod Mikhailovitsh Aykhenbaum) (23 August [O.S. 11 August] 1882 – 18 September 1945), commonly known by his pseudonym Volin, (Note: French: Voline; Russian: Волин; Yiddish: וואָלין) was a Russian anarchist intellectual. He became involved in revolutionary socialist politics during the 1905 Russian Revolution, for which he was forced into exile, where he gravitated towards anarcho-syndicalism.

He returned to Petrograd following the February Revolution of 1917 and propagandised for anarcho-syndicalism in the Russian capital. In the wake of the October Revolution, which he criticised for bringing the Bolsheviks to power, he left for Ukraine, where he became a leading figure in the Makhnovshchina. During this time, he developed a theory of anarchist synthesis, which advocated for collaboration between anarchists of different tendencies, and spearheaded the intellectual development of Ukrainian anarchism, as leader of the Nabat and chair of the third Military Revolutionary Council during the civil war.

After the suppression of the Russian and Ukrainian anarchist movements by the Bolsheviks, Volin again went into exile. In Paris, he became a leading opponent of platformism, which he criticised as authoritarian, and found work as a prolific writer in multiple different languages. He lived out the last years of his life in poverty, evading persecution by the Nazis and the French State, as he was wanted for his Jewish heritage and his anarchist political convictions. He died of tuberculosis shortly after the liberation of France.

== Early life ==
Volin was born Vsevolod Mikhailovich Eikhenbaum on 23 August [O.S. 11 August] 1882, to an educated Russian Jewish family from Voronezh, a city in the Central Black Earth Region of the Russian Empire. His parents, both of whom were doctors, employed western tutors for Volin and his brother, Boris, who were educated in the French and German languages, in addition to Russian. After completing his education in Voronezh, Volin moved to Saint Petersburg, where he studied in the Faculty of Law at Saint Petersburg State University.

== Political activism ==
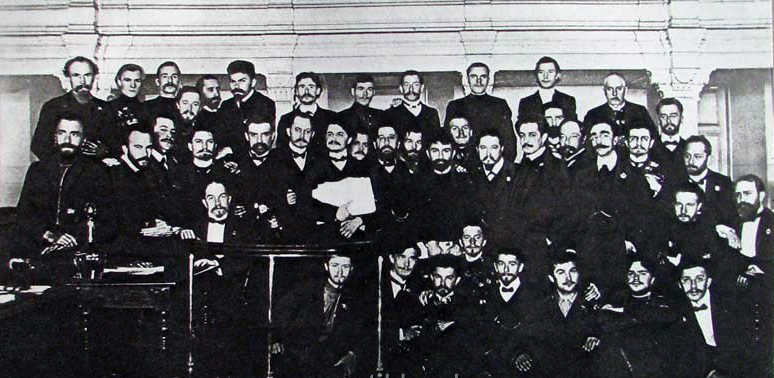
Members of the Saint Petersburg Soviet, which Volin helped establish during the 1905 Russian Revolution

By 1901, Volin had become involved in the imperial capital's nascent workers' movement, and in 1904, he dropped out of university to be a full-time activist for the Socialist Revolutionary Party. He mostly worked to educate workers as a tutor, also establishing a library and organising study groups. As a socialist revolutionary, he was involved in the 1905 Russian Revolution from its inception: witnessing the events of Bloody Sunday; participating in the establishment of the Saint Petersburg Soviet; before he was arrested for his part in an uprising at Kronstadt, for which he was briefly imprisoned in the Peter and Paul Fortress. Following the suppression of the revolution, in 1907, he was arrested again by the Okhrana and deported to Siberia, but was able to escape into exile in France.

After settling in Paris, Volin met a number of anarchists, including the French Sébastien Faure and the Russian Apollon Karelin. By 1911, he had committed himself to anarchism, leaving the Socialist Revolutionary Party and joining Karelin's Brotherhood of Free Communists. With the outbreak of World War I, Volin immediately joined the anti-war movement, catching the attention of the French authorities. He managed to evade capture and fled to the United States in 1915. Upon arriving in New York City, he joined the Union of Russian Workers, a Russian American anarcho-syndicalist organisation. He soon joined the editorial staff of its newspaper, Golos truda, and in December 1916, he went on a speaking tour of North American cities. In the wake of the February Revolution, Volin returned to Russia. In July 1917, he and his colleagues from Golos truda arrived in Petrograd, where they restarted publication of their newspaper, now propagating anarcho-syndicalism directly to the workers of the Russian capital.

== Revolutionary activities ==
Volin quickly became a leading proponent of anarcho-syndicalism during the 1917 Revolution, calling for workers' control in his frequent speeches to the workers of Petrograd and as editor of Golos truda, which expanded its circulation to 25,000 readers. In the wake of the October Revolution, he became a vocal critic of the Bolsheviks, warning of their authoritarian tendencies and predicting that they would see the power of the soviets usurped by the state. He particularly criticised the Treaty of Brest-Litovsk, which he considered to be a renouncement of world revolution by the Bolsheviks. He called for the prosecution of partisan warfare against the Central Powers and consequently decided to move to Ukraine, which had fallen under the occupation of the German Empire and Austria-Hungary.

After visiting relatives in Voronezh and spending a few months organising educational institutions for the local soviet in Bobrov, Volin moved to Kharkov, where he participated in the establishment of the Nabat Confederation of Anarchist Organisations. On 18 November 1918, at the organisation's first conference in Kursk, he drew up a declaration of principles, which was designed to be acceptable to the three major anarchist schools of thought: communism, individualism and syndicalism. Volin's theory of anarchist synthesis, which encouraged anarchists of different tendencies to cooperate, was criticised as ineffective by his former anarcho-syndicalist comrades such as Grigorii Maksimov and Mark Mratchny. Nevertheless, Volin continued to advocate for his organisational theory through the Nabat, which grew to include autonomous branches throughout Ukraine, as well as a youth section and a publishing house.

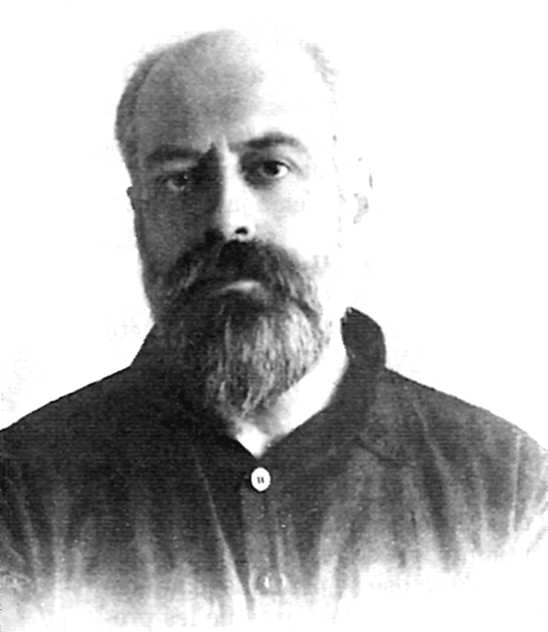
Volin in 1919, during his time with the Nabat and the Makhnovshchina

By mid-1919, the organisation had drawn the attention of the Bolsheviks, who closed its meeting places and shut down its newspaper press. In response, Volin moved the Nabat's headquarters to Huliaipole, where it became a central organisation within the Makhnovshchina, an anarchist mass movement led by Nestor Makhno's Revolutionary Insurgent Army of Ukraine. Volin joined the movement's Cultural-Educational Commission, serving as an editor for its publications and organising its regional congresses, even going on to act as chairman of the Military Revolutionary Council (RVS), the movement's executive body. As chair of the RVS, Volin clashed with the Insurgent Army's command over the excessive violence employed by the Kontrrazvedka. He also edited the movement's Draft Declaration, which proposed the establishment of free soviets as the basis for a transition towards a communist society.

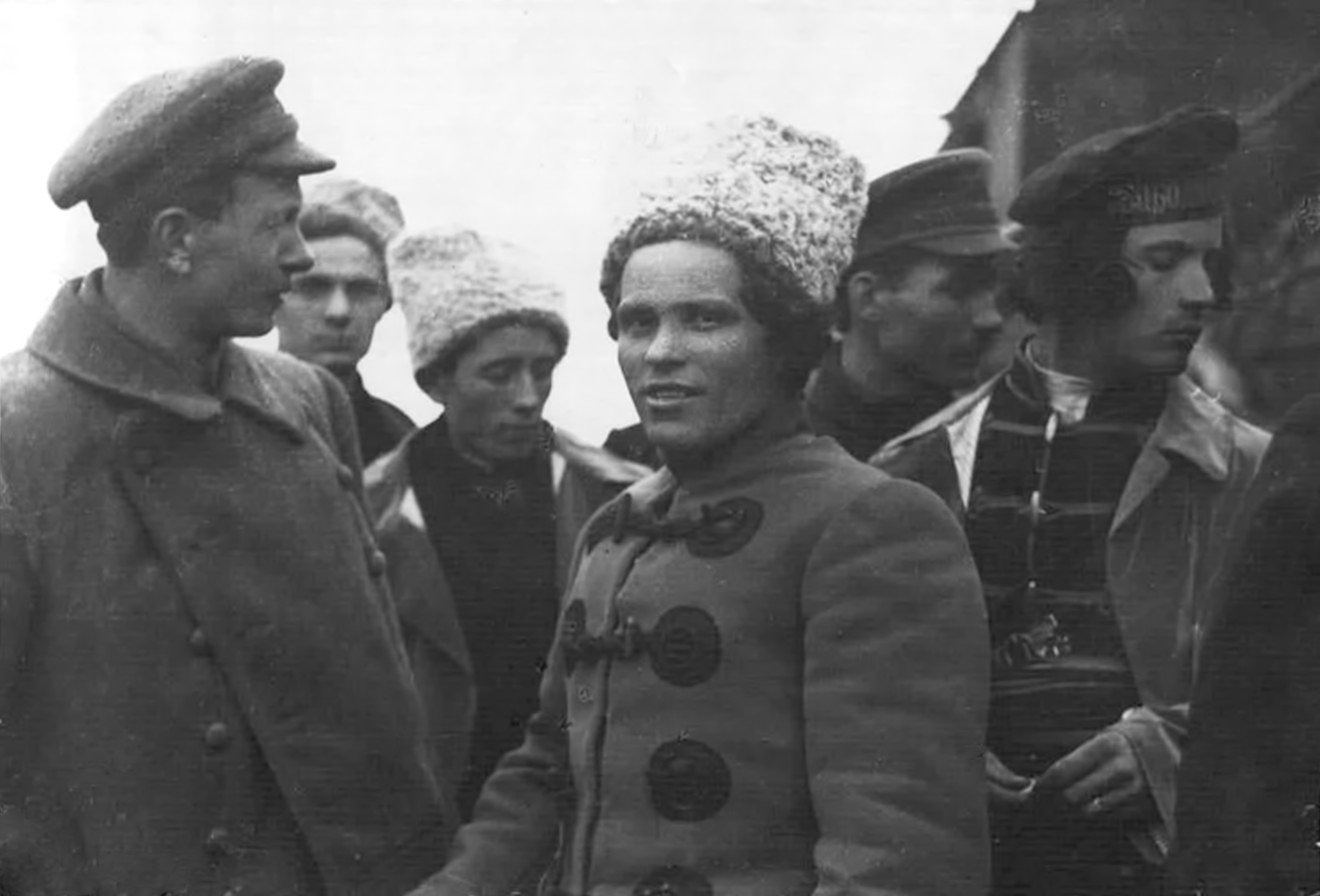
Nestor Makhno (center) and other commanders of the Revolutionary Insurgent Army of Ukraine

In December 1919, Volin went to Krivoy Rog in order to counter the spread of Ukrainian nationalism in the region, but he contracted typhus and was forced to stop for recovery in a peasant village. On 14 January 1920, he was arrested on his sickbed by the 14th Army and given to the Cheka, who had orders from Leon Trotsky to execute him. Russian American anarchists such as Alexander Berkman attempted to appeal his sentence, but this was rejected by Nikolay Krestinsky, the general secretary of the Communist Party and a former colleague of Volin. Further appeals by Russian libertarians, including the Bolshevik Victor Serge, eventually secured his transfer to Butyrka prison in Moscow, where his death sentence was commuted. He was finally released in October 1920, as part of the terms of the Starobilsk agreement between the Bolsheviks and the Makhnovists, and he was even offered the post of People's Commissar for Education in the Ukrainian Soviet government, which he rejected.

In November, Volin made a quick visit to Dmitrov, where he paid his respects to a dying Peter Kropotkin, who by then was pessimistic about the prospects of the revolution. He then returned to Kharkov, where he began to prepare an All-Russian Congress of Anarchists to be held on 25 December, as well as leading the negotiations with Christian Rakovsky's government over the controversial fourth political clause of the Starobilsk agreement, which would have provided for the autonomy of the Makhnovshchina.

Following the soviet victory over the White movement in Crimea, Volin and other members of the Nabat were arrested and imprisoned again in Moscow. In July 1921, after being visited by Gaston Leval, a French syndicalist delegate to the Profintern, Volin and other anarchist political prisoners staged a hunger strike in order to draw the attention of other visiting trade union delegates. Following protests from the delegates to Vladimir Lenin, the prisoners were released and subsequently deported from Soviet Russia in January 1922.

== Exile ==
Exiled in Berlin, Volin and his family were supported by German anarchists such as Rudolf Rocker, who provided them with a small attic to live in. While in the German capital, Volin worked with Alexander Berkman to provide support for anarchist political prisoners and exiles, including Nestor Makhno himself, who Volin helped escape from Poland to Berlin. He also published a weekly newspaper, The Anarchist Herald, translated Peter Arshinov's History of the Makhnovist Movement and publicised evidence of political repressions against Russian anarchists.

In 1924, his old comrade Sébastien Faure invited him back to Paris to collaborate on the publication of his Anarchist Encyclopedia. Volin became a key contributor to the encyclopedia, as well as a number of anarchist periodicals in various different languages, including the French Le Libertaire, the German Die Internationale, the English Man!, the Russian Delo truda and the Yiddish Fraye Arbeter Shtime. It was at this time that he also began to compile his history of the Russian Revolution.

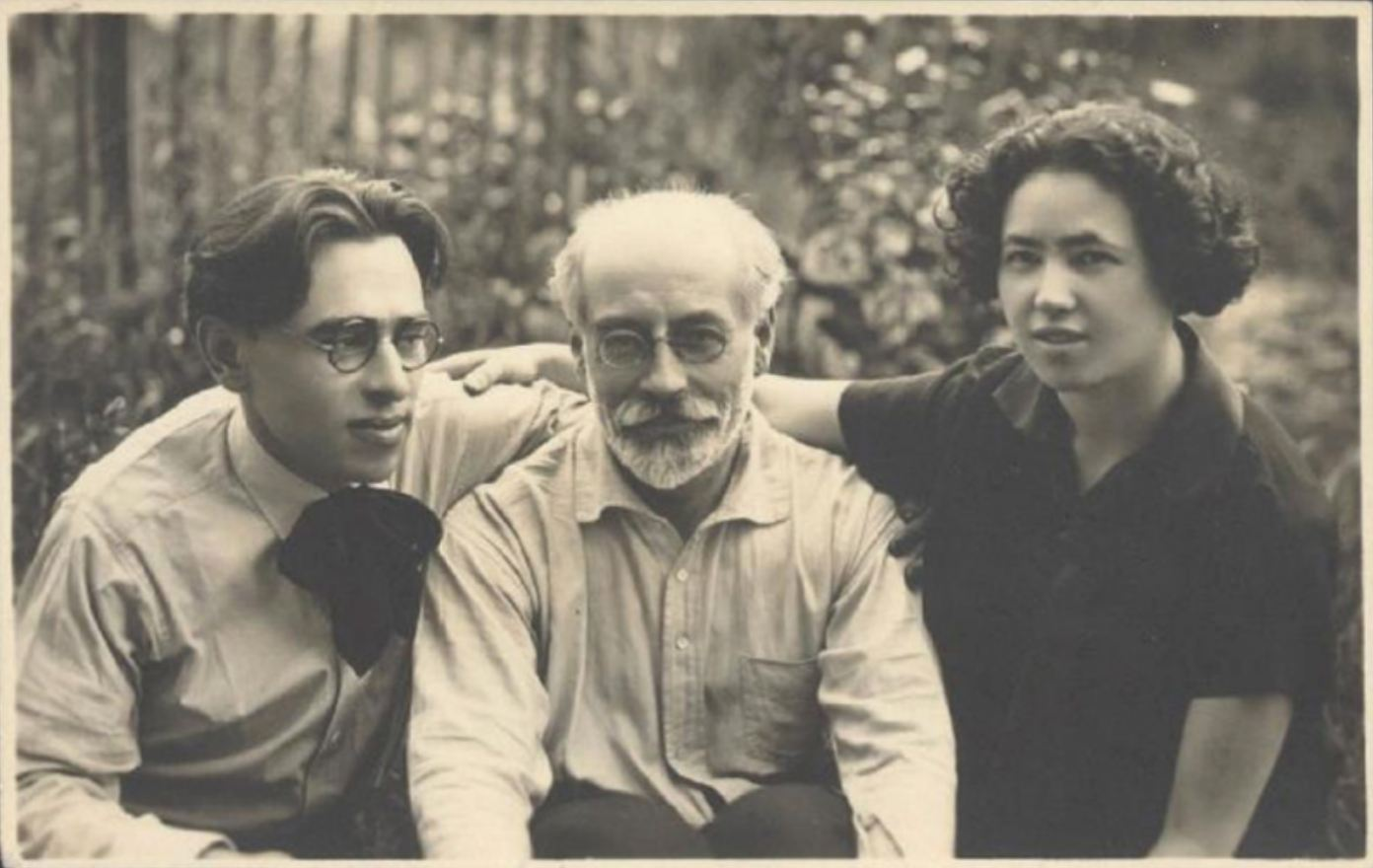
Volin (center) with his friends Senya Fleshin and Mollie Steimer

In 1927, Volin was caught in the debate over the Platform, which had caused a split in the exiled Russian anarchist movement. Volin himself was extremely critical of the Platform, which he claimed contradicted the anarchist principle of decentralisation and reflected a desire to create an anarchist political party. This split led to a particularly harsh falling-out with Nestor Makhno, who resented Volin's intellectualism. Despite this, the pair managed to reconcile before Makhno's death in 1934, at the behest of Makhno's wife Halyna Kuzmenko, and Volin took up the task of editing and publishing Makhno's memoirs.

Along with his criticisms of platformism, Volin also published denunciations of Bolshevism, which he described as "red fascism", comparing the policies of Joseph Stalin to those of Benito Mussolini and Adolf Hitler. He criticised the "anarcho-Bolsheviks", who had favoured collaboration with the Bolshevik government, and was openly critical of the "anarcho-Bolshevik" German Sandomirskii, who he accused of lacking anarchist convictions.

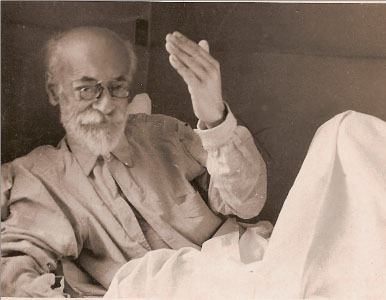
Volin during the last years of his life

He attempted to continue his educational activities by providing free classes about anarchism, but he also needed money to support his family, so he took up a number of jobs in the publishing industry, notably working on a Russian translation of Eugene O'Neill's play Lazarus Laughed. In the wake of the Spanish Revolution of 1936, he briefly worked on the French language organ of the Confederación Nacional del Trabajo, but quit after the organisation joined the government of the Popular Front. Volin lived out the following years in poverty, until André Prudhommeaux provided him a job on the board of his newspaper Terre Libre, which he contributed to in Nîmes.

In 1940, while living in poverty in Marseille, he completed his work on The Unknown Revolution, a history of the Russian Revolution. Following the invasion of France by Nazi Germany and the establishment of the collaborationist French State, he was driven into hiding due to his Jewish heritage and his anarchist political beliefs. Although his friends Senya Fleshin and Mollie Steimer attempted to convince him to escape to Mexico with them, he resolved to remain in France, as he believed that there would be a revolution following the end of the war.

However, by the time the liberation of France allowed him to return to Paris, he had contracted tuberculosis. On 18 September 1945, Volin died in a Parisian hospital. His ashes were buried in a niche of the Père Lachaise Cemetery, near the resting place of his comrade Nestor Makhno.

In his obituary to Volin written the month after his death, Victor Serge described him as "one of the most remarkable figures of Russian anarchism, a man of absolute probity and exceptional rigor of thought. ... One must hope that the future will render justice to this intrepidly idealistic revolutionary who was always, in prison, in the poverty of exile, as on the battlefield and in editorial offices, a man of real moral grandeur."

== Works ==
- Volin (1922). "Гонения на анархизм в Советской России" [The Repressions of the Anarchists in Soviet Russia]. The Anarchist Herald (in Russian).
- —— (1924). "Sur la Synthèse" [On Synthesis]. Revue anarchiste (in French). No. 25–27.
- —— (1934). "Le Fascisme Rouge" [Red Fascism]. Ce qu'il faut dire (in French).
- —— (1935). "The Historical Role of the State". Vanguard. Vol. 2, no. 3. pp. 8–11.
- —— (1947). La Révolution Inconnue [The Unknown Revolution] (in French). Les Amis de Voline.

== See also ==
- Bibliography of the Russian Revolution and Civil War
- Outline of the Russian Revolution and Civil War
- Index of articles related to the Russian Revolution and Civil War
- Paul Avrich – American historian of anarchism (1931–2006)
- Max Nettlau – German anarchist and historian
- Alexandre Skirda – French anarchist historian and translator (1942–2020)

== Bibliography ==
- Avrich, Paul (1988). "V. M. Eikhenbaum (Volin): The Man and His Book". Anarchist Portraits. Princeton University Press. pp. 125–134. ISBN 978-0-691-04753-9. OCLC 17727270 – via Internet Archive.
- Darch, Colin (2020). Nestor Makhno and Rural Anarchism in Ukraine, 1917–1921. London: Pluto Press. doi:10.2307/j.ctv16zjhb1. ISBN 9781786805263. OCLC 1225942343. S2CID 224949062.
- Guérin, Daniel (2005) [1998]. "Voline". No Gods, No Masters: An Anthology of Anarchism. Translated by Sharkey, Paul. Edinburgh: AK Press. pp. 473–475. ISBN 1-904859-25-9. LCCN 2005930956.
- Malet, Michael (1982). Nestor Makhno in the Russian Civil War. London: Palgrave Macmillan. ISBN 978-0-333-25969-6. OCLC 8514426.
- Marshall, Peter H. (2008) [1992]. "Russia and Ukraine". Demanding the Impossible: A History of Anarchism. London: Harper Perennial. pp. 469–478. ISBN 978-0-00-686245-1. OCLC 218212571.
- Patterson, Sean (2020). Makhno and Memory: Anarchist and Mennonite Narratives of Ukraine's Civil War, 1917–1921. Manitoba: University of Manitoba Press. ISBN 978-0-88755-578-7. OCLC 1134608930.
- Peters, Victor (1970). Nestor Makhno: The Life of an Anarchist. Winnipeg: Echo Books. OCLC 7925080.
- Rocker, Rudolf (2019) [1974]. "Voline (1882–1945)". In Volin (ed.). The Unknown Revolution, 1917–1921. PM Press. ISBN 978-16296-3577-4. OCLC 1103577845.
- Shubin, Aleksandr (2010). "The Makhnovist Movement and the National Question in the Ukraine, 1917–1921". In Hirsch, Steven J.; van der Walt, Lucien (eds.). Anarchism and Syndicalism in the Colonial and Postcolonial World, 1870–1940. Studies in Global Social History. Vol. 6. Leiden: Brill. pp. 147–191. ISBN 9789004188495. OCLC 868808983.
- Skirda, Alexandre (2002). Facing the Enemy: A History of Anarchist Organisation. Translated by Sharkey, Paul. Oakland: AK Press. ISBN 1902593197. OCLC 490977034.
- Skirda, Alexandre (2004) [1982]. Nestor Makhno–Anarchy's Cossack: The Struggle for Free Soviets in the Ukraine 1917–1921. Translated by Sharkey, Paul. Oakland: AK Press. ISBN 978-1-902593-68-5. OCLC 60602979.
- van der Walt, Lucien; Schmidt, Michael (2009). Black Flame: The Revolutionary Class Politics of Anarchism and Syndicalism. Edinburgh: AK Press. pp. 239–270. ISBN 978-1-904859-16-1. LCCN 2006933558. OCLC 1100238201.
