= Draft Declaration of the Revolutionary Insurgent Army of Ukraine =

- Original title: Проект Декларації Революційної Повстанської Армії України
- Created: August 1919
- Ratified: 20 October 1919
- Date effective: November 1919 (de facto)
- Repealed: August 1921 (de facto)
- Commissioned by: Revolutionary Insurgent Army of Ukraine
- Author(s): Nestor Makhno and Volin
- Signatories: Military Revolutionary Council
- Media type: Manifesto
- Subject: Libertarian communism
- Purpose: Declaration of a "Third Revolution" in southern Ukraine

The Draft Declaration (Ukrainian: Проект Декларації Революційної Повстанської Армії України, romanized: Proekt Deklaratsii Revoliutsionnoi Povstancheskoi Armii Ukrainy (Note: Also translated as the Project-Declaration.)) was a theoretical document, drafted by the Revolutionary Insurgent Army of Ukraine, which outlined the Makhnovshchina's program of free soviets as a foundation for its transition towards a stateless society of libertarian communism.

== History ==
Initially written by Nestor Makhno and other libertarian communists from Huliaipole, in August 1919, the Russian intellectual Volin was commissioned as editor and spent the following month polishing its writing style. Volin didn't insert any of his own work into the Draft, as he considered it to be an accurate expression of the Makhnovshchina's political philosophy, which led Makhno to conclude that it had contained nothing that contradicted anarchism. The Draft Declaration had in fact drawn particularly heavily from the ideas of Mikhail Bakunin, which envisioned a transition towards anarchy through the direct elimination of the state and social inequality.

It was planned for the Draft Declaration to be debated for adoption by a Regional Congress of Peasants, Workers and Insurgents, but this was prevented by the conditions of the ongoing war. Nevertheless, on 20 October, it was adopted by the Military Revolutionary Council and published as a pamphlet for distribution from Oleksandrivsk, with thousands of copies eventually being circulated throughout Ukraine. In November, Makhno elaborated on its theses at the Oleksandrivsk Congress, where it was criticised by participating delegates from the Mensheviks and the Socialist Revolutionary Party, who supported the reconstitution of the Constituent Assembly.

The Draft Declaration itself was preserved in the Bulgarian language by a 1921 edition published in Sofia and later archived by the International Institute of Social History in Amsterdam. Following the defeat of the Makhnovshchina in August 1921, the exiled Nestor Makhno and Peter Arshinov expanded upon the foundations laid by the Draft Declaration, eventually devising the organizational theory of platformism, which they hoped would help put an end to the "theoretical confusion" and "chronic disorganization" of the anarchist movement. This became a source of criticism by the wider anarchist movement: for his shift to platformism, Makhno was accused of "Bonapartism", while the Draft Declaration itself was accused of amounting to a constitution for a decentralized "Makhnovist state", although these charges were denied by Makhno himself.

== Contents ==
=== Introduction ===
The Draft Declaration starts with a brief survey of the history of the Russian Revolution, recounting the "First Revolution" that overthrew the Tsarist autocracy and established a government of the bourgeoisie, followed by the "Second Revolution" that put the Bolsheviks into power. It then charged the new Bolshevik government with hindering the social revolution, claiming that the Party's control over the economy and society had put the Bolsheviks in a privileged position, causing widespread discontent and even uprisings.

It then covered how Ukraine had fallen under the successive rule of the Hetmanate and the Directorate, the excesses of which it claimed had cultivated a sentiment of anti-authoritarianism within Ukrainians, leading to the rise of the Revolutionary Insurgent Army. The Draft Declaration goes on to characterize the subsequent period of self-organization in southern Ukraine as a "Third Revolution", one that stood against all state power. But this "Third Revolution" found itself caught between the Soviet invasion, the White movement and the resurgent People's Republic, weakening the insurgent movement and forcing it to retreat from its home turf, before reopening an all-out offensive against the Whites.

It was in this context that the Draft Declaration concluded: no political party or state system was capable of reorganizing Ukraine's economy according to the needs of the working class. It thus declared the reignition of the "Third Revolution", with the intention of eliminating the concentration of political and economic power. It went on to declare that the intention of the Revolutionary Insurgent Army was to "serve and protect" the social revolution, which it believed would naturally gravitate towards communism through workers' self-management, without the need for any leadership to impose those ideals. It finally characterized the remainder of the Declaration to be advisory and insisted that people themselves decide whether or not to implement its suggestions.

=== Political policy ===
The Draft Declaration called for the establishment of a network of workers' councils and popular assemblies, which would then federate together into a system of "free soviets", in order to organize the economy and society at a large scale. It insisted that this be arranged according to the will of the workers themselves, without the direction of a political party, state authority or upper class, so that social equality could rapidly be achieved and any social stratification would be proved unnecessary.

On the issue of justice, the Draft Declaration rejected all police, judiciaries and legal codes, calling for their abolition and replacement with a form of workers' justice, one based on voluntary self-organization without formalized or specialized power structures.

=== Economic policy ===
The Draft Declaration then turned to an issue with a matter of urgency: the need for an organized supply chain. After blaming the lack of supplies on the ongoing power struggle between various parties, it declared again that the issue would be resolved through workers' self-management and the unification of the proletariat with the peasantry, which could together restart production and introduce a new system of resource distribution.

On the issue of agrarian reform, the Draft Declaration called for the voluntary reconstruction of the agricultural economy by the peasantry, while suggesting that this take the form of communism. It criticised the nationalization of land by the Bolshevik government as a form of state capitalism and called instead for land to be equally redistributed directly to the people that worked it, according to the will of the peasants themselves. It also drew attention to the artels, which it considered to be the best step towards reconstructing agrarian society along cooperative lines. It then concluded by calling for the eradication of "wage slavery" and the establishment of barter between industrial centers and agricultural collectives, declaring mutual aid to be the best solution to the agrarian problem.

Again criticizing the Bolsheviks' nationalization policy, the Draft Declaration called for the means of production to be immediately transferred to workers' control, which it believed would revitalize the industrial economy and end the rising inflation. It declared that only workers' self-management could meet this target and suggested the convocation of workers' congresses to address the issues at hand, including that of affordable housing for all workers.

While the Draft Declaration insisted on the replacement of finance capitalism with communism, it recognized that a monetary system would temporarily need to be maintained in an adapted form, in which compulsory taxation would be abolished and replaced with voluntary contributions. It also advocated for the replacement of state treasuries with a decentralized system of cooperative banking, which would function in the transition towards a non-monetary economy, funding necessary expenses outlined by the Regional Congresses.

=== Social policy ===
The Draft Declaration proclaimed the right of different nationalities to use their own language, live by their own customs and maintain their culture, whilst also denouncing separatism from the perspective of proletarian internationalism, instead considering the union of different nationalities under socialism to be the best path to satisfying national aspirations. It then spoke of Ukrainian independence in terms of the self-determination of Ukrainian workers, aspiring to Ukraine's independence from all political power, including that of a native Ukrainian nation state.

It also declared the need for cultural and educational institutions to be outside of state control, instead proposing they be established as voluntary associations. And it proclaimed the guarantee of civil liberties such as freedom of speech, the press, thought, religion, assembly and association.

The Draft Declaration affirmed the need for armed self-defense in the form of a "free contingent", in which all commanding officers were subject to election and which itself was subordinate to the will of the local populace. It then called for the Regional Congresses to appoint a foreign relations commission, which would publicly and transparently carry out the region's foreign policy, without any secret diplomacy.

=== Conclusion ===
The Draft Declaration concludes by reaffirming its own advisory nature, desiring an open debate and freedom to experiment in the establishment of socialism, which it pledged to "defend with all our might". It once again affirmed the necessity of workers' self-management in the formation of a new society, and ended with a declaration that "by defending this entitlement to creative freedom with armed force [...] we shall win."

== Bibliography ==
- Darch, Colin (2020). Nestor Makhno and Rural Anarchism in Ukraine, 1917–21. London: Pluto Press. ISBN 978-0745338880. OCLC 1225942343.
- Malet, Michael (1982). Nestor Makhno in the Russian Civil War. London: Palgrave Macmillan. ISBN 0-333-25969-6. OCLC 1194667963.
- Skirda, Alexandre (2004) [1982]. Nestor Makhno: Anarchy's Cossack. Translated by Sharkey, Paul. Edinburgh: AK Press. ISBN 1-902593-68-5. OCLC 58872511.
