= Fifth All-Ukrainian Congress of Soviets =

1921 congress

Fifth All-Ukrainian Congress of Soviets (Ukrainian: П'ятий Всеукраїнський з'їзд Рад) was a congress of Soviets (councils) of workers, peasants, Red-army-men deputies that took place in Kharkiv on February 25 - March 3, 1921.

== Composition ==
There were 1,050 delegates out which 841 had a ruling vote. They included 851 communists.

== Agenda ==
- General report of government of the Ukrainian SSR
- About economic development
- About electrification of Ukraine
- About organization of labor
- About reconstruction of transport
- Food issues
- Land issues
- About organization of public education
- About Soviet construction
- About ratification of the Union Treaty between the RSFSR and the UkrSSR

== Decisions ==
On all issues were adopted respective decisions. Among the most important were defined reconstruction of coal and metallurgical industries, drawn specific measures for the electrification of the Republic, regulated the use of land and others. Special attention the congress turned towards on the necessity of broad involvement of workers participation in the congress sessions.

The congress unanimously ratified the union treaty with Russian.

The congress established the Order of the Red Banner of Labor of the Ukrainian SSR.

The congress elected 155 members to the Central Executive Committee and 55 candidates.
