= Nabat =

Nabat Confederation of Anarchist Organizations of Ukraine Набат конфедерація анархістських організацій України
- Leader: Peter Arshinov; Aron Baron; Vsevolod Volin
- Governing body: Secretariat
- Founded: 16 November 1918
- Dissolved: 26 November 1920
- Headquarters: Kharkiv
- Newspaper: Nabat
- Ideology: United anarchism: Communism; Individualism; Syndicalism
- Political position: Far-left
- Movement: Makhnovshchina

The Nabat Confederation of Anarchist Organizations of Ukraine (Ukrainian: Набат конфедерація анархістських організацій України), better known simply as the Nabat (Ukrainian: Набат; English: Alarm), was a Ukrainian anarchist organization that came to prominence during the Ukrainian War of Independence. The organization, based in Kharkiv, had branches in all of Ukraine's major cities. Its constitution was designed to be appealing to each of the different anarchist schools of thought.

The Nabat worked closely with the Makhnovist movement, often taking leading roles within the movement's institutions. But conflicts between the political leadership of the Nabat and the military leadership of the Revolutionary Insurgent Army led to a rupture between the two, before they were both suppressed by the Bolsheviks in November 1920.

In exile, former members of the Nabat became involved in providing prisoner support for their members still in Soviet prisons. They were also embroiled in debates over what to learn from their experiences, with one faction led by Peter Arshinov advocating for platformism, and the other led by Volin advocating for anarchist synthesis.

== History ==
=== Background ===
Following the outbreak of the February Revolution, a number of Russian and Ukrainian anarchists returned from exile to the country. The anarcho-syndicalist Volin arrived in Petrograd and began lecturing about the need for anarchist unity against the rise of Bolshevism. Aron Baron, along with his wife Fanya, moved to Kyiv, where they participated in the local Soviet. Following the Bolshevik occupation of Kharkiv during the October Revolution, Fanya and Aron moved to the city, where they helped to launch the Ukrainian anarchist movement. Meanwhile, Peter Arshinov had been released from Butyrka prison and moved to Katerynoslav, joining the anarchist movement in Donbas and giving lectures to the region's miners and factory workers.

=== Foundation ===
As the new Russian government became increasingly hostile, many anarchists decided to leave Russia and move to Ukraine, where they could enjoy greater freedom and put their ideas into practice. By the fall of 1918 the Nabat Confederation of Anarchist Organizations had established its headquarters in Kharkiv, Ukraine. It soon brought together anarchist groups in cities throughout Ukraine, who aimed to propagate anarchist ideas among Ukrainian workers and peasants through print publications and speaking tours. These local groups were organised through collective decision-making and federated together on a municipal and regional basis, with elected delegates coordinating between them. Over the subsequent months, the Nabat grew to include branches in Katerynoslav and Odesa, Yelyzavethrad, and Kyiv.

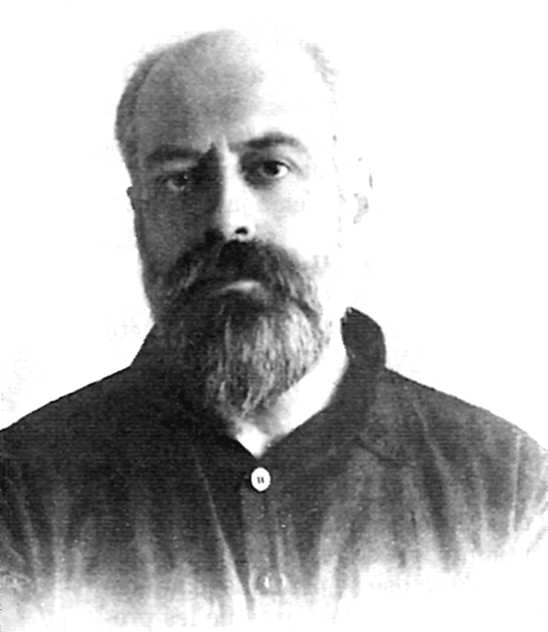
Volin, one of the leading figures of the Nabat and the writer of its platform on "united anarchism".

On 12–16 November 1918, the Nabat held its founding conference in Kursk. The conference resolved to create an all-Ukrainian federation of anarchist groups, united together under a unified platform to take advantage of the opportunities for societal reform offered by the ongoing Russian Civil War. At the conference, Volin was tasked with creating a "declaration of principles" that would be agreeable to all of the major schools of anarchism, most importantly syndicalists, communists, and individualists. Ukrainian anarcho-syndicalists were key participants in the formation of the Nabat. Volin's platform of "united anarchism" was criticised by many of his own anarcho-syndicalist comrades in Russia, who feared the dominance of the anarcho-communists in such an arrangement.

The conference proclaimed that the Russian Revolution was the beginning of a world revolution that would overthrow capitalism and replace it with communism. But they criticised the Bolshevik model of achieving this through the "dictatorship of the proletariat", instead proposing non-party councils, factory committees and poor peasant committees to oversee a self-managed economy. The conference also resolved to establish anarchist partisan bands to fight against the counter-revolutionary White movement, recognising the insurgent forces under Nestor Makhno to be the best option for creating an anarchist armed force. The Nabat cautioned Makhno against launching an uprising without aid and urged him to wait for the arrival of the Bolsheviks to Ukraine, but Makhno pressed on with his insurgency, not wanting to lose the initiative against the Central Powers.

=== Joining the Makhnovist movement ===
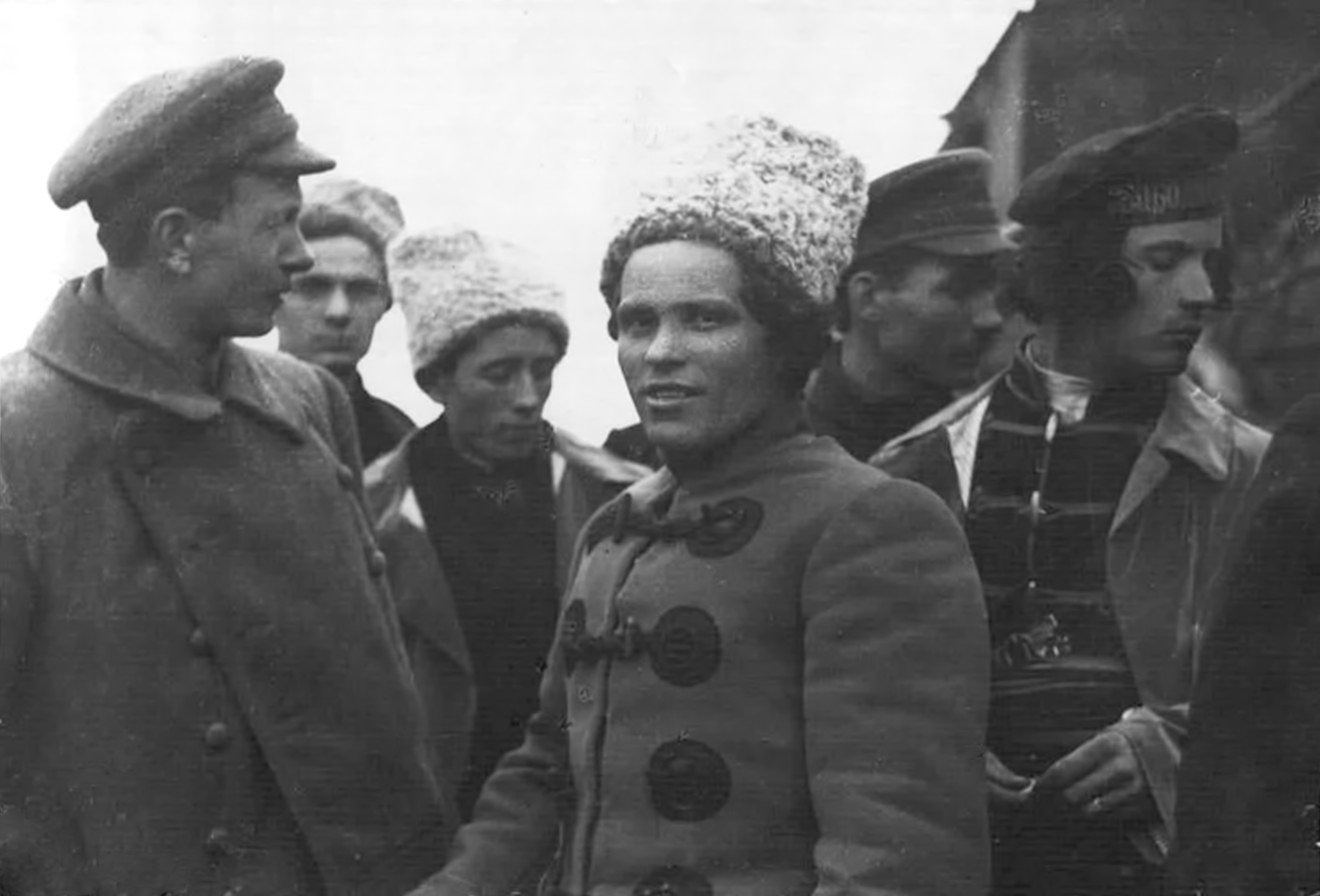
Members of the Revolutionary Insurgent Army of Ukraine, including Nestor Makhno (center)

In January 1919, the Nabat made contact with Viktor Bilash, who brought the organisation into the fold of the Makhnovshchina. The Nabat established a branch in the Makhnovist capital of Huliaipole, providing the Makhnovist movement with literature and activists. Volin and Aron Baron, as the two principal theoreticians of the Nabat, called for the Makhnovshchina to carry out an anarchist "third revolution". Peter Arshinov would be the anarchist figure who gained the most influence in the movement, working with Makhno to shape the Makhnovist programme of free soviets. According to Bolshevik commissar Yakov Yakovlev, under the influence of the Nabat, Makhno began quoting Pierre-Joseph Proudhon and Mikhail Bakunin to justify his actions, which Yakovlev alleged to include "drunken revelry, banditry, theft, and pogroms". The Nabat soon came under Bolshevik harassment, after publishing an appeal to soldiers of the Red Army that urged them to mutiny and overthrow the Soviet government. The organisation appealed for help from the Makhnovists, but harassment continued. On 12–16 February 1919, delegates from the Nabat participated in the Second Regional Congress of Peasants, Workers and Insurgents, which criticised the repressive actions of the Bolsheviks in Ukraine and established a Military Revolutionary Council as the executive organ of the Makhnovist movement.

In March 1919, the Nabat took up editorship of the Makhnovist movement's newspapers, which were printed in the Russian language from Kharkiv. In response to the spread of epidemic typhus, a decree was published in Nabat that demanded the improvement of personal hygiene, under threat of punishment. In that same month, the Nabat also published an advertisement that it was forming its own armed regiment in Huliaipole.

On 2–7 April 1919, the Nabat held its first congress in Yelyzavethrad, where the organisation resolved to commit itself fully to participating in the Makhnovist movement. It soon became an influential force within the movement. When the congress discussed the alliance between the Makhnovists and Bolsheviks, the congress was notable for being relatively pro-Soviet, with the exception of one anti-communist delegate from Huliaipole. Senya Fleshin denounced the Bolsheviks for seizing control of the workers' councils and for establishing a police state in Russia. As a result, the congress opposed anarchist participation in the Bolshevik-dominated Soviets, due to their tendencies towards centralisation. When discussion turned to the organisation of a Revolutionary Insurgent Army, the congress called for it to be established from the bottom-up on a voluntary and egalitarian basis, opposing the hierarchical and militarist conception of the Red Army, which the Nabat believed would inevitably become reactionary. But Makhno himself did not abide by the decisions of the Yelyzavethrad congress, which were taken without his presence.

=== Repression ===
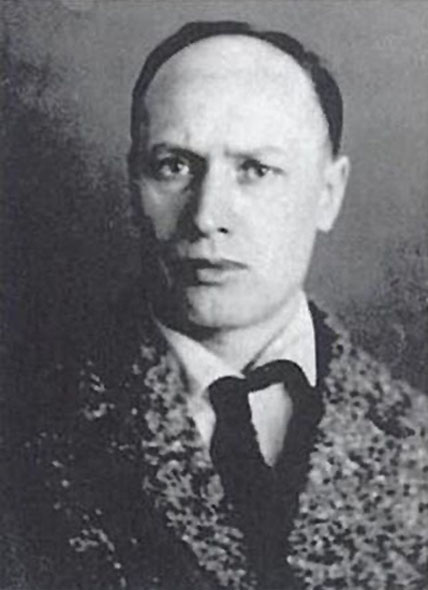
Peter Arshinov, a Russian anarchist intellectual who edited the various newspapers of the Makhnovist movement, including the Nabat.

By this time, the Nabat was facing increasing political repression by the Cheka, which harassed anarchists in Kharkiv and arrested a number of its members in Katernyoslav, including one member of the secretariat. In mid-May 1919, the Nabat secretariat decided to move its headquarters from the hostile climate in Kharkiv to safety in Huliaipole. Other Russian anarchists, including Peter Arshinov and Aron Baron, also began to flee to southern Ukraine, seeking refuge in the area under Makhnovist control. There, Arshinov joined the Nabat and began work editing the Makhnovist movement's main newspaper The Road to Freedom.

In May 1919, the Makhnovists issued a proclamation that denounced the rebel leader Nykyfor Hryhoriv as a counter-revolutionary and an antisemite, in an article that Peter Arshinov signed, and published in Nabat. Members of the Nabat, such as Yakiv Sukhovolski, publicly blamed the rise of Hryhoriv on the authoritarian policies of the Bolshevik party, which it claimed had driven insurgents away from its own cause. Volin himself became embroiled in a polemic with Leon Trotsky, with the two publishing articles denouncing the other respectively in the Nabat and the Zvezda.

Following the break between the Bolsheviks and the Makhnovists in June 1919, the Nabat newspaper was banned by the Cheka for criticising the Bolsheviks and the organisation itself was dispersed by the government, forcing more of its members into the arms of the Makhnovshchina. In August 1919, more members of the Nabat joined the Makhnovshchina during its retreat to Uman. One Makhnovist detachment was even dispatched to rescue Volin, who was a prisoner of the Ukrainian People's Army. Upon arrival, Volin was quickly elected as chairman of the Military Revolutionary Council and joined the editorial board of The Road to Freedom. From these positions, Volin took a leading role in civilian affairs, while military command remained in the hands of Nestor Makhno himself.

=== Break with the Makhnovists ===
After the insurgent victory at the battle of Peregonovka, the insurgents occupied much of southern Ukraine, where they proclaimed the extension of freedom of speech and freedom of the press to all socialist organisations. This allowed the Nabat to resume publication in November 1919, beginning its new run by declaring that a "third revolution" had been initiated by the Makhnovshchina. As the Red Army moved into Ukraine at the end of 1919, the Nabat called for the revolutionary elements of the Red Army to unite with the Revolutionary Insurgent Army, in order to work together in a mass movement against the counter-revolution. Despite the Nabat's pleas for Makhno to prevent it, the Insurgent Army began to disintegrate in the face of the Red advance.

In February 1920, the Nabat's secretariat held a secret meeting in Kharkiv, where they dissaffiliated themselves from the Makhnovshchina, declaring Nestor Makhno himself unfit to lead the movement. Although they still maintained contact with the Makhnovshchina, they decided to shift their attentions from supporting the Makhnovist movement to concentrating on fomenting revolution in the cities. At another meeting the following month, the Nabat declared the need for anarchists to participate in the revolutionary struggle, but they disputed the anarchist character of the Insurgent Army, highlighting issues of alcoholism and antisemitism within the ranks.

But in April 1920, the Nabat held a larger meeting in Kharkiv, which reversed the course set by the secretariat. Renewed political repression by the Bolsheviks had forced them to again shift their attentions back towards the countryside and start working closer with the Makhnovists, resolving to intensify their work within the Makhnovist movement in order to shape it into a specifically anarchist revolutionary vanguard. In their newspaper, the organisation declared that Ukrainian anarchists needed to close ranks with the Makhnovshchina, in the face of the advance by the White movement. At the beginning of June 1920, the secretariat of the Nabat attempted to negotiate an armistice with the Ukrainian Soviet government, but their offers were rebuffed.

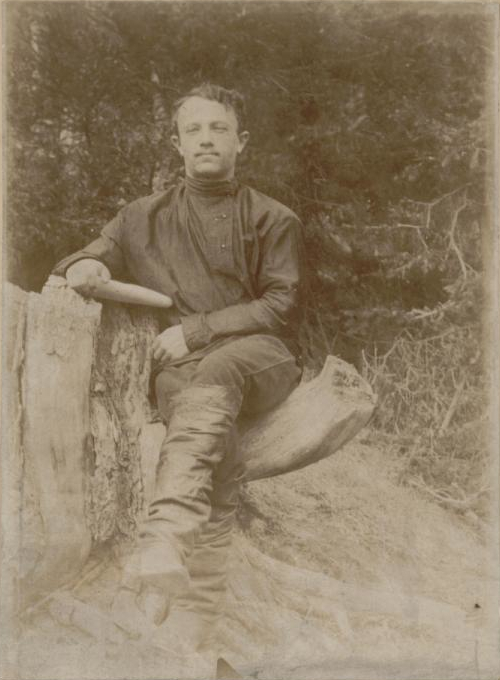
Aron Baron, leader of the Nabat delegation to the Makhnovshchina and de facto political leader of the Makhnovist movement in 1920.

The Nabat considered it necessary for the Makhnovshchina to stop fighting a mobile guerrilla insurrection and instead to permanently capture territory, where it could begin construction of a classless society. The Nabat dispatched a delegation, consisting of Aron Baron, Isaac Teper and Yakiv Sukhovolski, to secure an agreement with Makhno on these terms. Now integrated into the centre of the Makhnovshchina, the three delegates began to clash with the insurgent command. As the new de facto political leader of the movement, Baron began to interfere with military decisions and argued with Makhno over which territory they would capture to establish anarchism - with Makhno insisting on it being his home region. Dmitry Popov, frustrated with the influence of these "outside anarchists", even threatened to kill the delegates himself. Makhno himself became frustrated with the Nabat members, whose intermittent presence in the movement and lack of participation in the armed struggle led Makhno to label them as "tourists".

On 3–8 September 1920, the Nabat held a conference in Kharkiv. A fresh sense of disillusionment with the Makhnovist movement permeated the conference, which was dominated by the three delegates. Baron passed a resolution against the Makhnovshchina, although this was opposed by a minority that still supported Makhno, including Yakiv Sukhovolski, Yosif Gotman and Peter Arshinov. Sukhovolski and Gotman were dispatched to repair ties with the Makhnovists, but disappeared en route.

=== Dissolution ===
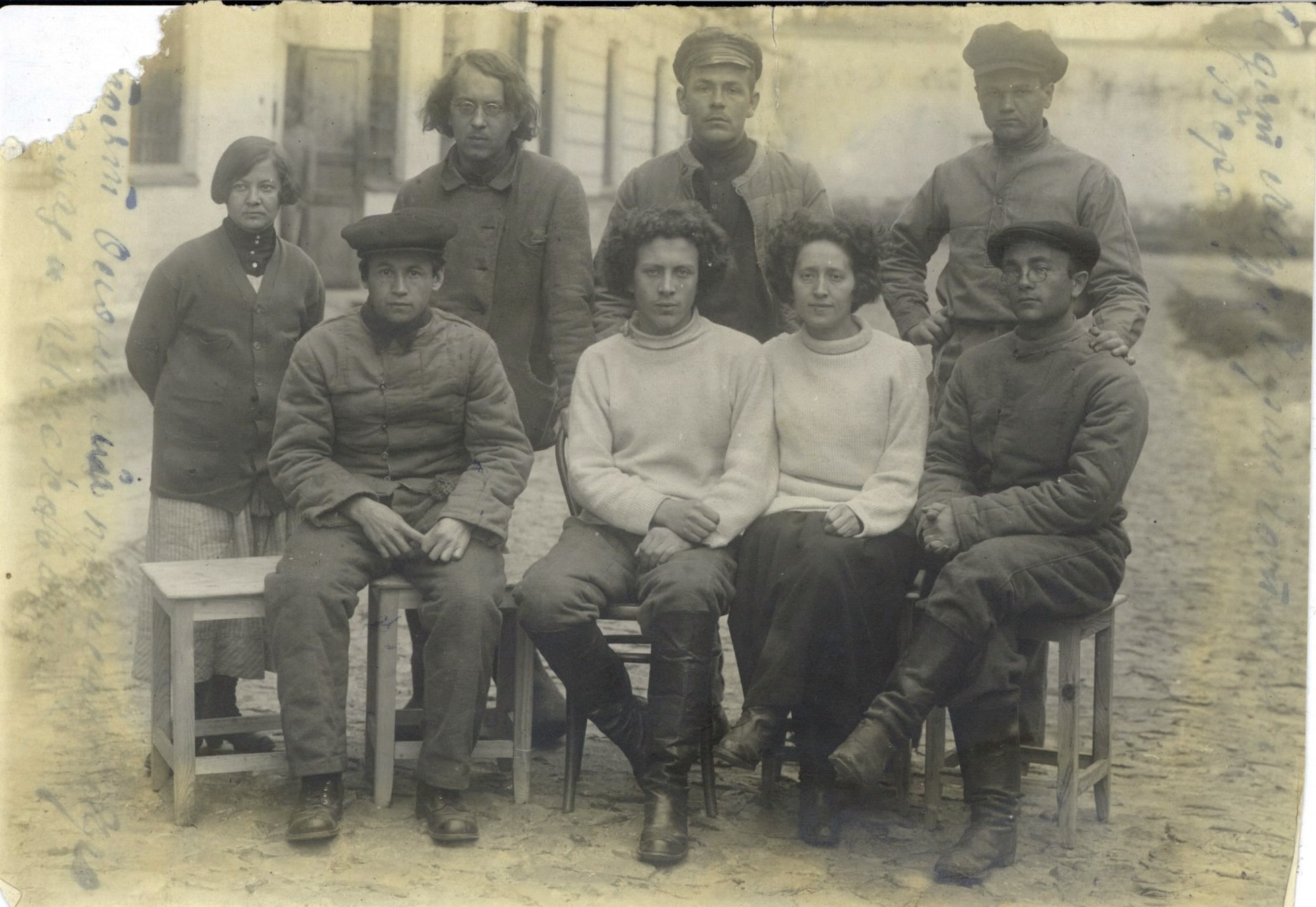
Members of the Nabat in Kharkiv (1922)

In October 1920, the Starobilsk agreement between the Bolsheviks and the Makhnovists was ratified, promulgating an amnesty for anarchist political prisoners, allowing for the release of the Nabat's members from prison and extending them the right to freedom of association. On 4 November 1920, the Nabat newspaper resumed publication and the organisation immediately began planning an anarchist congress to be held in Kharkiv at the beginning of December. Volin, having been released from prison, began negotiating with the government of Christian Rakovsky over the implementation of the agreement's fourth clause, which would have provided autonomy to the Makhnovshchina. But following the Soviet victory at the siege of Perekop, on 26 November, the Bolsheviks carried out a surprise attack against the Makhnovshchina and arrested almost all of the Nabat's members in Kharkiv, destroying the organisation. The planned anarchist congress never took place.

The leaders of the Nabat were transferred to the prisons of Moscow, where they staged a hunger strike in order to attract the attention of syndicalist delegates to the Profintern congress. Amid widespread protest against their imprisonment, they were finally released in January 1922, by order of Vladimir Lenin, who decreed they leave the country immediately. Other prominent anarchists within Ukraine were arrested and killed without trial. The environment of fear created by the Bolshevik party caused many surviving prominent anarchists to flee the country for a safer environment outside of Soviet control. Arshinov, Makhno and Volin and Nestor Makhno were among those who fled into exile.

=== Exile ===
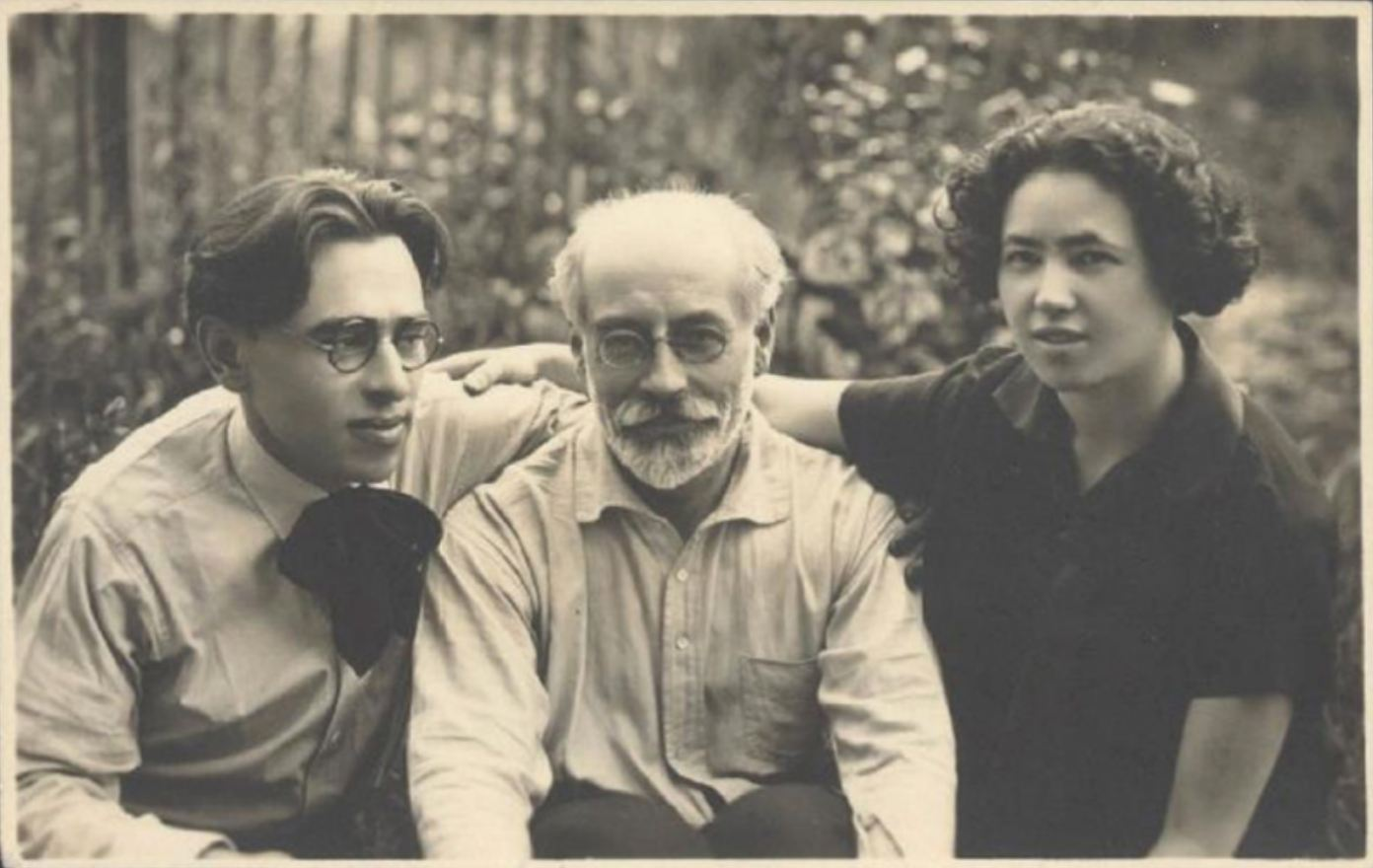
Senya Fleshin (left), Volin (center) and Mollie Steimer (right), former members of the Nabat in exile in Berlin.

Exiled in Berlin, Volin and Arshinov established a monthly journal The Anarchist Herald (Russian: Анархический Вестник), published a History of the Makhnovist movement, and worked together with Alexander Berkman to provide prisoner support for anarchist political prisoners in the Soviet Union. On 22 July 1923, Halyna Kuzmenko signed a statement requesting that the Bolshevik government release remaining Nabat members from prison and cease political repression against the anarchist movement, in return for the cessation of hostile operations by the insurgents, but her request was not granted.

The exiled anarchists of the Nabat turned their attentions to answering why their movement had failed in Ukraine. Mark Mratchny began to advocate for a "transitional economy and political stage for the revolution", to be handled by free soviets. Levandovsky accused the Makhnovists of operating its own Cheka, in the form of the Kontrrazvedka, and accused Makhno himself of running a military dictatorship. Meanwhile, Isaac Teper claimed that it had been the Nabat itself that directed the Makhnovshchina, depicting Aron Baron as the movement's dictator. On 20 June 1926, Peter Arshinov published his Organizational Platform, which advocated for anarcho-communists to form a tightly coordinated organisation, based on the principles of tactical and theoretical unity, collective responsibility and federalism. Volin fiercely criticised this Platform, considering it be an attempt to form an anarchist political party along bureaucratic and centralist lines. Volin instead put forward his own proposal for a unified anarchist organisation, which he called the anarchist synthesis.

=== Successor organisations ===
In 1922, anarchists in Kharkiv established a new anarchist federation on the basis of the Nabat's political platform. The Kharkiv Nabat gained support among civil servants, rail workers and students at the Kharkiv Polytechnic Institute. In 1923 and early 1924, it organised strike actions, illegally printed anarchist literature and made contact with anarchists throughout Russia and Ukraine. In April 1924, the Cheka launched an operation against the organisation's centres, arresting its activists and shutting down its printing press. The Kharkiv anarchists continued organising, even planning an All-Union anarchist congress for August 1924, which prompted another wave of arrests; more than 70 of the city's anarchists were arrested.

Over the course of the late 1920s, the Kharkiv anarchists continued their activities on a smaller scale. After the Makhnovist Viktor Bilash was released from prison, he made contact with them and other anarchists throughout southern Ukraine, including an underground group led by Abram Budanov. By 1930, the Kharkiv anarchist movement had experienced a surge in activity, as the sentences of many of its imprisoned and exiled members ended, allowing them to return to activism. They re-established the Kharkiv Nabat organisation, which brought together many clandestine organisers. The reformed Kharkiv Nabat was agitated by Joseph Stalin's collectivisation programmes and the subsequent Holodomor, which prompted them to gather funds for the establishment of a clandestine printing press. They also reestablished links with other Ukrainian anarchists, including some Nabat activists who were exiled in Russia. They planned to hold a congress of Ukrainian anarchist organisations and reestablish the Ukrainian Confederation of Anarchist Organisations, but in February 1934, the GRU launched a crackdown on the anarchist movement, arresting dozens of anarchists in Kharkiv alone and breaking up two of its artels. By the late 1930s, the Ukrainian anarchist movement had been effectively suppressed.

== Organization ==
=== Structure ===
Nabat had a rigid and disciplined organizational structure. The purpose of this organization and discipline was to make Nabat a healthy syndicate and rise above the differences of opinion of the various schools of thought of anarchism. It was organized by federal principles, with regional components that were answerable to each other about decisions made during the general Assemblies, even when such decisions were passed by a simple majority. The Secretariat, a small leading body, oversaw the workings of Nabat. The Secretariat was seen as “technically executive” but had rather expansive duties, including guiding the Confederation ideologically, managing the monies of Nabat, publishing the newspaper and other propaganda activities, and controlling what militants the Confederation had. The organization was described by Volin as "union, on a basis of federalism with some of the elements of a natural, free, and technical centralization, which is to say...fusion between fraternal and free discipline and collective responsibility."

The Nabat had branches in many of Ukraine's major cities. It also helped establish a Union of Atheists and developed a youth wing, which grew particularly large in southern Ukraine.

=== Members ===
- Peter Arshinov
- Aron Baron
- Fanya Baron
- Nikolai Dolenko
- Senya Fleshin
- Yosif Gotman
- Anatolii Horelik
- Mark Mratchny
- Yakiv Sukhovolski
- Olha Taratuta
- Isaac Teper
- Volin

== See also ==
- Borotbists – 1918–1920 political party in Ukraine
- Communist Party of Ukraine (Soviet Union) – Banned political party in Ukraine
- Left Socialist-Revolutionaries – Revolutionary political party in Russia from 1917 to 1921
- Ukrainian Communist Party
- Ukrainian Radical Party
- Ukrainian Social Democratic Labour Party
- Ukrainian Socialist-Revolutionary Party

== Bibliography ==
- Avrich, Paul (1968). "Russian Anarchists and the Civil War". The Russian Review. 27 (3). Hoboken, New Jersey: Wiley-Blackwell: 296–306. doi:10.2307/127258. ISSN 0036-0341. JSTOR 127258. LCCN 43016148. OCLC 473067959.
- Avrich, Paul (1971) [1967]. The Russian Anarchists. Princeton: Princeton University Press. ISBN 0-691-00766-7. OCLC 1154930946.
- Avrich, Paul (1988). "V. M. Eikhenbaum (Volin): The Man and His Book". Anarchist Portraits. Princeton: Princeton University Press. pp. 125–134. ISBN 978-0-691-04753-9. OCLC 17727270.
- Damier, Vadim (2009) [2000]. Anarcho-syndicalism in the 20th Century. Translated by Archibald, Malcolm. Edmonton: Black Cat Press. ISBN 978-0-9737827-6-9.
- Dubovik, Anatoly (2009). "The Anarchist underground in the Ukraine in the 1920s and 1930s. Outlines of history". After Makhno. Translated by Szarapow. Kate Sharpley Library. ISBN 9781873605844.
- Darch, Colin (2020). Nestor Makhno and Rural Anarchism in Ukraine, 1917-1921. London: Pluto Press. ISBN 9781786805263. OCLC 1225942343.
- Garner, Jason; Benclowicz, José Daniel (2021). "Failure of Praxis? European Revolutionary Anarchism in Revolutionary Situations 1917-1923". Left History. 24 (1): 10–44. doi:10.25071/1913-9632.39573. hdl:11336/184083. ISSN 1192-1927.
- Goodwin, James Frank (2007). "Russian Anarchism and the Bolshevization of Bakunin in the Early Soviet Period". Kritika: Explorations in Russian and Eurasian History. 8 (3): 533–560. doi:10.1353/kri.2007.0035.
- Guérin, Daniel (2005) [1998]. "Voline". No Gods, No Masters: An Anthology of Anarchism. Translated by Sharkey, Paul. Edinburgh: AK Press. pp. 471–493. ISBN 1-904859-25-9. LCCN 2005930956.
- Hemmer, Jeff (2005). What was the Role of the Anarchists in the Russian Revolution? (PDF). Aberdeen: University of Aberdeen. OCLC 84599719. Archived (PDF) from the original on 5 July 2010.
- Malet, Michael (1982). Nestor Makhno in the Russian Civil War. London: Palgrave Macmillan. ISBN 978-0-333-25969-6. OCLC 8514426.
- Marshall, Peter H. (2008) [1992]. "Russia and Ukraine". Demanding the Impossible: A History of Anarchism. London: Harper Perennial. pp. 469–478. ISBN 978-0-00-686245-1. OCLC 218212571.
- Palij, Michael (1976). The Anarchism of Nestor Makhno, 1918–1921: An Aspect of the Ukrainian Revolution. Publications on Russia and Eastern Europe. Seattle: University of Washington Press. ISBN 978-0-295-95511-7. OCLC 81941010.
- Patterson, Sean (2020). Makhno and Memory: Anarchist and Mennonite Narratives of Ukraine's Civil War, 1917–1921. Manitoba: University of Manitoba Press. ISBN 978-0-88755-578-7. OCLC 1134608930.
- Peters, Victor (1970). Nestor Makhno: The Life of an Anarchist. Winnipeg: Echo Books. OCLC 7925080.
- Savchenko, Viktor (2017). "The Anarchist Movement in Ukraine at the Height of the New Economic Policy (1924-25)". East/West: Journal of Ukrainian Studies. 4 (2): 173–186. doi:10.21226/T2CK78. ISSN 2292-7956.
- Schapiro, Leonard (1956). "The Legal Opposition: the Background". The Origin of the Communist Autocracy. Harvard University Press. pp. 170–189. doi:10.1007/978-1-349-09509-4_10.
- Shubin, Aleksandr (2010). "The Makhnovist Movement and the National Question in the Ukraine, 1917–1921". In Hirsch, Steven J.; van der Walt, Lucien (eds.). Anarchism and Syndicalism in the Colonial and Postcolonial World, 1870–1940. Studies in Global Social History. Vol. 6. Leiden: Brill. pp. 147–191. ISBN 9789004188495. OCLC 868808983.
- Skirda, Alexandre (2002). Facing the enemy: A history of anarchist organisation. Translated by Sharkey, Paul. Oakland: AK Press. ISBN 1902593197. OCLC 490977034.
- Skirda, Alexandre (2004) [1982]. Nestor Makhno–Anarchy's Cossack: The Struggle for Free Soviets in the Ukraine 1917–1921. Translated by Sharkey, Paul. Oakland: AK Press. ISBN 978-1-902593-68-5. OCLC 60602979.
- van der Walt, Lucien; Schmidt, Michael (2009). Black Flame: The Revolutionary Class Politics of Anarchism and Syndicalism. Edinburgh: AK Press. pp. 239–270. ISBN 978-1-904859-16-1. LCCN 2006933558. OCLC 1100238201.
