= Isaac Teper =

Ukrainian Jewish anarchist

- יצחק טעפער
- Born: Iliya Hordev
- Years active: 1920
- Organization: Nabat
- Movement: Makhnovshchina

Iliya Hordev (Ukrainian: Ілля Гордєв; Yiddish: איליה גארדעוו), commonly known as Isaac Teper (Ukrainian: Ісаак Тепер; Yiddish: יצחק טעפער), was a Ukrainian Jewish anarchist, who became a leading member of the Nabat and the Makhnovist movement in 1920. His account of the movement's history, published in 1924, provided a key primary source for historiography about the movement.

== Biography ==
In April 1920, a Nabat meeting in Kharkiv resolved to renew their participation in the Makhnovist movement and dispatched a three-man delegation to the insurgent command. Teper, along with Aron Baron and Yakiv Sukhovolski, linked up with the insurgent command. But they quickly came into conflict with the military leadership, with one case of an argument between Teper and Dmitry Popov ending with Popov threatening to have Teper killed.

In August 1920, Nestor Makhno met with Teper and tasked him with securing an agreement with the Ukrainian Soviet government against the Army of Wrangel. The next month, he attended a Nabat conference in Kharkiv, where Baron passed an anti-Makhnovist resolution. Nevertheless, by October 1920, the Starobilsk agreement between the Makhnovists and the Bolsheviks was ratified, securing the release of Nabat members from prison. During the brief period of armistice between the two factions, Teper oversaw the publication of The Makhnovist Voice (Ukrainian: Голос Махновца, romanized: Holos Makhnovtsa) in Kharkiv. Dmitry Popov, an opponent of the agreement with the Bolsheviks, published a series of anti-Bolshevik articles in the paper. According to Teper, Popov was a staunch anti-communist and had set himself the goal of killing 300 communists, but only managed to kill 200 before his own death.

On 26 November 1920, the leadership of the Nabat was arrested in Kharkiv. Teper was captured by the Cheka and wrote a book about his experiences in prison, likely supervised by the Cheka. In his book, Teper rejected allegations that Nestor Makhno was a Ukrainian nationalist and an antisemite, largely attributing cases of antisemitism within the Insurgent Army to units with criminal or nationalist inclinations. He also detailed a case when Makhno insisted that an insurgent, charged with having raped a woman, be shot. But the tribunal narrowly voted to relieve him from command and place him on the front, where he died shortly thereafter. His criticisms for the movement were largely reserved for his own former organisation - the Nabat - which he claimed to be the real director of the Makhnovshchina, even depicting Aron Baron as the movement's dictator. In historiography, the book has been valued for its reprinting of the Starobilsk agreement. Teper's account was later criticised in Soviet historiography, with Teper being accused of attempting to rehabilitate Makhno.

== Bibliography ==
- Darch, Colin (2020). Nestor Makhno and Rural Anarchism in Ukraine, 1917-1921. London: Pluto Press. ISBN 9781786805263. OCLC 1225942343.
- Malet, Michael (1982). Nestor Makhno in the Russian Civil War. London: Palgrave Macmillan. ISBN 978-0-333-25969-6. OCLC 8514426.
- Skirda, Alexandre (2004) [1982]. Nestor Makhno–Anarchy's Cossack: The Struggle for Free Soviets in the Ukraine 1917–1921. Translated by Sharkey, Paul. Oakland: AK Press. ISBN 978-1-902593-68-5. OCLC 60602979.
