= Yosif Gotman =

- יוסף גאָטמאַן
- Born: 1890; Odesa, Russian Empire
- Died: November 1920 (aged 29–30); Millerovo, Russian Soviet Republic
- Cause of death: Execution by firing squad
- Other name: The Emigrant
- Occupations: Financial adviser, teacher, writer
- Years active: 1905–1920
- Organization: Nabat
- Movement: Makhnovshchina
- Criminal charges: Anti-Soviet agitation

Yosif Isaakovich Gotman (Ukrainian: Йосиф Ісаакович Готман; 1890–1920), also known by his nom de plure Yosif the Emigrant, was a Ukrainian anarchist and a leading member of the Nabat and the Makhnovshchina.

== Biography ==
Yosif was born into a Ukrainian Jewish family. Following the suppression of the 1905 Revolution, he emigrated to the United States, where he became involved in the activities of the Union of Russian Workers. With the outbreak of the 1917 Revolution, Gotman returned to Ukraine, joining the resurgent anarcho-syndicalist movement in Odesa as a labor organizer. Following the invasion of Ukraine by the Central Powers, he participated in the insurgency against the Ukrainian State.

Following the ousting of the occupation forces in November 1918, he participated in the establishment of a Ukrainian Anarchist Confederation known as the Nabat and became one of its leading members in the secretariat in Kharkiv. He quickly became known by his nom de plure "The Emigrant", due to his years spent in the Americas. In March 1919, he began forming links between the Nabat and the Makhnovist movement, although he was initially skeptical about its activities.

Following the repression of the Nabat by the Bolsheviks in August 1919, Gotman and Volin fled Kharkiv and joined the Makhnovshchina, immediately involving themselves in the movement's propaganda activities. Gotman himself joined the Makhnovshchina's cultural section and acted as a teacher for the insurgents at camp. They both became close friends of Nestor Makhno himself, which led them to join the Military Revolutionary Council, the Makhnovist movement's executive organ. In January 1920, Gotman was arrested by the Cheka in Oleksandrivsk on charges of anti-Soviet agitation, but was later released under the terms of the Starobilsk agreement.

In August 1920 Gotman was visited by Alexander Berkman at his bookshop, the Volnoe Bratstvo (Free Brotherhood) in Kharkiv. He told Berkman of his dislike for the Bolsheviks and his admiration of the Makhnovshchina, which he claimed to represent "the real spirit of October". In September 1920, at a clandestine conference of the Nabat held in Kharkiv, Yosif opposed an anti-Makhnovist resolution issued by Aron Baron. Yosif attempted to reach Makhno to recover the relationship between the Nabat and the Makhnovshchina. But on 26 November, the Bolsheviks initiated a campaign of political repression against the Ukrainian anarchists, arresting and imprisoning the Nabat's leading members. While on his way to the insurgent headquarters, Gotman was arrested and executed by the Cheka.

== Bibliography ==
- Darch, Colin (2020). Nestor Makhno and Rural Anarchism in Ukraine, 1917–1921. London: Pluto Press. ISBN 9781786805263. OCLC 1225942343.
- Malet, Michael (1982). Nestor Makhno in the Russian Civil War. London: Palgrave Macmillan. ISBN 978-0-333-25969-6. OCLC 8514426.
- Skirda, Alexandre (2004) [1982]. Nestor Makhno–Anarchy's Cossack: The Struggle for Free Soviets in the Ukraine 1917–1921. Translated by Sharkey, Paul. Oakland: AK Press. ISBN 978-1-902593-68-5. OCLC 60602979.
