= Vasyl Kurylenko =

Ukrainian revolutionary

- Василь Куриленко
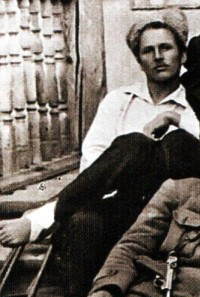
- Vasyl Kurylenko (1919)
- Born: 1890; Novospasivka, Katerynoslav, Russian Empire
- Died: August 1921 (aged 30–31); Ukrainian SSR
- Military career
- Allegiance: Makhnovshchina
- Service: Revolutionary Insurgent Army of Ukraine
- Service years: 1918-1921
- Commands: 9th Regiment
- Conflicts: Ukrainian War of Independence

Vasyl Kurylenko (Ukrainian: Василь Куриленко, died 1921) was a commander in the Revolutionary Insurgent Army of Ukraine.

== Biography ==
In 1890, Vasyl Kurylenko was born in the small village of Novospasivka, where he worked as a cobbler and joined the anarchist movement in 1910. Following the 1917 Revolution, he became the leader of an insurgency against the occupying Central Powers in Berdiansk. After the victory of Nestor Makhno's insurgents over the occupation forces at the battle of Dibrivka, Kurylenko's detachment joined up with the Makhnovist movement, with Kurylenko himself being elected to its first executive committee. In his own account of the Makhnovist movement's history, Volin claims that Kurylenko may have been morally and militarily better-equipped to lead the movement than Makhno himself, although he did not have the same connection with the movement's peasant base.

When the insurgents were integrated into the 3rd Brigade of the 1st Zadneprovsk Ukrainian Soviet Division in February 1919, Kurylenko became commander of the brigade's 9th Regiment. One of Kurylenko's detachments disobeyed his orders and raided a Jewish colony in Tsarekostyantynivka, resulting in the insurgent command declaring that any soldier found guilty of antisemitism or looting in the future would be executed. After the Makhnovists split from the Red Army, Kurylenko's regiment mutinied and joined up again with the reconstituted Insurgent Army.

On 23 June 1920, after a member of the Left Socialist-Revolutionaries approached the Revolutionary Insurgent Council, offering another alliance with the Bolsheviks against Pyotr Wrangel's White movement. Following a back-and-forth debate between the council's members, Kurylenko proposed that the delegation be provided with a clear answer, resulting in a declaration that the insurgents would continue to fight against the Whites, but insisted on their operational independence from the Red Army. But as the Red Army's Southern Front began to give way to Wrangel's Russian Army, proposals for an alliance started to circulate again among the insurgent council. Vasyl Kurylenko and Viktor Bilash came out in favour of the proposed alliance, but other insurgent leaders opposed it. This resulted in the convocation of a general assembly of the Insurgent Army, which voted in favour of the alliance. Kurylenko and Dmitry Popov were subsequently sent to the Ukrainian Bolshevik capital of Kharkiv, as the Makhnovist delegation to negotiate the agreement between the two factions. Despite disagreements over the issue of the Makhnovshchina's autonomy, Kurylenko and Popov ratified the agreement and hostilities were immediately ceased.

As the insurgents began to prosecute guerrilla warfare against the Red Army, Kurylenko took command of a small detachment, isolated from other insurgent cells distributed throughout the region. In March 1921, the insurgent core was ambushed by the Red Army near Melitopol, forcing them to escape towards the sea of Azov, where Makhno decided to split his forces. Kurylenko was dispatched to the area around Berdiansk and Mariupol, where he was ordered to seek and destroy a local unit of the Cheka, in revenge for their killing of an insurgent's wife and infant child. Kurylenko completed his mission, personally executing the Chekists himself. They then made for their rendezvous with other insurgent detachments, set by Makhno to take place in Poltava in May 1921. After Kurylenko's detachment made the rendezvous, the reunited insurgent force consisted of 2,000 cavalry and multiple infantry regiments, which led attacks against requisitioning units in Poltava and Kharkiv.

By August 1921, the insurgent movement had been militarily defeated, with many of its commanders, including Kurylenko, being killed in battle.

== Bibliography ==
- Darch, Colin (2020). Nestor Makhno and Rural Anarchism in Ukraine, 1917-1921. London: Pluto Press. ISBN 9781786805263. OCLC 1225942343.
- Malet, Michael (1982). Nestor Makhno in the Russian Civil War. London: Palgrave Macmillan. ISBN 978-0-333-25969-6. OCLC 8514426.
- Skirda, Alexandre (2004) [1982]. Nestor Makhno–Anarchy's Cossack: The Struggle for Free Soviets in the Ukraine 1917–1921. Translated by Sharkey, Paul. Oakland: AK Press. ISBN 978-1-902593-68-5. OCLC 60602979.
