= Dmitry Ivanovich Popov =

Russian revolutionary (1892–1921)

- Дмитрий Иванович Попов
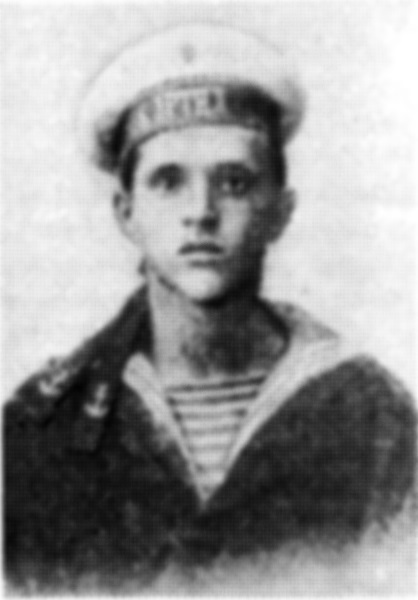
- Dmitry Ivanovich Popov with his sailor uniform

Secretary of the Revolutionary Insurgent Council
- In office 31 January 1920 – 26 November 1920
- Preceded by: Volin
- Succeeded by: Office disestablished

Personal details
- Born: 1892 Kononovo, Moscow, Russian Empire
- Died: 1 May 1921 (aged 28–29) Moscow, Russian Soviet Federative Socialist Republic
- Cause of death: Execution by firing squad
- Party: Left Socialist-Revolutionaries
- Profession: Sailor

Military service
- Allegiance: Russian Empire (1914-1917); RSFSR (1917-1918); Makhnovshchina (1919-1920)
- Branch/service: Imperial Russian Navy (1914-1917); Red Guards (1917-1918); Revolutionary Insurgent Army of Ukraine (1919-1920)
- Years of service: 1914-1920
- Battles/wars: World War I; October Revolution; Russian Civil War; Left SR uprising; Ukrainian War of Independence

Dmitry Ivanovich Popov (Russian: Дмитрий Иванович Попов; 1892–1921) was a Russian sailor and Left Socialist-Revolutionary that led the Left SR uprising against the Bolsheviks in July 1918. Following the suppression of the uprising, he joined the Revolutionary Insurgent Army of Ukraine and became a leading member, spearheading the negotiations between the Makhnovists and the Bolsheviks until his arrest and execution by the Cheka.

== Biography ==
During World War I, Popov had been a sailor in the Black Sea Fleet, going on to join the Left Socialist-Revolutionaries after the outbreak of the Russian Revolution. In July 1918, Popov became a leading figure in the Left SR uprising, during which he attempted to oust the Bolsheviks from power. The uprising failed, largely due to the hesitancy with which they carried it out: treating captured Bolsheviks with mercy and refusing to march on the headquarters of the Central Committee.

By the autumn of 1918, the left SRs had gained an influence in the Makhnovshchina, working closely together with the Makhnovists in their mutual fight against the White movement and desire for the establishment free soviets. Following the suppression of the left SR uprising in Moscow, Popov had led a left SR detachment to fight against the White movement in Ukraine and, according to the Soviet historian Mikhail Kubanin, pledged himself to kill 300 Bolsheviks (of which he managed to kill 200). By April 1919, Popov had joined the Makhnovists.

Although Left SR influence had mostly waned by the time of the White movement's advance on Moscow, Popov quickly became a leading member of the insurgent staff and Makhno's personal assistant. By the turn of 1920, Popov had revived the Makhnovist counterintelligence agency (kontrrazvedka), but after complaints against it by Aaron Baron, Viktor Bilash and Yakiv Sukhovolski, the Military Revolutionary Council (VRS) ordered its restriction to military activities, with Halyna Kuzmenko establishing a new counter-intelligence body to replace it.

Following the fall of Nikopol in January 1920, the VRS dissolved and was replaced by a seven-member Soviet of Revolutionary Insurgents, with Dmitri Popov being elected as its first secretary. Throughout 1920, Popov got into frequent arguments with Aron Baron and Isaac Teper, two Russian anarchists of the Nabat that Popov resented for reducing his own influence, at one pointing even threatening the pair.

On 23 June 1920, the insurgent staff held a meeting, during which a member of the Socialist Revolutionary Party attempted to persuade the insurgents to join forces with the Bolsheviks against the White movement. Popov argued against such an alliance, citing the breaking of the Bolshevik-Makhnovist alliance the year before, and claimed that the renewal of an alliance would be of "great prejudice to the cause of revolution". When talks began between the Makhnovists and the Bolsheviks in August 1920, Dmitri Popov and Semen Karetnyk were two of the insurgent command staff that argued against the proposed alliance. However, an insurgent vote on the matter secured a majority for an alliance with the Bolsheviks. By the end of September 1920, the Communist Party of Ukraine had agreed to talks with the Makhnovists and sent a delegation to Starobilsk for negotiations.

Popov was elected as one of the Makhnovist representatives. On 29 September, he held a phone call with the Chairman of the Ukrainian Cheka Vasiliy Mantsev, during which Popov spoke about the "revolutionary purity" of the Makhnovists and mentioned how they had hanged emissaries from South Russia. The two managed to reach an agreement, with Mantsev promising that the insurgents would be allowed to maintain their own command structures and that all anarchist political prisoners would be released. The two factions immediately ceased hostilities, but mutual distrust between the Bolsheviks and Makhnovists persisted even after the end of the negotiations.

On 6 October, Dmitri Popov, Semen Karetnyk and Viktor Bilash met the Bolshevik negotiator at Starobilsk to sign their provisional agreement. By the following day, they had arranged an armistice and decided that a final draft of the "Political-Military Alliance" would be agreed upon in Kharkiv. Popov himself, along with Vasyl Kurylenko and Abram Budanov, went to the Ukrainian Soviet capital to work out the final touches, signing the agreement by 15 October.

Part of the Makhnovist delegation, including Popov, elected to stay behind in Kharkiv, in order to participate in an upcoming General Congress of Anarchists in November 1920. Speaking to large crowds at a number of meetings and debates in the city, Popov proclaimed the necessity of restoring power to the free soviets and demanded the extension of autonomy to the Makhnovshchina. In their newspaper The Makhnovist Voice, Popov elaborated his complaints about the Ukrainian Soviet government, publishing three issues up until 21 November. In its last issue, Popov celebrated the Makhnovist victory at Perekop and used the opportunity to demand the immediate release of all anarchist political prisoners.

On 26 November 1920, the entire Makhnovist delegation (including Popov) was arrested and deported to Moscow, where they were executed by firing squad, under orders of Felix Dzerzhinsky.

== Bibliography ==
- Darch, Colin (2020). Nestor Makhno and Rural Anarchism in Ukraine, 1917-1921. London: Pluto Press. ISBN 9781786805263. OCLC 1225942343.
- Malet, Michael (1982). Nestor Makhno in the Russian Civil War. London: Palgrave Macmillan. ISBN 978-0-333-25969-6. OCLC 8514426.
- Skirda, Alexandre (2004) [1982]. Nestor Makhno–Anarchy's Cossack: The Struggle for Free Soviets in the Ukraine 1917–1921. Translated by Sharkey, Paul. Oakland: AK Press. ISBN 978-1-902593-68-5. OCLC 60602979.
