= Viktor Bilash =

Ukrainian military commander (1893–1938)

- Віктор Білаш
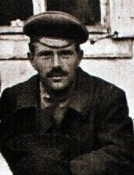

Otaman of the Makhnovshchina
- In office 13 August 1921 – c. 1923
- Preceded by: Nestor Makhno
- Succeeded by: Position disestablished

Personal details
- Born: 1893 Novospasivka, Mariupolsky, Katerynoslav, Russian Empire
- Died: 29 January 1938 (aged 44–45) Kharkiv, Ukrainian SSR, Soviet Union
- Cause of death: Execution by firing squad

Military service
- Allegiance: Makhnovshchina; Ukrainian SSR (1919)
- Service: Revolutionary Insurgent Army of Ukraine; Ukrainian Soviet Army (February–June 1919)
- Years of service: 1918–1923
- Rank: Chief of staff
- Commands: 2nd Brigade (1919-1920); Insurgent Staff (1919-1922); 3rd Trans-Dnepr Brigade (February–April 1919); 7th Ukrainian Soviet Division (April–June 1919)
- Battles/wars: Russian Civil War; Ukrainian War of Independence

Viktor Fedorovych Bilash (Ukrainian: Віктор Федорович Білаш; 1893 – 29 January 1938) was a Ukrainian military commander who was the Chief of Staff of the Revolutionary Insurgent Army of Ukraine (RIAU) under Nestor Makhno during the Russian Civil War. Bilash himself planned many of the Insurgent Army's operations, later becoming its commander in chief after Makhno's flight into exile.

His son, Oleksandr, a World War II veteran, was able to obtain the manuscript of his father's work, with other previously unknown documents in 1993. He subsequently published it together as a book called “The Roads of Nestor Makhno”.

== Biography ==
Viktor Bilash was born in 1893, in the small Pryazovian town of Novospasivka. He worked as a train driver during his youth. Following the invasion of Ukraine by the Central Powers in early 1918, he formed a partisan detachment to fight against them in the Ukrainian War of Independence. Later in the year, he joined up with Nestor Makhno's insurgent forces. In reprisal, the Austro-Hungarian Army shot Viktor's father, grandfather and cousin, and even set his house on fire.

=== Rise to command ===
In December 1918, Bilash first arrived in the insurgent capital of Huliaipole, where he was immediately met with "drunk machine-gunners riding in a tachanka along the main street". During an emergency insurgent conference at Huliaipole in January 1919, Bilash was given the task of summoning a congress for delegates from the front lines, in order to bring the various units under a single military command, with a more comprehensive organizational structure. He went searching for the various disparate detachments on the southern front, visiting units stationed at Polohy, Basan, Mala Tokmachka, Orikhiv and Zherebets. On 3 January, over 40 delegates met for the congress at Polohy, where they elected a general staff and picked Bilash himself to head it as chief of staff. From this post, Bilash became the main strategist of the insurgent movement, planning many of its operations.

The following day, Bilash set about reorganizing the front. He formed the 6,200 insurgents into 5 regiments, each of which was composed of 3 battalions, which were in turn composed of 3 companies, which were in turn composed of three platoons. Each unit elected their own commanders and each regiment appointed its own general staff, with these regimental staffs being headquartered respectively at Basan, Polohy, Orikhiv, Tsarekostyantynivka and Zherebets. Uncooperative commanders of formerly independent units were summoned to the insurgent headquarters and reassigned to planning operations. He then transferred 2,500 of the insurgents to Tsarekostyantynivka and selected Simeon Pravda as his deputy, although he would not end up taking this post. Bilash subsequently instructed all units to prepare for an offensive against South Russia on 9 January, even though the Russian forces under Vladimir May-Mayevsky outnumbered the poorly-equipped insurgents. By 20 January, a series of desertions caused the insurgent ranks under Bilash to swell to 15,000 infantry, 1,000 cavalry and 40 machine guns, which were posted throughout a 150-mile long front line.

Following a White offensive against the insurgent positions, a peasant congress at Dibrivka elected a delegation to negotiate a ceasefire between the various sides and to secure the release of draftees from their military service. But when the delegation met with Bilash at Pokrovske, he informed them that he had already dispatched Oleksiy Chubenko to negotiate an alliance with the Red Army, a decision he had made without informing the civilian congress. On 28 January, Chubenko reported back from his meeting with Pavel Dybenko, where he agreed to the integration of the Insurgent Army into the 1st Zadneprovsk Ukrainian Soviet Division, while ensuring that the insurgents would retain their democratic structure. Bilash himself would fight in the division's 3rd Trans-Dnipro Brigade. Viktor Bilash was subsequently dispatched as part of the insurgent delegation to the Ukrainian Soviet capital of Kharkiv, where he signed the written agreement in early February. While in the city, Bilash also contacted the Nabat and secured from them a shipment of literature to the insurgents, eventually resulting in the establishment of a Nabat group in Huliaipole. Upon Bilash's return to Huliaipole, he reported on the revolutionary activity taking place in the town, where free soviets and agricultural communes had been established.

By April 1919, tensions between the insurgents and their Bolshevik commanders had reached a breaking point, as Dybenko attempted to ban the insurgents' Third Regional Congress. Shortly before Lev Kamenev arrived in Huliaipole on a state visit in May 1919, Makhno cautioned Bilash to be "ready for anything", as he was worried the Bolsheviks may pull some "dirty tricks". By June 1919, the alliance was definitively broken, the Makhnovists withdrew from the Red Army and formed the newly independent Revolutionary Insurgent Army of Ukraine.

=== Consolidation of the Insurgent Army ===
During the subsequent Makhnovist retreat to right-bank Ukraine, Bilash reported that they had turned away all units that wanted to join them, as Makhno was worried about weakening the Soviet front against the White movement. After the Makhnovists joined with the green army of Nykyfor Hryhoriv in Kherson, the insurgent forces were thoroughly consolidated. Viktor Bilash reported that, at this time, the insurgent army numbered "40,000 infantry, 10,000 cavalry, 1,000 machine guns and 20 artillery pieces" with 13,000 additional non-combatants organizing a supply chain, which consisted of "8,000 britzkas and tachanki for the infantry, another 2,000 carriages for the staff, communications and medical, 1,000 carriages with machine guns, 1,000 with artillery supplies and 500 carrying food..." On 1 September, Bilash was elected to the new Military Revolutionary Council (VRS) and took over the newly established general staff, which was responsible for organizing and managing the insurgent army. He would also command the army's 2nd Brigade.

After fight a series of skirmishes with the Volunteer Army, the insurgent army was forced into a retreat, pushing them as far back as Uman. There the insurgents turned around and counterattacked the Whites, defeating them at Peregonovka and opening a path for the Makhnovists to return to left-bank Ukraine. Bilash reported that around 10,000 White troops had been killed during the battle of Peregonovka, while 5,000 more were taken as prisoners of war afterwards and their captured horses were redistributed to the local peasantry.

During the insurgent army's march east, Bilash reported that it covered 373 kilometres within a week, at a rate of 53 kilometres per day. The insurgents rapidly captured numerous cities throughout southern Ukraine, including Kryvyi Rih, Nikopol and Oleksandrivsk, where Bilash was elected to the VRS by a Regional Congress. Bilash himself paused in several places along the way, in order to raise autonomous partisan units to fight the White movement, causing the peasant insurrection to spread "like wildfire". He estimated that, around this time, the Insurgent Army's ranks numbered 250,000 people.

In the occupied territory, Bilash reported that the insurgents carried out a campaign of "Black Terror" against members of the White movement. Along with Aron Baron and Yakiv Sukhovolski, Viktor Bilash complained to the VRS about the activities of Dmitry Popov's revived counter-intelligence body, resulting in its disillusion and replacement with a "Commission for Anti-Makhnovist Activities", led by Halyna Kuzmenko. In December 1919, an argument broke out between the civilian VRS and the insurgent command over the army's extrajudicial execution of Bolsheviks that had participated in the Polonsky conspiracy. The VRS refused to accept Nestor Makhno's account of events and established an investigation commission, consisting of Viktor Bilash, Volin and Mikhail Uralov. But as Bilash and Uralov supported Makhno from the beginning of the investigation, Volin too was brought over to Makhno's side and made an agreement with the insurgent commander, ensuring the VRS maintained its authority over civilian affairs and the insurgent command over military affairs.

=== Guerrilla warfare ===
During the summer of 1920, the insurgents carried out a campaign of guerrilla warfare against the Russian Army. At this period of time, Bilash reported that approximately 45% of the insurgent forces consisted of Red Army deserters. He also reported that some insurgents formed a temporary truce with the Ukrainian People's Army during this period, handing over surplus weapons to them in the regions of Chernihiv, Kherson, Kyiv and Poltava. He noted Makhno's own rhetoric taking on hints of Ukrainian nationalism and anti-Russian sentiment, later reporting that Makhno was preparing a "Universal" announcing that he intended to join the Ukrainian People's Army.

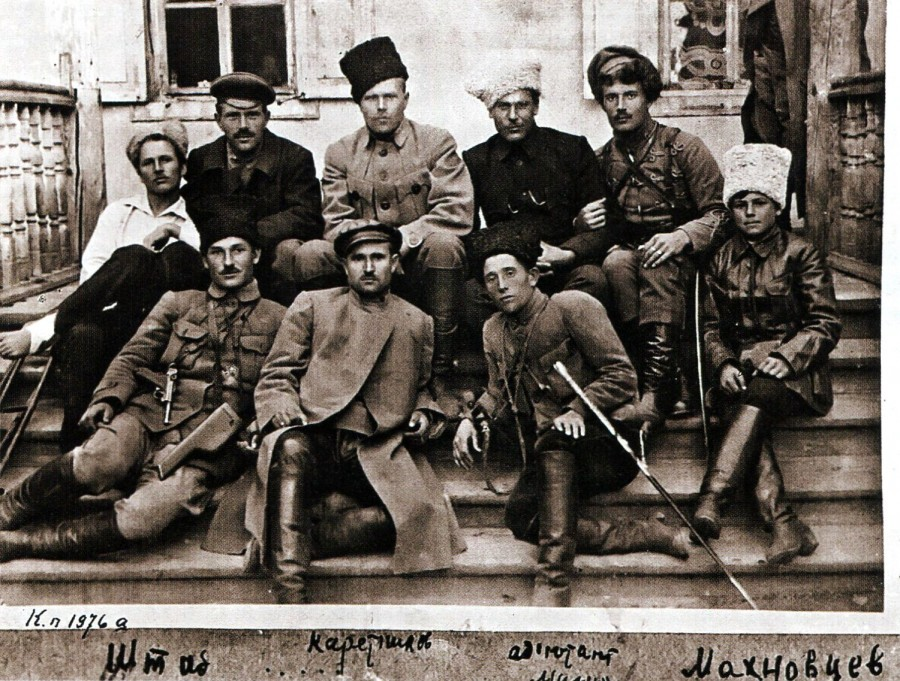
Viktor Bilash (back row, second from the left) sitting for a picture with other members of the insurgent general staff.

When an alliance with the Red Army was proposed at a meeting of the insurgent command on 23 June 1920, Bilash proposed that the insurgents continue to fight against them, in spite of any ongoing peace talks, and agreed with Oleksiy Marchenko that they should avoid any alliance with the Bolsheviks. But by the time that the proposed alliance was brought up again in August 1920, Bilash was among those that supported the proposal. To break the deadlock within the command staff, they called an insurgent general assembly, which voted in favor of the alliance after a lengthy debate. In October 1920, the agreement was signed in Starobilsk by Viktor Bilash, Semen Karetnyk and Dmitry Popov. But even following the formation of an alliance between the Bolsheviks and the Makhnovists, the insurgents still found themselves to be ill-equipped. On 2 November, Bilash telegrammed Mikhail Frunze asking for winter clothing and munitions.

Immediately after the Government of South Russia was ousted from Crimea in November 1920, the Red Army attacked the Makhnovshchina, forcing them back into partisan warfare as part of a generalized anti-Bolshevik uprising. In these final months, Makhno kept Bilash by his side and trained him in his insurgent strategy, before dispatching him elsewhere to carry out guerrilla warfare against the Red Army. By July 1921, it had become clear that the insurgents were facing an imminent defeat by the Red Army, which was pursuing a scorched earth strategy against the Makhnovshchina. About 1,000 of the remaining insurgents held an open meeting, during which a general retreat from Ukraine was discussed. Bilash expressed a desire to move their operations to Anatolia, where the Turkish National Movement's war of independence against the Entente was ongoing, but nothing came of this proposal. On 17 July, he broke away from Makhno's core and took an insurgent detachment to the Kuban region.

=== Final years ===
In August 1921, Makhno decided to leave the country in order to have his wounds treated, leaving the insurgent core under the command of Viktor Bilash. By the autumn, Bilash's detachment was surrounded in a surprise attack by the Red Army at Znamianka and largely wiped out. Some of the survivors managed to flee to Romania or Poland. On 23 September, a wounded Bilash was captured by the Cheka and moved to a prison in Kharkiv, where he began writing his memoirs about the Makhnovshchina.

With the Makhnovshchina finally liquidated, the Ukrainian Soviet government pressed charges against the captured insurgents. On 22 April 1922, Bilash gave his testimony to a tribunal of the All-Ukrainian Central Executive Committee, which was trying Makhno in absentia. In 1923, Bilash and other captured members of the insurgent staff were tried and sentenced to death by the Cheka. Bilash's sentence was commuted and instead he was banished to Krasnodar, where he took up work as a mechanic in a Hunters' Union workshop. During the 1930s, while he continued writing his memoirs, he became an agent of the NKVD. But on 16 December 1937, during the height of the Great Purge, he was arrested by the NKVD and sentenced to execution by firing squad. He was killed on 29 January 1938.

== Legacy ==
On 29 April 1976, Bilash was rehabilitated due to "insufficient evidence" against him. Following the dissolution of the Soviet Union and the reinstitution of freedom of the press in Ukraine, a number of works about the Makhnovshchina were published for the first time. In 1993, Viktor Bilash's son Oleksandr published his memoirs Dorogi Nestora Makhno, based on the manuscripts that Viktor had written while imprisoned by the Cheka during the 1920s. It has since become a key primary source for the historiography of the Makhnovshchina.

== Works ==
- Bilash, Viktor; Bilash, Oleksandr (1993). Дороги Нестора Махно [The Roads of Nestor Makhno] (PDF) (in Russian). РВЦ “Проза”. ISBN 5-7707-3814-6. Archived (PDF) from the original on 10 January 2020.

== Bibliography ==
- Darch, Colin (2020). Nestor Makhno and Rural Anarchism in Ukraine, 1917-1921. London: Pluto Press. ISBN 9781786805263. OCLC 1225942343.
- Malet, Michael (1982). Nestor Makhno in the Russian Civil War. London: Palgrave Macmillan. ISBN 978-0-333-25969-6. OCLC 8514426.
- Palij, Michael (1976). The Anarchism of Nestor Makhno, 1918–1921: An Aspect of the Ukrainian Revolution. Publications on Russia and Eastern Europe. Seattle: University of Washington Press. ISBN 978-0-295-95511-7. OCLC 81941010.
- Skirda, Alexandre (2004) [1982]. Nestor Makhno–Anarchy's Cossack: The Struggle for Free Soviets in the Ukraine 1917–1921. Translated by Sharkey, Paul. Oakland: AK Press. ISBN 978-1-902593-68-5. OCLC 60602979.
- Volkovynskyi, Valeriy Mykolayovych (2003). "БІЛАШ Віктор Федорович" [BILASH Viktor Fedorovych]. In Smoliy, V. A. (ed.). Encyclopedia of History of Ukraine (in Ukrainian). Vol. 1. Kyiv: Institute of History of Ukraine.
