= Teper =

Teper (Yiddish: טעפּער) is a Yiddish occupational surname for a potter. Notable people with this name include:

- Doug Teper (born 1958), American politician and businessman from the U.S. state of Georgia
- Erkan Teper (born 1982), German professional boxer
- Isaac Teper, Ukrainian anarchist
- Ios Teper (1915–2013), Soviet Jew in the military
- Meir Teper, American film producer and businessman
