= Anatolii Horelik =

Ukrainian Jewish anarchist activist

- Анатолій Горелік
- Born: Hryhorii Horelik; 12 March 1890; Henichesk, Melitopol, Taurida, Russian Empire
- Died: 15 November 1956 (aged 66); Buenos Aires, Argentina
- Education: Sorbonne University
- Organization(s): Union of Russian Workers, Nabat
- Movement: Anarchism in Ukraine

Hryhorii Horelik (Ukrainian: Григорій Горелік), commonly known by his pseudonym Anatolii Horelik (Ukrainian: Анатолій Горелік; 1890–1956), was a Ukrainian Jewish anarchist activist that agitated in Donbas during the 1917 Revolution.

== Biography ==
Hryhorii Horelik was born into a lower-middle-class family in Henichesk, where he worked in a grocery store. During the 1905 Revolution, he joined the Ukrainian anarchist movement, for which he was arrested. He fled abroad in 1909. He went to study in France, but after the outbreak of World War I, he emigrated to the United States, where he joined the anarcho-syndicalist movement, as a member of the Union of Russian Workers and the Industrial Workers of the World.

After the outbreak of the February Revolution in 1917, Horelik returned from his exile. He moved to Katerynoslav, where he became secretary of the Donbas Anarchist Bureau. When the October Revolution broke out, Horelik's Katerynoslav Anarchist Federation organised a demonstration of 80,000 people, who marched under the anarchist black flag. For three days, Horelik observed the anarchist-led factory committees attempted to bring about workers' self-management. But the process was interrupted when the Bolsheviks cut the city off from supplies, bringing the city under Bolshevik authority. During this period, Horelik reported that anarchist propaganda was widespread, particularly in the countryside, with newspapers and books making their way into the hands of many Ukrainian peasants.

In 1918, Horelik opened up correspondence with more than 1,400 villages in Donbas, speculating that a hypothetical anarchist party in the region could count hundreds of thousands of members. But he blamed the lack of effective anarchist organisation on the "anarchist intelligentsia", who were largely settling in major Russian cities and even collaborating with the Bolshevik government, instead of participating in the building of a libertarian movement, which had been left to the rank-and-file. Horelik's anti-intellectualism was later taken up by Peter Arshinov, who in turn blamed theoretical confusion and chronic disorganization for the failures of the Ukrainian anarchist movement, leading him to formulate platformism.

When Ukraine was occupied by the Central Powers, Horelik went into hiding, participating in the anarchist underground as an educator. Although he was personally opposed to violence, he participated in the Makhnovist movement, as a member of the Nabat. He participated in the establishment of an agricultural commune in Kharkiv, which flourished until its repression by the Cheka in the autumn of 1920.

In October 1920, Horelik reported an incident where multiple detachments of the Red Army approached the Nabat leadership and proposed that they seize power in Ukraine, but Volin and other members rejected this, as they believed in the self-organization of the masses. On 26 November 1920, the leaders of the Nabat, including Horelik, were arrested by the Cheka in Kharkiv and transferred to a prison in Moscow. Months later, the imprisoned leaders of the Nabat staged a hunger strike to attract the attention of syndicalist delegates to the Profintern congress. Amid widespread protest against their imprisonment, they were finally released and deported in January 1922, by order of Vladimir Lenin.

Horelik emigrated to Argentina, where he joined an émigré group of Golos Truda that had been established in Buenos Aires. In 1956, he died in his Argentine exile.

== Bibliography ==
- Avrich, Paul (1971) [1967]. The Russian Anarchists. Princeton: Princeton University Press. ISBN 0-691-00766-7. OCLC 1154930946.
- Beroev, Artur (14 March 2020). "Памяти анархиста — коммуниста Григория Горелика". Budka Glasnosti (in Russian).
- Skirda, Alexandre (2004) [1982]. Nestor Makhno–Anarchy's Cossack: The Struggle for Free Soviets in the Ukraine 1917–1921. Translated by Sharkey, Paul. Oakland: AK Press. ISBN 978-1-902593-68-5. OCLC 60602979.
