= Anarchist synthesis =

Form of anarchist organization

The anarchist synthesis, also known simply as the synthesis or by its earlier name united anarchism, is an organisational principle that seeks unity in diversity, aiming to bring together anarchists of different tendencies into a single federation. Developed mainly by the Russian anarchist Volin and the French anarchist Sébastien Faure, the anarchist synthesis was designed to appeal to communists, syndicalists and individualists alike. According to the synthesis, an anarchist federation ought to be heterogeneous and relatively loosely organised, in order to preserve the individual autonomy of its members.

== History ==
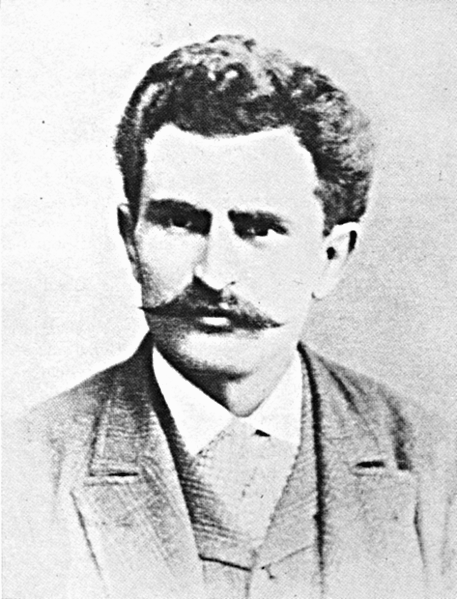
Errico Malatesta, a forerunner of the anarchist synthesis and a leading figure in the Italian anarchist movement.

Since the 1890s, there had been a drive within the anarchist movement to foster cooperation between the various anarchist schools of thought and to unite them across ideological lines. During the dispute between the collectivists and communists, the Italian anarchist Errico Malatesta and the Spanish anarchist Fernando Tarrida del Mármol advocated for anarchists of both tendencies to unite, according to the principle of "anarchism without adjectives".

Over the subsequent decades, Max Nettlau developed this principle into a call for anarchists to unite into a single organisation, which would preserve individual autonomy and encourage mutual aid between its members. The principle of individual autonomy was particularly central to the organisational ideas of Sébastien Faure and Emma Goldman, as well as to the Japanese "pure anarchists" that advocated for a more loosely organised grouping. The Russian anarchist Volin considered all anarchist schools of thought to be valid, advocating for a pluralistic organisation that unites anarchists of different tendencies behind a set of common principles and goals. While Goldman considered the best path to be a loose framework that extended autonomy to each tendency, Volin and Faure would go on to develop a "synthesis" of the different tendencies, with the aim of creating an organisational platform that would be acceptable to the entire anarchist movement.

=== Revolution in Ukraine ===
Following the October Revolution, many Russian anarchists attempted to escape the Red Terror by fleeing to Ukraine. They established their headquarters in Kharkiv, which became the center for their campaign to unify the disorganised anarchist movement into a coordinated revolutionary organisation, which they hoped would be able to combat the rise of Bolshevism. This campaign resulted in the establishment of the Nabat Confederation of Anarchist Organizations, which quickly spread throughout all of Ukraine's major cities.

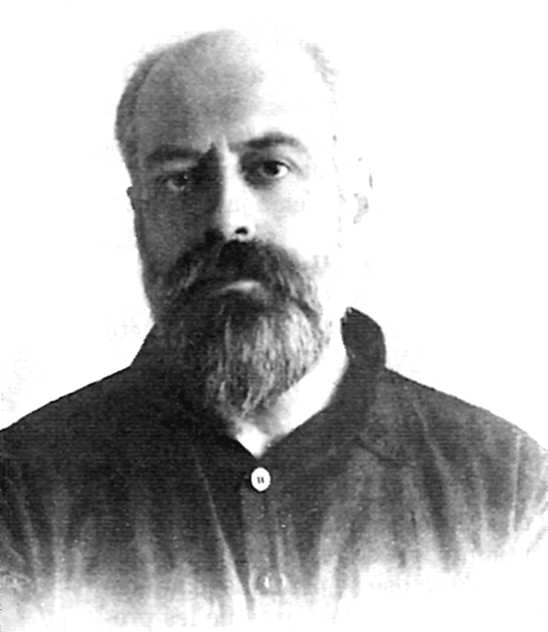
Volin, one of the early proponents of the anarchist synthesis and a leading figure in the Nabat.

The statutes of the Nabat were drawn up by Volin, who established it according to the principles of "united anarchism" (Russian: единый анархизм, romanized: yedinyy anarkhizm). The organization was designed to extend a great deal of autonomy to its membership and be open to members from all of the major anarchist schools of thought: anarcho-communism, anarcho-syndicalism and individualist anarchism. This "united anarchism" was immediately criticised by Volin's former anarcho-syndicalist comrades, who regarded it as an ineffective way to unify the anarchist movement and feared the dominance of anarcho-communists in such an organization.

Despite its establishment according to the principles of "united anarchism", as the Ukrainian Revolution progressed, the Nabat developed into a more tightly organised federation with its own unitary policy. The Nabat's secretariat acted as the organisation's executive, directing the organisation's membership and overseeing its resources. It quickly threw its support behind the Makhnovist movement and the Revolutionary Insurgent Army of Ukraine, which it hoped would spearhead the organisation of the Ukrainian anarchist movement.

=== Synthesis versus the Platform ===
After the Russian and Ukrainian anarchist movements were forced into exile, they experienced a split over organisational principles. Inspired by the model of the Nabat, Volin had proposed the organisation of an anarchist federation, which would account for discipline and collective responsibility by means of "natural, free and technical centralisation", while also accounting for a diversity of anarchist tendencies within the organisation. But members of Delo truda quickly rejected Volin's "synthesis" as incoherent and out of step with anarchist theory. Within the Soviet Union itself, former members of the Nabat had also since gravitated away from Volin's organisational principles.

In June 1926, Peter Arshinov, Nestor Makhno and Ida Mett collaborated on the drafting of The Organisational Platform, which called for the establishment of a specific anarchist organisation according to the principles of ideological and tactical unity, in order to combat chronic disorganisation within the anarchist movement. In April 1927, Volin penned a reply to the Platform, which was co-signed by other exiled anarchists such as Senya Fleshin and Mollie Steimer. The Reply criticised the Platform as running counter to anarchist ideology, accusing the platformists of desiring to establish a centralised anarchist political party and eventually a state, which Volin directly compared to Bolshevism. Volin, Fleshin and Steimer went on to accuse the Delo truda group of anti-intellectualism and even antisemitism.

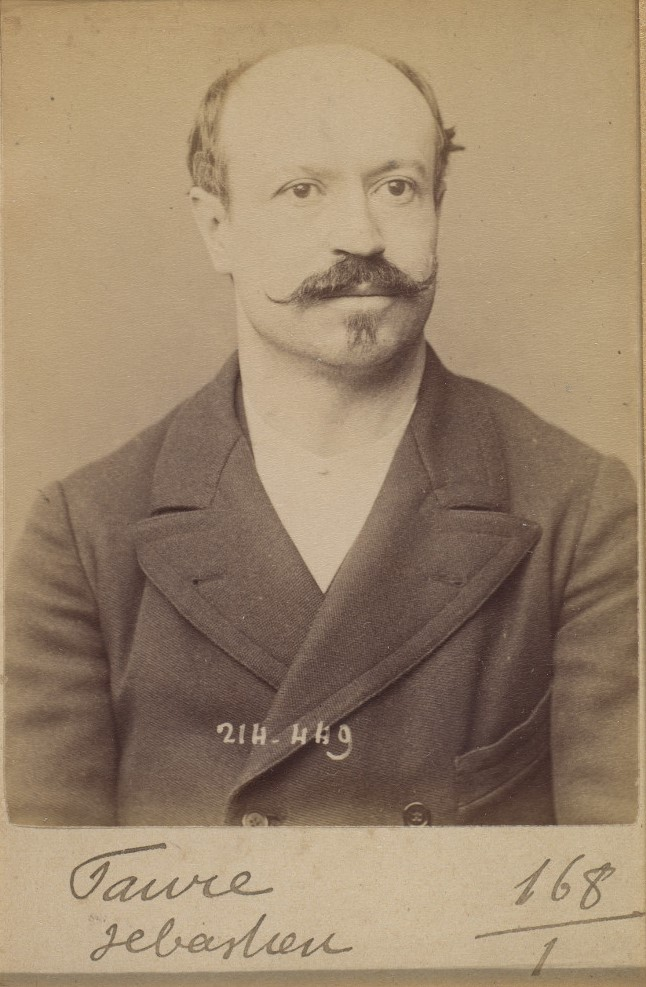
Sébastien Faure, one of the early proponents of the anarchist synthesis and a leading figure in the French anarchist movement.

In the autumn of 1927, at a congress of the French Anarchist Union, the platformist majority within the organisation overruled the synthesist minority. The French Synthesists, led by Sébastien Faure, split from the Union and established their own Federal Association of Anarchists (AFA). Faure himself desired to create a powerful organisation that could unite disparate revolutionary groupings and be capable of leading an insurrection. Although Faure had rejected the Platform as sectarian and ideologically homogeneous, preferring instead to cultivate good faith and mutual aid between anarchists, he set his own conception of synthesis apart from Volin's "dilettantism". In 1928, Sebastien Faure published The Anarchist Synthesis, arguing for looser organisational principles that allowed ideological diversity.

=== Formation of synthesis federations ===
In 1927, the Iberian Anarchist Federation (FAI) was established along synthesist lines, in order to act as a counterweight to the reformism expressed within the Confederación Nacional del Trabajo (CNT). In the wake of the FAI, synthesis federations were also formed in other countries, including the Francophone Anarchist Federation (FAF) in 1937 and the Italian Anarchist Federation (FAIt) in 1945. Following the defeat of imperial Japan, the Korean anarchist movement reorganised into the Federation of Free Society Builders (FFSB), which was formed along synthesist lines and continued to function in the South Korea until the October Restoration, when martial law was declared in the Republic of Korea.

In 1968, the International of Anarchist Federations (IAF) was established at a congress in Italy, building on the previously established international network at the initiative of the FAF. Established along synthesist lines, the IAF brought together anarchist federations from Argentina, Australia, Britain, Bulgaria, Cuba, France, Germany, Greece, Iberia, Italy, Japan, the Netherlands, Norway and Switzerland. The IAF affirmed its commitment to the principles of libertarian communism at its second congress in 1971, but soon lost its Cuban section due to its soft line on the Castro government. Nevertheless, the IAF managed to develop further links in Hong Kong and Vietnam and made contact with other anarchist federations in Europe and South America.

== Bibliography ==
- Avrich, Paul (1971) [1967]. The Russian Anarchists. Princeton: Princeton University Press. ISBN 0-691-00766-7. OCLC 1154930946.
- Baker, Zoe (2023). "Organizational Dualism: From Bakunin to the Platform". Means and Ends: The Revolutionary Practice of Anarchism in Europe and the United States. AK Press. pp. 307–346. ISBN 978-1-84935-498-1. OCLC 1345217229.
- Malet, Michael (1982). Nestor Makhno in the Russian Civil War. London: Palgrave Macmillan. ISBN 978-0-333-25969-6. OCLC 8514426.
- Schmidt, Michael (2013) [2012]. Cartography of Revolutionary Anarchism. Edinburgh: AK Press. ISBN 978-1849351386. OCLC 881111188.
- Skirda, Alexandre (2002). Facing the enemy: A history of anarchist organisation. Translated by Sharkey, Paul. Oakland: AK Press. ISBN 1902593197. OCLC 490977034.
- Skirda, Alexandre (2004) [1982]. Nestor Makhno–Anarchy's Cossack: The Struggle for Free Soviets in the Ukraine 1917–1921. Translated by Sharkey, Paul. Oakland: AK Press. ISBN 978-1-902593-68-5. OCLC 60602979.
- van der Walt, Lucien; Schmidt, Michael (2009). "Militant Minority: The Question of Anarchist Political Organisation". Black Flame: The Revolutionary Class Politics of Anarchism and Syndicalism. Edinburgh: AK Press. pp. 239–267. ISBN 978-1-904859-16-1. LCCN 2006933558. OCLC 1100238201.
