= Yakiv Sukhovolski =

Ukrainian anarcho-syndicalist (1880–1920)

- Яків Суховольський
- Born: 1880; Yelysavethrad, Kherson, Russian Empire
- Disappeared: September 1920 (aged 39–40); Millerovo, Ukrainian SSR
- Other names: Yakiv Alyi
- Occupation: Writer
- Years active: 1905–1920
- Organization: Nabat
- Movement: Makhnovshchyna
- Opponent: Bolsheviks

Yakiv Sukhovolski (Ukrainian: Яків Суховольський), also known by his nom de guerre Yakiv Alyi (Ukrainian: Яків Алий) (1880–1920) was a Ukrainian anarcho-syndicalist and writer. He was a member of the secretariat of the Nabat.

== Biography ==
Yakiv Sukhovolski was born in 1880 in Yelysavethrad, into a working-class Jewish family. During the 1905 Revolution, he joined anarchists and took the pseudonym Alyi (Scarlet). He served hard labour for his revolutionary activities, from which he returned following the 1917 Revolution.

Upon returning to Yelysavethrad, he established and led a group of anarcho-syndicalists. In November 1918, he participated in the creation of the Nabat Confederation of Anarchists of Ukraine and its newspaper, and was a permanent member of its Secretariat. In January–May 1919 he was an organizer of anarcho-syndicalist movement in Kharkiv, Katerynoslav and Kyiv. He was threatened with arrest after publishing anti-Bolshevik articles in the Nabat, in which he expressed:

"It's no secret to anyone that all the activities of the Bolshevik party are aimed solely at keeping power in their party's hands and not giving any other tendencies the chance to propagate their ideas [...] The commissars through their clumsiness and their imperious style have set the insurgents against the Bolsheviks and handed a trump card to the Black Hundreds [...] Only the clumsy and anti-revolutionary policies of the Bolsheviks could have given this opportunity to Hryhoriv and his company to exploit the dissatisfaction of the masses and lead them into these black, treacherous deeds.

— Nabat, No. 16, 26 May 1919

With other members of the Nabat, he joined the Revolutionary Insurgent Army of Ukraine (RIAU) and worked in the cultural section of Military Revolutionary Council (VRS). After the defeat of Anton Denikin and arrival of the Red Army in Ukraine, he returned to Kharkiv in January 1920. But after a short period of legal work, he went underground again with the outbreak of the Bolshevik-Makhnovist conflict. In April 1920, at an illegal conference of the Nabat, he was included in the Secretariat's official delegation and dispatched to re-establish communication with the RIAU. Together with other members of the delegation, Sukhovolski was arrested by the Cheka on charges of ties with Makhno, and after a 9-day hunger strike he was released. In the summer of 1920, he rejoined the Makhnovshchyna with other Nabat activists and worked in the movement's cultural-educational department. Along with the RIAU's chief of staff Viktor Bilash and fellow Nabat anarchist Aron Baron, Sukhovolski complained to the Revolutionary Insurgent Council about the conduct of the Kontrrazvedka, resulting in its restriction to military counter-intelligence and the formation of a new Commission for Anti-Makhnovist Activities.

In September 1920, Sukhovolski attended another illegal conference of the Nabat in Kharkiv. Aron Baron passed an anti-Makhnovist resolution at the conference, but he was opposed by a minority led by Sukhovolski and Yosif Gotman. The two subsequently formed a delegation to Huliaipole, where they intended to repair ties between the Nabat and the Makhnovshchyna, but they disappeared en route.

== See also ==
- List of people who disappeared

== Bibliography ==
- Danilov, V.P. (2006). Нестор Махно. Крестьянское движение на Украине. 1918–1921: Документы и материалы [Nestor Makhno. The Peasant Movement in Ukraine. 1918–1921: Documents and materials] (in Russian). Moscow: ROSSPEN. ISBN 9785824307696. OCLC 70989293.
- Malet, Michael (1982). Nestor Makhno in the Russian Civil War. London: Palgrave Macmillan. ISBN 978-0-333-25969-6. OCLC 8514426.
- Shubin, Aleksandr (2010). "The Makhnovist Movement and the National Question in the Ukraine, 1917–1921". In Hirsch, Steven J.; van der Walt, Lucien (eds.). Anarchism and Syndicalism in the Colonial and Postcolonial World, 1870–1940. Studies in Global Social History. Vol. 6. Leiden: Brill. pp. 147–191. ISBN 9789004188495. OCLC 868808983.
- Skirda, Alexandre (2004) [1982]. Nestor Makhno–Anarchy's Cossack: The Struggle for Free Soviets in the Ukraine 1917–1921. Translated by Sharkey, Paul. Oakland: AK Press. p. 317. ISBN 978-1-902593-68-5. OCLC 60602979.
