= Aron Baron =

Ukrainian anarchist (1891–1937)

- אהרן באראן
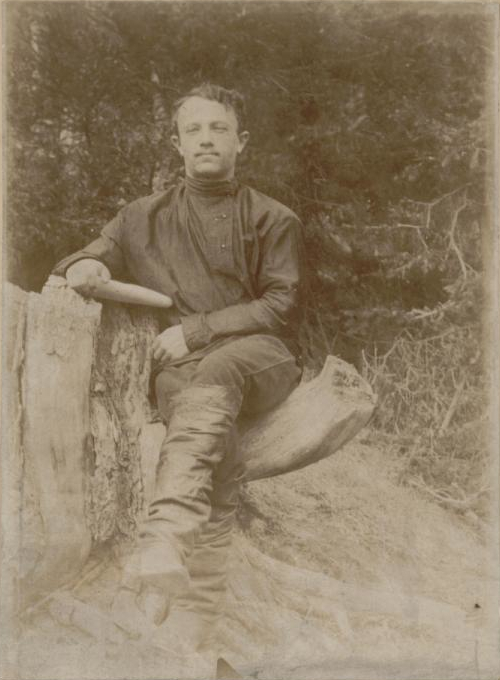
- Aron Baron (1911)
- Born: Aron Davydovych Baron; July 1, 1891; Hnylets, Kyiv, Russian Empire
- Died: August 12, 1937 (aged 46); Tobolsk, Tyumen, Russian SFSR, Soviet Union
- Cause of death: Execution by firing squad
- Other names: Aron Polevoy; Aron Faktorovich; Aron Kantorovich
- Occupations: Political activist; Baker
- Years active: 1905–1921
- Organization: Nabat
- Movement: Makhnovshchina
- Spouses: Fanya Baron, Fanya Avrutskaya
- Children: Theodore, Voltairine
- Parents: David Iosifovich Baron (father); Mindel Avigdorovna Baron, née Rabinovich (mother)
- Relatives: Mikhail Baron

Aron Davydovych Baron (Ukrainian: Аро́н Дави́дович Ба́рон; 1891–1937) was a Ukrainian Jewish anarchist revolutionary. Following the suppression of the 1905 Revolution, he fled to the United States, where he met his wife Fanya Baron and participated in the local workers movement. With the outbreak of the 1917 Revolution, he returned to Ukraine, where he became a leading figure in the Nabat and in the Makhnovshchina. He was imprisoned by the Cheka for his anarchist activities and was executed during the Great Purge.

== Biography ==
Aron Davydovych Baron was born into a Ukrainian Jewish family.

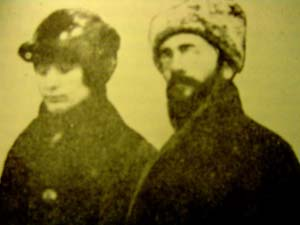
Aron and Fanya Baron in Russia

As a teenager, Baron became an anarchist and participated in the 1905 Russian Revolution, for which he was banished to Siberia as punishment. He fled to the United States, where he lived in Chicago. There he met and married Fanya Grefenson, also an anarchist revolutionary, and together they were arrested for starting a demonstration against unemployment. Following the February Revolution, Baron returned to Ukraine, where his lectures and writings grew in popularity and the Kyiv bakers' union elected him to represent them at the local Soviet. In the wake of the October Revolution, Baron moved to Kharkiv with Fanya, where they participated in the establishment of the Nabat, a confederation of anarchist organizations in Ukraine. He joined the confederation's secretariat and acted as co-editor of its journal, along with Volin.

By the summer of 1919, the Nabat had been forcibly dispersed by the Bolshevik government, which brought Baron and Volin to join the ranks of the Makhnovshchina, serving on its Cultural-Educational Commission and on the Military Revolutionary Council. At a Regional Congress, Baron spoke out against the Bolsheviks and declared the necessity to build a regime of free soviets, outside of party control. But before long, Baron had started to clash with Nestor Makhno and Dmitry Popov over the leadership of the movement, with the latter even threatening to have him killed. In July 1920, Baron, along with Viktor Bilash and Yakiv Sukhovolski, pushed for the abolition of the Makhnovist counterintelligence division. In September 1920, during an illegal conference of the Nabat in Kharkiv, Baron issued a resolution that was highly critical of the Makhnovshchina, declaring it "better to vanish into a Soviet prison than vegetate in that terrible atmosphere".

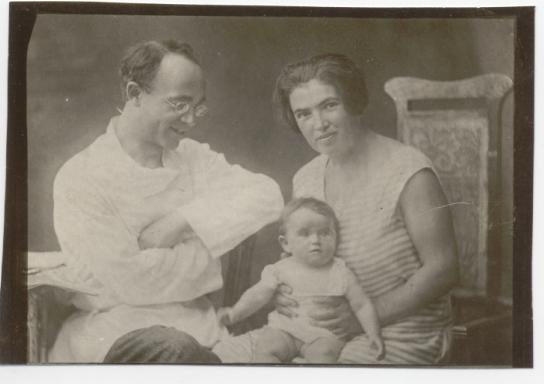
Aron Baron in exile with wife and daughter Voltairina

In November 1920, the leaders of the Nabat were arrested by the Cheka in Kharkiv, as part of Bolshevik operation against the Makhnovshchina. Aron and Fanya Baron were subsequently transferred to a prison in Moscow. In February 1921, Aron was briefly freed from prison in order to attend the funeral of Peter Kropotkin. In September 1921, Fanya was executed by the Cheka. Aron Baron spent the following 17 years in either prison or exile, before he was arrested and executed during the Great Purge. The fate of Aron's second wife Fanya Avrustkaya and their daughter Voltairina is unknown.

== Bibliography ==
- Avrich, Paul (1971) [1967]. The Russian Anarchists. Princeton: Princeton University Press. ISBN 0-691-00766-7. OCLC 1154930946.
- Azarov, Vyacheslav (2008). Kontrrazvedka - The Story of the Makhnovist Intelligence Service. Translated by Archibald, Malcolm. Edmonton: Black Cat Press. ISBN 978-0-9737827-2-1. OCLC 233786926.
- Darch, Colin (2020). Nestor Makhno and Rural Anarchism in Ukraine, 1917-1921. London: Pluto Press. ISBN 9781786805263. OCLC 1225942343.
- Malet, Michael (1982). Nestor Makhno in the Russian Civil War. London: Macmillan. ISBN 978-0-333-25969-6. OCLC 8514426.
- Patterson, Sean (2020). Makhno and Memory: Anarchist and Mennonite Narratives of Ukraine's Civil War, 1917–1921. Manitoba: University of Manitoba Press. ISBN 978-0-88755-578-7. OCLC 1134608930.
- Peters, Victor (1970). Nestor Makhno: The Life of an Anarchist. Winnipeg: Echo Books. OCLC 7925080.
- Skirda, Alexandre (2004). Nestor Makhno–Anarchy's Cossack: The Struggle for Free Soviets in the Ukraine 1917–1921. Translated by Sharkey, Paul. Oakland, CA: AK Press. ISBN 1-902593-68-5. OCLC 60602979.
