= Fanya Baron =

Russian anarchist (1887–1921)

- פאניה ברון
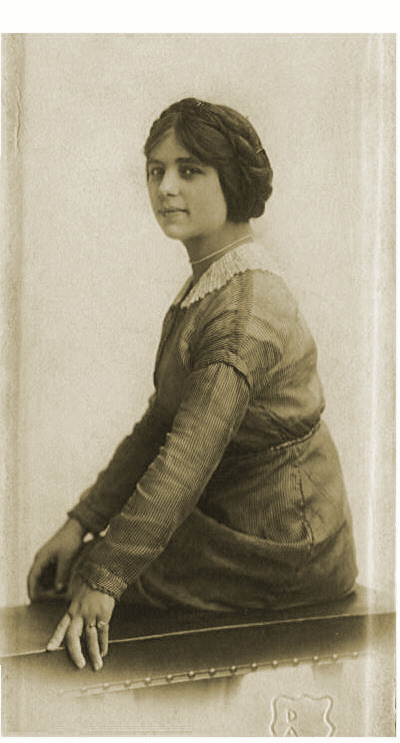
- Baron in pre-revolutionary Russia
- Born: Freida Anisimovna Greck; 1887; Vilnius, Russian Empire (now Lithuania)
- Died: 30 September 1921 (aged 33–34); Moscow, Russian Soviet Republic (now Russia)
- Cause of death: Execution by shooting
- Years active: 1915–1921
- Organization: Nabat
- Movement: Anarchism
- Criminal charges: Anti-Soviet agitation
- Criminal penalty: Capital punishment
- Spouse: Aron Baron
- Children: 1
- Parents: Nathan Grefenson (father); Chasse Plutzky (mother)

Fanya Anisimovna Baron (1887 – 30 September 1921) was a Russian Jewish anarchist revolutionary. She spent her early life participating in the Chicago workers' movement, but following the Russian Revolution in 1917, she moved to Ukraine and participated in the Makhnovist movement. For her anarchist activities, she was arrested and executed by the Cheka during the Red Terror.

== Biography ==
=== Growing up in the US ===
Born in 1887 as Freida Anisimovna Greck, Fanya at a young age moved with her family from the Russian Empire to the United States, where they took the name "Grefenson". In Chicago, she began a relationship with the exiled Russian anarchist Aron Baron, with whom she participated in the local workers' movement led by the Industrial Workers of the World (IWW). There she spent most of her time and money distributing anarchist propaganda in the factory that she worked in. During a workers' demonstration on 17 January 1915, Fanya was physically assaulted by police and arrested, but was bailed out by the American activist Jane Addams.

=== Moving back to Europe ===
With the outbreak of the February Revolution, Aron and Fanya Baron returned from their North American exile. They moved to Kyiv, in Ukraine, where they participated in the local workers' movement. In the wake of the October Revolution, the couple then moved to Kharkiv, where they participated in the establishment of the Nabat, a confederation of Ukrainian anarchists. Spurred to action by the political repression against the anarchist movement, she travelled throughout Ukraine to organise workers and peasants, provide prisoner aid and spread the influence of the Nabat. Baron herself was also a delegate to every one of the Nabat's congresses and conferences, both when they were legal and when they were held clandestinely.

The Nabat went on to join the Makhnovshchina and officially backed Nestor Makhno's Revolutionary Insurgent Army of Ukraine. Following the defeat of the White movement at the siege of Perekop in November 1920, the Bolsheviks turned on their anarchist allies, launching a surprise attack against them on several fronts. On 25 November 1920, members of the Nabat, including Aron and Fanya Baron, were arrested in Kharkiv and transferred to Russian prisons. In prison, Fanya was beaten by the guards and kept in squalid conditions.

=== Prison break ===
On 10 July 1921, Fanya joined a prison break launched by a cell of the Underground Anarchists. She managed to escape from Ryazan prison and went to Moscow, where she lived on the streets until her discovery by Emma Goldman and Alexander Berkman. With their aid, Fanya found refuge with her brother-in-law Semion Baron, a member of the Communist Party. She confided in Semion that she planned to break her husband out of prison, and he promised to help her, with Berkman reporting that she kept in high spirits as the preparations for the prison break went forward. But on 17 August 1921, she was discovered and arrested by the Cheka, before she was able to carry out her plans.

She joined her husband and a dozen other Russian anarchists in Taganka prison, at a time when the founding congress of the Profintern was underway. In an attempt to attract the attention of the foreign syndicalist delegates, the anarchists imprisoned at Taganka staged a hunger strike, which Fanya joined.

=== Persecution and execution ===
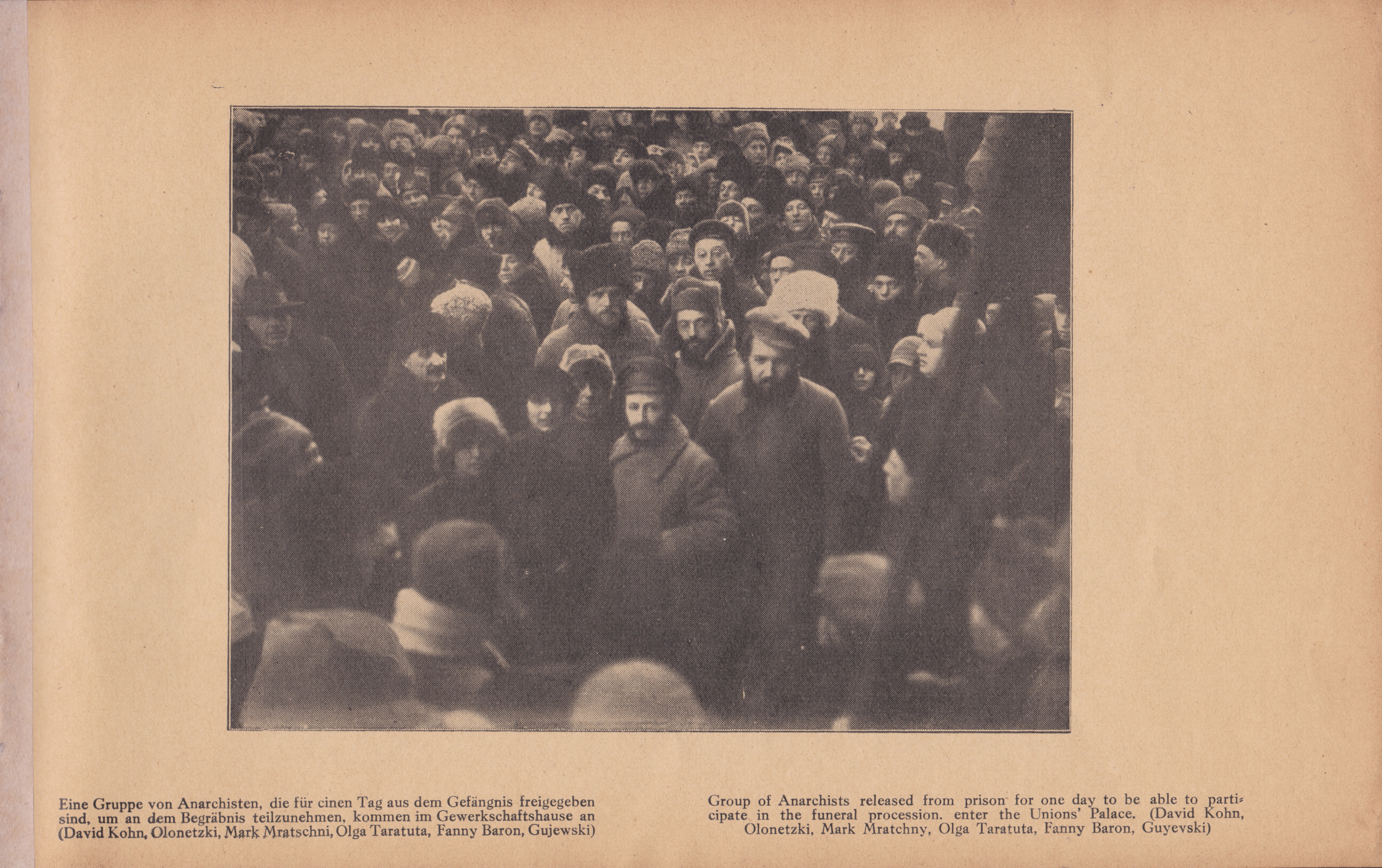
One of her last pictures, when she was freed by Soviet authorities one day to assist to Kropotkin's funerals. (collections of L'Éphéméride anarchiste)

Despite formal protests made to the Bolshevik leadership, the accusations of political repression were repeatedly denied by the authorities, with Leon Trotsky declaring "We do not imprison the real anarchists, but criminals and bandits who cover themselves by claiming to be anarchists." Sustained international and domestic pressure forced the government to relent, with Lenin ordering the release of anarchist political prisoners, on the condition they leave the country. On 17 September 1921, most of the anarchist prisoners were released and scheduled for deportation, but Fanya Baron and Lev Chernyi were kept behind bars. Baron herself was accused of a number of criminal acts, including counterfeiting of the Soviet ruble, banditry and terrorism. The Russian anarchist historian Volin denied the charges against Baron and Chernyi, claiming that the alleged counterfeiting had actually been committed by agents of the Cheka.

On the night of 29–30 September 1921, Fanya Baron was executed by the Cheka. According to Emma Goldman, she had resisted her fate until the last moment, having to be carried by Cheka officers to the spot of her execution. Goldman attempted to protest the execution, but was dissuaded by her friends and eventually left the country, thoroughly disillusioned with the Russian Revolution. After 18 years in prison, Aron Baron himself was executed during the Great Purge.

Over the years, Baron's death became symbolic of the Russian anarchists who fell victim to Soviet political repression. Decades after her execution, the Sydney-based Jura Books named its library after Fanya Baron.

== See also ==
- Peter Arshinov
- Okhrana

== Bibliography ==
=== Primary sources ===
- Berkman, Alexander (1925). "Last Links in the Chain". The Bolshevik Myth. New York City: Boni and Liveright. pp. 304–319. OCLC 1144036.
- Goldman, Emma (1924). "Persecution of Anarchists". My Further Dissillusionment in Russia. Garden City, New York: Doubleday, Page & Company. pp. 78–94. OCLC 1730716.
- Goldman, Emma (1934). "Chapter 52". Living My Life. Vol. 2. New York City: Garden City Publishing Company. pp. 899–927. OCLC 915230412.
- Serge, Victor (2012) [1951]. Memoirs of a Revolutionary. Translated by Sedgwick, Peter. New York Review Books. pp. 179, 453. ISBN 978-1-59017-451-7. LCCN 2011020475.
- Volin (1974) [1947]. "The Case of Leon Tchorny and Fanny Baron". The Unknown Revolution. Vol. 2. Translated by Cantine, Holley; Perlman, Fredy. Detroit: Black & Red. pp. 317–320. OCLC 491277858.

=== Secondary sources ===
- Ashbaugh, Carolyn (1986). "Radical Women: The Haymarket Tradition". In Roediger, Dave; Rosemont, Franklin (eds.). Haymarket Scrapbook. Chicago: Charles H. Kerr Publishing Company. pp. 177–178. ISBN 088286-1476. LCCN 86-080843.
- Avrich, Paul (1971) [1967]. "The Downfall of Russian Anarchism". The Russian Anarchists. Princeton: Princeton University Press. pp. 204–233. ISBN 0-691-00766-7. LCCN 66-25418. OCLC 14508600.
- Woodcock, George (2003) [1944]. "The Russian Revolution and the Makhnovist Movement". Socialism from Below: A History of Anarchism. Zabalaza Books. pp. 58–63.

=== Tertiary sources ===
- Dubovik, Anatoly (December 2004). "БАРОН Фаня Анисимовна". Российские социалисты и анархисты после Октября 1917 года (in Russian).
- Heath, Nick (6 July 2009). "Baron, Fanya aka Fanny Grefenson, aka Anisimovna aka Fanny Baron 1887-1921". Libcom.org.
- Meyer, Daniel (2007). "Fanya Baron - Jewish Anarchist/Revolutionary". J-Grit: The Internet Index of Tough Jews.
- R.D. (18 November 2006). "Baron, Fannya Anisimovna [née Grefenson]". Dictionnaire des militants anarchistes (in French). Archived from the original on 4 July 2022.
- Smele, Jonathan D. (2015). "Baron, Fania". Historical Dictionary of the Russian Civil Wars, 1916-1926. Rowman & Littlefield. p. 178. ISBN 978-1-4422-5281-3. LCCN 2015011566.
