= Free soviets =

Basic form of organization in the Makhnovshchina

Free soviets were the basic form of organization in the Makhnovshchina. These soviets acted independently from any central authority, excluding all political parties from participation, and met to self-manage the activities of workers and peasants through participatory democracy.

The soviets acted as the local organs of self-governance and federated together up to the regional and national levels, resulting in the relatively horizontal organization of the soviets. However, the conditions of the war meant that the soviet model could only be implemented at scale during "periods of relative peace and territorial stability", as the populace was largely concerned with securing food or staying safe from the advancing armies.

== History ==
After the Russian Revolution of 1917 brought the Bolsheviks to power in the country, a national congress of Russian anarcho-syndicalists called for the replacement of the Council of People's Commissars (CPC) with a decentralised system of "free soviets", which would be directly elected by peasants and industrial workers without the representation of any political parties. The anarcho-syndicalists believed these councils would serve as a transitionary period towards a stateless society. In October 1918, mutineers at Kronstadt issued a call for the replacement of the CPC with free soviets.

When Nestor Makhno first returned to his village of Huliaipole after the February Revolution, he immediately began agitating to establish a system of "free soviets". The Makhnovist capital of Huliaipole was soon at the center of the "free soviet" experiment, as the town "lived without any political authorities" between November 1918 and June 1919. The idea of "free soviets" became a point of lively debate during the Second Regional Congress, where one anarchist insurgent declared: "Whatever the cost, we must set up soviets which are beyond pressure from any and every party. Only non-party soviets of workers, freely elected are capable of affording us new liberties and rescuing the laboring people from enslavement and oppression. Long life to the freely elected, anti-authoritarian soviets!"

The system drew support from a number of different factions, particularly from Left Socialist-Revolutionaries such as Dmitry Popov, as well as Maximalists, non-partisans and even some dissident Bolsheviks. However, the system faced opposition from a number of other factions, with delegates to the Fourth Regional Congress from the Mensheviks and Right Socialist-Revolutionaries (both supporters of the Constituent Assembly) speaking out against a resolution which had called for "the universal and speediest possible creation of free local social and economic organizations in coordination with one another."

Following the victory of the Insurgent Army over the White movement in Ukraine, on 7 January 1920, they issued a declaration to Ukrainian workers and peasants, which proposed that they restart the construction of "free soviets" outside of political party control. They repealed both the legislation passed by Anton Denikin's Southern Russian government and by the Ukrainian Soviet Socialist Republic, transferred land to peasants and workplaces to their workers, and proclaimed the establishment of free soviets. They also proclaimed the establishment of freedom of assembly, freedom of the press and speech, as well as free exchange for the working class, while also taking a stance against any "counterrevolutionary" activity and establishing the death penalty for banditry. The Bolsheviks, who opposed any federation of "free soviets", responded the following day by launching an attack against the Makhnovshchina, liquidating insurgent positions around Huliaipole by the end of the month. In subsequent addresses, the Insurgents denounced the "communist hangmen" for breaking up the "free soviets", which had themselves been reconstituted after insurgent victories against the Whites, and called for Ukrainian workers and peasants to rise up against the Bolsheviks and reestablish a "regime of free soviets". The insurgents intensified their propaganda efforts in favor of "free soviets", even issuing a number of appeals to Red Army soldiers, in which they declared that their immediate goal was "to install a free soviet regime without the power of the Bolsheviks, without the predominance of any party." The Makhnovists eventually called for a "Third Revolution" against the one-party state, in an attempt to rally all supporters of "free soviets" to their banner.

In October 1920, a Military and Political Agreement between the Makhnovists and Bolsheviks was signed. However, the Fourth Clause of the Political Agreement was a point of contention, as it outlined that "[t]he local worker and peasant population, shall be free, in the area of operations of the Makhnovist Army, to organise free institutions of economic and political self-administration, as also their autonomous and federative links - by agreement with the State organs of the Soviet Republic." In the wake of the agreement, the "free soviets" were briefly revived in areas controlled by the Makhnovists. Throughout November, seven popular assemblies were convened in Huliaipole to discuss the issue, eventually resulting in the re-establishment of the Huliaipole Soviet on 16 November and the publication of the Fundamental Theses of the Free Toilers' Soviet, which laid out guidelines for establishing "free soviets". The Makhnovists did not renounce their territorial claims, with Makhno himself hoping they would establish an autonomous republic of free soviets in southeastern Ukraine. However, to the Bolsheviks, this system of "free soviets" presented a direct challenge to the "dictatorship of the proletariat". By 26 November, the Bolsheviks had broken the agreement and attacked the Makhnovshchina, definitively liquidating the "free soviet" system.

With the White movement decisively defeated and the Bolsheviks again attacking the Makhnovists, a string of anti-Bolshevik uprisings broke out, unanimously declaring themselves for the restoration of "free soviets". The Makhnovists also stepped up their propaganda efforts, circulating thousands of copies of their Draft Theoretical Declaration and the Statutes of the Free Soviets. The idea of "free soviets" permeated into the Kronstadt rebellion, which included a call for non-party soviets in the first point of its Petropavlovsk Resolution. However, these uprisings would all end in failure, with the Makhnovist insurgents themselves either being driven into exile, captured or killed.

== Analysis ==
Later anarchist analysis of the "free soviets" followed in the wake of Peter Arshinov's publication of his History of the Makhnovist Movement. Mark Mratchny regarded the role of "free soviets" in a "transitional period" as being closer to the ideology of the Left Socialist-Revolutionaries, who proposed a decentralized "informal State", than it was to anarchist theory. Anarchist critics of the "free soviets" considered them to resemble a form of state, which could have given way to bureaucracy or authoritarianism. These criticisms were rejected by Arshinov and Makhno, who claimed that the Makhnovshchina had "denied all statism" and ultimately "aspired to the building of a free society on the basis of the social independence, solidarity and self-direction of the toilers." Arshinov insisted that the "free soviets" were not "legislative institutions", but were rather "a sort of platform gathering together the toilers on the basis of their vital needs." He described their goal as being to resolve issues, reach agreements and carry out tasks given to them by the workers and peasants of a certain locality. These could include "provisions, self-defense, liaison between countryside and town, and many others."

According to Ukrainian historian Vyacheslav Azarov, the struggle for the free soviets should be seen as the foreground of the Makhnovist movement, rather than the background to its guerrilla warfare operations.

== See also ==
- Anarcho-communism
- Council communism
- Soviet (council)
- Workers' council

== Bibliography ==
- Avrich, Paul (1971) [1967]. The Russian Anarchists. Princeton: Princeton University Press. ISBN 0-691-00766-7. OCLC 1154930946.
- Darch, Colin (2020). Nestor Makhno and Rural Anarchism in Ukraine, 1917–21. London: Pluto Press. ISBN 978-0745338880. OCLC 1225942343.
- Malet, Michael (1982). Nestor Makhno in the Russian Civil War. London: Palgrave Macmillan. ISBN 0-333-25969-6. OCLC 1194667963.
- Skirda, Alexandre (2004) [1982]. Nestor Makhno: Anarchy's Cossack. Translated by Sharkey, Paul. Edinburgh: AK Press. ISBN 1-902593-68-5. OCLC 58872511.
