= Abram Budanov =

Ukrainian anarchist (1886–1929)

- Абрам Єфремович Буданов
- Born: 1886; Stary Krym, Mariupol, Katerynoslav, Russian Empire
- Died: 1929 (aged 42–43); Soviet Union
- Cause of death: Execution
- Military career
- Allegiance: Makhnovshchina
- Branch: Revolutionary Insurgent Army of Ukraine
- Service years: 1919–1922
- Conflicts: Ukrainian War of Independence

Abram Efremovich Budanov (Ukrainian: Абрам Єфремович Буданов ; sometimes spelled as Abraham; 1886–1929) was a Ukrainian anarchist military commander, as a member of the Makhnovist movement in Donbas and a permanent member of the RIAU's Military Revolutionary Council.

== Biography ==
Born in 1882 in the village of Stary Krym, in Mariupol, he also received four classes here.

He joined the anarcho-communists in 1905, took part in the Revolution of 1905–1907 in Luhansk. In 1917–1918, he was involved in organizing anarcho-syndicalist trade unions among Donbas miners, then he participated in the underground struggle against the Ukrainian State of Hetman Pavlo Skoropadsky.

In the spring of 1919 he joined the Makhnovist movement. In August 1919, he organized and led the Makhnovist uprising in units of the red 58th Division. On 1 September 1919, Abram was elected to the revolutionary military council of the RIAU in the village of Dobrovelichkovka.

In the RIAU he commanded the 1st Don Brigade, which was later transformed into a corps (1919), led the partisan struggle in Kharkov and Donetsk provinces (1920) and was a member of the Council of Revolutionary Insurgents of Ukraine.

On the evening of 23 February 1920, he arrived with the Makhnovists in Gavrilovka, Budanov called a meeting in the village and pasted leaflets with his own hand. At the end of 17–18 March, in the village of Bolshaya Yanisol, he conducted political and propaganda work. In Aleksandrovka, Budanov was elected to the cultural and educational department on 29 May, appointing him head of the department.

On 29 September 1920, the RIAU Council Diplomatic Commission was formed, which went to Kharkov to maintain contact with the Soviet government; Budanov was elected a member of the diplomatic mission.

He was arrested upon breaking the military-political agreement with the Bolshevik authorities on 26 November 1920, but in the summer of 1921 he escaped from the Ryazan prison and returned to Ukraine, leading the rebel movement until it was defeated in 1922 in Donbas.

By the end of 1928, he organized an underground anarchist group near Mariupol, which was discovered by the GPU of the Ukrainian SSR on 25 November 1928, and Budanov was sentenced to be shot.

In 1995 he was posthumously rehabilitated.

== See also ==
- Anarchism in Ukraine

== Bibliography ==
- Volin (1974) [1947]. The Unknown Revolution, 1917–1921. Translated by Holley Cantine; Fredy Perlman. New York: Free Life Editions. ISBN 9780914156062. OCLC 1130399.
- Belash, Alexander; Belash, Victor (1993). Дороги Нестора Махно (in Russian). Kyiv: РВЦ "Проза". ISBN 5770738146. OCLC 429142607.
