= Secretariat (administrative office) =

Focal administrative center of a regional or international/intergovernmental organization

The secretariat of an organization is the department that fulfils its central administrative or general secretary duties. The term is especially associated with governments and intergovernmental organizations such as the United Nations, although some non-governmental organizations (for example, the International Organization for Standardization) also refer to their administrative department as their secretariat. The building or office complex that houses such a department may also be referred to as its secretariat or secretariat building.

Most secretariats of international organizations operate on the principle of extra-territoriality which means the staff are not - in their workplace - governed by the laws of the countries in which they are situated. This means the staff are governed by the staff regulations and this situation plus the requirement of most international organizations that the secretariats are multi-national in composition creates bureaucratic and administrative problems.

In some cases, the secretariat is not a bureaucratic organ, but one which includes a certain organization run by all its members who collectively help to organize the larger group, such as the secretariat of the International of Anarchist Federations, which is an office that rotates irregularly between its member federations.

== See also ==
- Secretary
