= Alexandre Skirda =

French anarchist historian and translator (1942–2020)

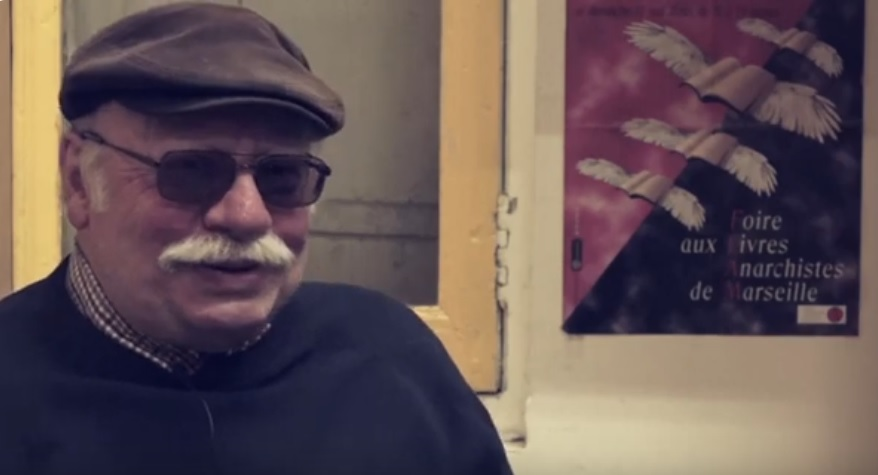
Alexandre Skirda

Alexandre Skirda (6 March 1942, Houdan – 23 December 2020, Paris) was a French historian and a translator, specializing in the Russian anarchist revolutionary movement. His mother was Ukrainian and his father was Russian. Knowing both languages, he grew up in France and wrote his work in French.

== Biography ==
Skirda became an anarchist as a teenager, through the influence of his friend Louis Louvet, the publisher of the periodical Contre-courant and distributor of texts published by Temps nouveaux. Through Louvet, Skirda was exposed to Bakunin, Kropotkin, Reclus and other classical anarchists.

He founded the Groupe d’Etudes et Action Anarchiste (Anarchist Studies and Action Group) with anarchist historian Roland Biard when they were both 19. He was active in demonstrating against France's war in Algeria.

From 1961, he studied at the Sorbonne, being taught History by the Stalinist Jean Bruhat, philosophy by Jean-Francois Lyotard (then a member of the libertarian communist Socialisme ou Barbarie group with Cornelius Castoriadis), industrial society by Raymond Aron and sociology by Georges Gurvitch (in particular, he was personally close to Lyotard and inspired by Gurvitch.) He worked during his student years, doing odd jobs in retail and other sectors, including as the main family breadwinner once his father died. After graduating with a Literature degree, in 1968 he became a civil servant, before participating in the revolutionary events of May 68 in Paris, including in student-worker action committees that synchronised student activism with factory occupations.

He joined the Union of Anarcho-Communist Groups (UGAC) and helped found the Libertarian Communist Movement (MCL). He left the MCL to join the Revolutionary Anarchist Organization (ORA), in which he used the pseudonym Brevan.

Skirda followed the platformist tendency in anarchism, which posits the need for strong organisation.

From the 1970s, he became increasingly involved in collecting and writing the history of anarchism, and from the 1980s he was a second-hand book dealer.

=== Movement historian ===
French sociologist René Lourau said in 1982 that "A solitary researcher, outside of an institution, Skirda has already given us, concerning the dark continent of the modern revolutionary movement (the USSR), some of the most striking studies and translations, although completely outside the 'gulagist' current". Skirda's work focused on the role of Russian and Ukrainian anarchists in the period of the 1917 Russian Revolution and its aftermath, and in particular on the Makhnovtchina (the Revolutionary Insurrectionary Army of Ukraine) and Krondstadt.

French historian Sylvain Boulouque called him a "weekend historian", saying that "Over the years [Skirda] made regular additions to his output, reprinted by one of his most loyal publishers, Éditions de Paris-Max Chaleil. In the 1970s, Soviet archives were accessible only to a handful of figures vetted by the Soviet party-state. Skirda was persona non grata in such circles. And so it was from Paris that he painstakingly assembled documentation from exiled activists and translated available materials from the Russian."

His Nestor Makhno — Anarchy’s Cossack: The Struggle for Free Soviets in the Ukraine 1917–1921, first published in French in 1982 followed by three more editions and English publication by AK Press in 2005, described the creation of free municipalities which aimed to establish a stateless society, and how these were crushed by the Bolshevik State. His Kronstadt 1921: Free Soviets Against Party Dictatorship told the story of the repression of the Kronstadt uprising by the Bolsheviks, including Leon Trotsky. He translated the previously unpublished Kronstadt in the Russian Revolution by Efim Yarchuk, one of the main organisers of the Kronstadt anarchists.

As a translator, he brought Polish libertarian essayist Jan Wacław Machajski (1866-1926) to the attention of francophone readers, publishing Makhaïski's Socialism of the Intellectuals, a Critique of the Capitalists of Learning.

Facing the Enemy: A History of Anarchist Organization is a history of European anarchism, based on decades of research, focused on the "core problem" of how "to create a revolutionary movement and envision a future society in which the autonomy of the individual is not compromised by the need to take collective action".

He recorded many oral histories of French activists and exiled Russian activists, co-authoring many movement memoirs, often working with Bernard Bastiat. Publications from this work included texts with Marcel Body, Swiss activist André Bösiger, and Makhnov associate Nicola Tchorbadieff.

== Works ==
=== Books in French ===
- Alexandre Skirda, Kronstadt 1921: prolétariat contre bolchévisme, Tête de feuille, Paris, 1971, 271 pp. (ISBN 2-84621-002-0)
- Alexandre Skirda, Les Anarchistes dans la Révolution russe, Tête de feuilles, Paris, 1973, 186 pp.
- Alexandre Skirda, Autonomie individuelle et force collective: les anarchistes et l’organisation de Proudhon à nos jours, Publico, Skirda, Spartacus, 1987, 365 pp. (ISBN 2-9502130-0-6)
- Alexandre Skirda, Nestor Makhno: le cosaque libertaire, 1888–1934; La Guerre civile en Ukraine, 1917–1921, Éd. de Paris, Paris, 1999, 491 pp. (ISBN 2-905291-87-7)
- Alexandre Skirda, Les Anarchistes russes, les soviets et la révolution de 1917, Éd. de Paris, Paris, 2000, 348 p. (ISBN 2-84621-002-0)
- Alexandre Skirda, Un plagiat “scientifique”: le copié-collé de Marx [‘Scientific’ Plagiarism: Marx’s Cut-and-Paste Job], Vétché, Paris, 2019, 237 pp.

=== Translations in English ===
- Nestor Makhno (edition by Alexandre Skirda and translation by Paul Sharkey), The Struggle Against The State And Other Essays, AK Press, 1 January 1996, 114 p. (ISBN 9781873176788)
- Alexandre Skirda (translation by Paul Sharkey), Facing the enemy: a history of anarchist organization from Proudhon to May 1968, AK Press, 1 January 2002, 292 p. (ISBN 9781902593197)
- Alexandre Skirda (translation by Paul Sharkey), Nestor Makhno: Anarchy's Cossack: The Struggle for Free Soviets in the Ukraine, AK Press, 2004, 415 p. (ISBN 9781902593685)

== See also ==
- History of anarchism
- Anarchism in France
- Anarchism in Ukraine
- Volin – Russian anarchist and historian of anarchism (1882–1945)
- The Unknown Revolution – 1947 anarchist history of the Russian revolution
- Anti-Stalinist left
