= List of Jewish anarchists =

This is a list of Jewish anarchists.

== Individuals ==
=== A ===
- Paul Avrich

=== B ===
- Aron Baron
- Fanya Baron
- Julian Beck
- Alexander Berkman
- Walter Block
- Abe Bluestein
- Mykel Board
- Dmitry Bogrov
- Murray Bookchin

=== C ===
- Noam Chomsky
- Joseph J. Cohen

=== D ===
- Nellie Dick
- Sam Dolgoff

=== E ===
- David Edelstadt
- Carl Einstein

=== F ===
- Leah Feldman
- Senya Fleshin
- David D. Friedman
- Abraham Frumkin

=== G ===
- Mécislas Golberg
- Emma Goldman
- Marie Goldsmith
- Paul Goodman
- Abba Gordin
- Wolf Gordin
- Uri Gordon
- Yosif Gotman
- David Graeber
- Philip Grosser

=== H ===
- Paul Hefeld
- Abbie Hoffman
- Johannes Holzmann (Senna Hoy)

=== K ===
- Moshe Katz
- Tuli Kupferberg

=== L ===
- Charles Lahr
- Gustav Landauer
- Bernard Lazare
- Jacob Lapidus
- Philip Levine
- Roman Lewis

=== M ===
- Michael Malice
- J. A. Maryson
- Albert Meltzer
- Ida Mett
- Helene Minkin
- Mark Mratchny
- Erich Mühsam

=== P ===
- Rose Pesotta
- Jonathan Pollak

=== R ===
- Simón Radowitzky
- Maksim Rayevsky
- Murray Rothbard
- David Rovics

=== S ===
- Alexander Schapiro
- Sascha Schapiro
- Sholom Schwartzbard
- Karl Shapiro
- Daniel Sieradski
- Toma Sik
- Hillel Solotaroff
- Mollie Steimer
- Modest Stein

=== T ===
- Olga Taratuta
- Ahrne Thorne
- Moishe Tokar
- Yosef Trumpeldor
- Kevin Tucker (anarchist)

=== V ===
- Volin

=== W ===
- Rose Witcop
- Milly Witkop

=== Y ===
- Saul Yanovsky

=== Z ===
- Yankev-Meyer Zalkind
- Howard Zinn

== See also ==
- Jewish anarchism
