= Moshe Katz (editor, born 1864) =

American editor (1864–1941)

- Born: 1864
- Died: 1941 (aged 76–77)
- Other names: Moishe, Moyshe

Moshe Katz (1864–1941) was an American Jewish editor and activist. He was a central figure of New York City's Jewish anarchist circle at the turn of the century, participating with the Pioneers of Liberty and giving speeches. He briefly edited the Yiddish-language anarchist newspaper Fraye Arbeter Shtime in the 1890s and contributed to other Yiddish-language periodicals. Katz translated multiple anarchist classics into Yiddish: Conquest of Bread, Moribund Society and Anarchy, and Prison Memoirs of an Anarchist. He grew towards Labor Zionism after the 1903 anti-Jewish Kishinev pogrom and eventually moved to Philadelphia to launch and edit a Yiddish daily periodical, Di Yiddishe velt (The Jewish World), for twenty years beginning in 1914. Katz brought his New York literary contacts to the Philadelphia paper with content that rivaled the Yiddish periodicals of New York.

== Biography ==
Moshe Katz was born in 1864. He was a prominent member of New York City's Pioneers of Liberty, the country's first Jewish anarchist group. He was also a founding member of Fraye Arbeter Shtime in the early 1890s. Katz participated in the selection of its first editor and a fundraising lecture tour. His own lectures were well attended. As a well-known Jewish anarchist, Katz was invited to lecture at the Philadelphia Knights of Liberty's Sunday anarchist forums and at the 1891 Yom Kippur ball in New York. After David Edelstadt died in 1892, Katz and Hillel Solotaroff edited the Fraye Arbeter Shtime.

Katz served on the editorial board of the original Yiddish-language American anarchist periodical Varhayt (Truth), which lasted less than a year. He was literary editor of the socialist weekly Der Vorwarts and contributed to Di Fraye Gezelshaft, a Yiddish monthly cultural journal filling a hiatus for Fraye Arbeter Shtime in the mid-1890s. Katz was the treasurer of New York's Union of Jewish Newspaper Writers, founded in 1902. He translated multiple anarchist books into Yiddish: Peter Kropotkin's Conquest of Bread (1906), Jean Grave's Moribund Society and Anarchy (1894), and Alexander Berkman's Prison Memoirs of an Anarchist (1920 and 1921, in two volumes). The Kropotkin and Berkman translations were done with Abraham Frumkin.

Katz turned towards Labor Zionism after the 1903 anti-Jewish Kishinev pogrom. Historian Murray Friedman wrote that Katz left behind his philosophical anarchism for Zionism, as he moved towards nationalism and conservative, nonpartisan views. Katz was brought to Philadelphia to establish a strong Yiddish publication to rival those of New York. He edited Di Yiddishe velt (The Jewish World), a daily newspaper, beginning in February 1914. As one of few prominent New York Jews to relocate to Philadelphia, he brought relationships from the literary and journalistic worlds that brought a variety of original writing from luminaries such as such as the writer Shmuel Niger and the poet Morris Rosenfeld. Di Yiddishe velt was a formidable peer to the New York Yiddish periodicals and Katz was honored locally as a "captain of the literary pen". Unlike the New York Yiddish periodicals, Di Yiddishe velt did not have an ideological bent and was meant to appeal to Yiddish readers broadly. It covered aspects of Philadelphia's Jewish immigrant society that were not covered elsewhere.

After the Russian Revolution, Katz traveled to Russia and Ukraine to see how Jews were living. His traveling companion, Israel Friedlander, was murdered and Katz too barely escaped Ukrainian pogromists. Returning to Philadelphia, he continued to edit Di Yiddishe velt through 1934, when he was replaced as editor. Though the paper survived the Great Depression, it closed in 1941, the year that Katz himself died.

== Translations ==
- דיא אנארכיטסטישע געזעלשאפט (1894 Yiddish translation of Jean Grave's Moribund Society and Anarchy) OCLC 746575167
- ברויט און פרייהייט (1906 Yiddish translation of Peter Kropotkin's Conquest of Bread) OCLC 23421258
- געפענגיס־עראינערונגען פון אן אנארכיסט (1920-1921 Yiddish translation of Alexander Berkman's Prison Memoirs of an Anarchist) OCLC 19303446

== Bibliography ==
- Avrich, Paul (1988). "Jewish Anarchism in the United States". Anarchist Portraits. Princeton, N.J.: Princeton University Press. pp. 176–199. ISBN 978-0-691-04753-9. OCLC 17727270.
- Falk, Candace, ed. (2008). Emma Goldman: A Documentary History of the American Years, Vol. 2: Making Speech Free, 1902–1909. University of Illinois Press. pp. 529–530. ISBN 978-0-252-07543-8.
- Friedman, Murray (1983). Jewish Life in Philadelphia, 1830-1940. Institute for the Study of Human Issues. pp. 86–87. ISBN 978-0-89727-050-2.
- Weinstein, Bernard; Wolfthal, Maurice (2018). "The Jewish Unions in America: Pages of History and Memories". The Jewish Unions in America. Pages of History and Memories. Open Book Publishers. pp. 13–316. ISBN 978-1-78374-353-7. JSTOR j.ctv8j3sm.5.
