= J. A. Maryson =

American anarchist, physician, translator, and essayist (1866–1941)

- Born: 1866
- Died: 1941 (aged 74–75)
- Other name: Y. A. Merison
- Occupations: Physician, translator

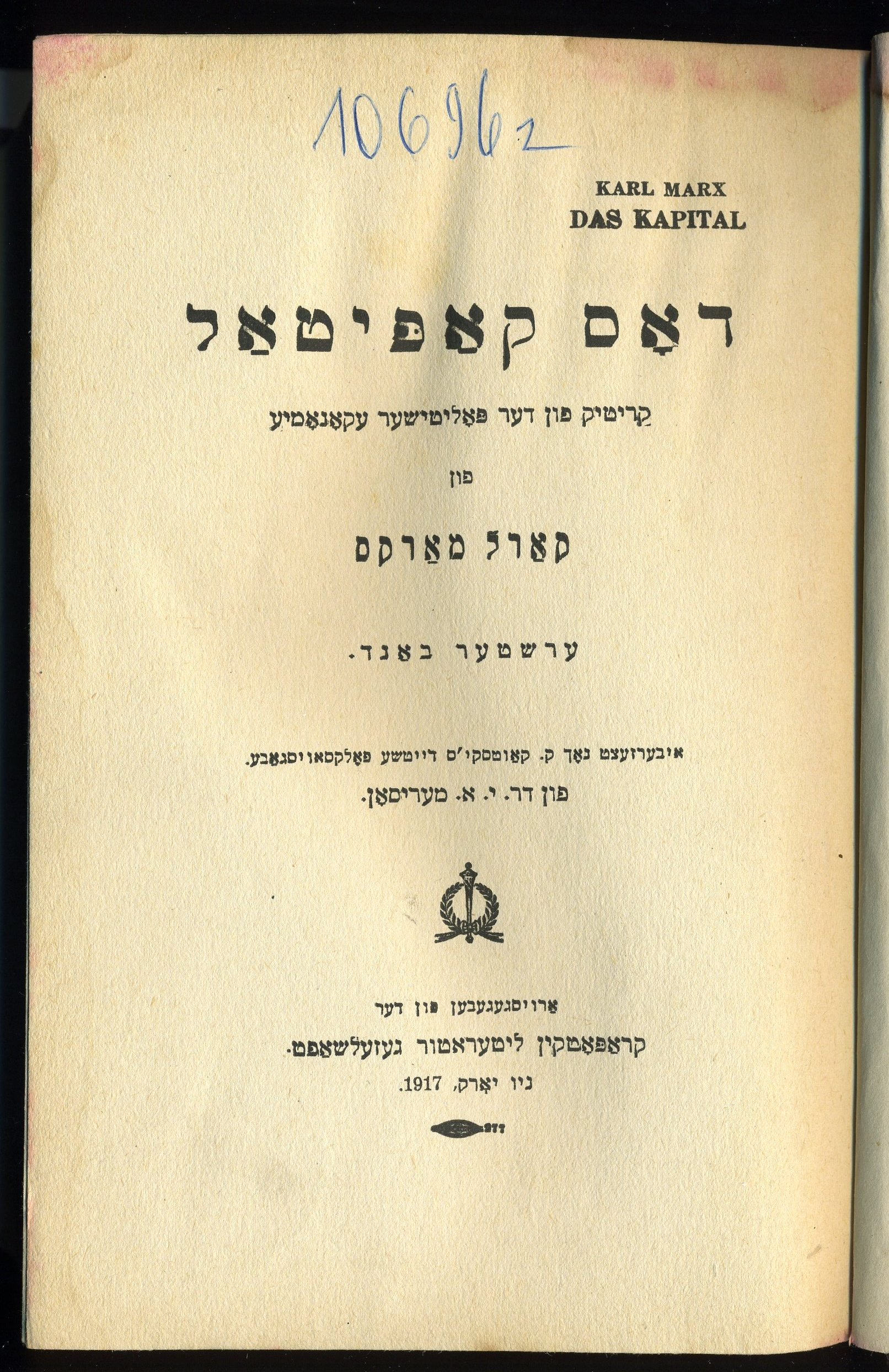
Maryson's Yiddish translation of Das Kapital

Jacob Abraham Maryson (1866–1941) was a Jewish–American anarchist, doctor, essayist and Yiddish translator. Maryson was among the few Pioneers of Liberty who could write in English. He was among the Pioneers who launched the Varhayt in 1889, the first American anarchist periodical in Yiddish.

== Career ==
Maryson was the second editor of the Yiddish anarchist newspaper Fraye Arbeter Shtime in 1890, following Roman Lewis. He briefly returned to the editorship for a few months following Saul Yanovsky three decades later, but only lasted a few months after refusing to publish a pro-Communist article. Yanovsky had developed an opposition among anarchists for his disavowal of Leon Czolgosz's assassination of William McKinley, Maryson was among his detractors despite being more politically moderate than Yanovsky. In 1906, he advocated for anarchists to join in electoral politics to encourage governmental decentralization and counteract state socialism. Maryson sidestepped the Jewish radical community's debate over whether to endorse an autonomous, Jewish, socialist, self-governing territory.

Maryson contributed to a variety of other Yiddish publications and became known as "the Kropotkin of the Jewish anarchist movement". During Fraye Arbeter Shtime's hiatus in the late 1890s, Maryson assisted in the cultural and literary journal Di Fraye Gezelshaft. Beginning in 1911, he edited the anarchist periodical Dos Fraye Vort. Maryson organized the Kropotkin Literary Society to print Yiddish translations of European thinkers. Maryson handled some of the group's most challenging translations, including Marx's Das Kapital, Stirner's The Ego and His Own, and Thoreau's Civil Disobedience. He also translated John Stuart Mill's On Liberty. Maryson later wrote The Principles of Anarchism in 1935.

He married the intellectual and doctor Katherina Yevzerov, who became known for her writings on "the woman question" in the Yiddish radical press and on women's suffrage.

== Works ==
- The Principles of Anarchism (1934, trans. 1935)
- Physiology (1918–1925; four volumes, in Yiddish) OCLC 32119919
- Mother and Child: Practical Advice for Mothers on How to Take Care of Themselves During Pregnancy and How to Rear Children (1912, in Yiddish)
- Anarchism and Political Activity (1907)

== Bibliography ==
- Avrich, Paul (1988). "Jewish Anarchism in the United States". Anarchist Portraits. Princeton, N.J.: Princeton University Press. ISBN 0-691-04753-7. OCLC 17727270.
- Zimmer, Kenyon (2015). Immigrants against the State: Yiddish and Italian Anarchism in America. University of Illinois Press. ISBN 978-0-252-09743-0.
