= Katherina Yevzerov =

Russian-American gynecologist, anthropologist and activist

- קאַטערינאַ עווזעראָוו
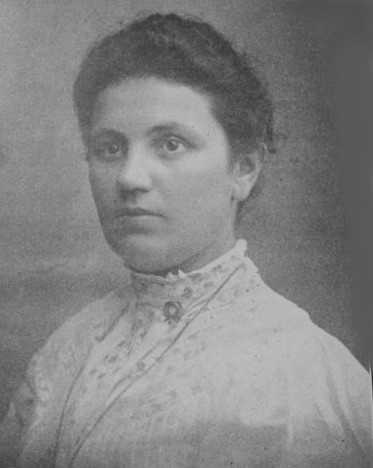
- Born: 1870; Nevel, Vitebsk, Russian Empire
- Died: 20th century
- Occupations: Gynecologist, anthropologist, journalist

Katherina Yevzerov Merison (b. 1870) was a Russian-American gynecologist, anthropologist and anarcha-feminist activist.

== Biography ==
Katherina Yevzerov was born in 1870, in the small town of Nevel, in the Vitebsk Governorate of the Russian Empire. She received a religious education, learning how to read and speak the Aramaic and Hebrew languages by the age of 10. During her studies, she also encountered the writings of the Russian nihilist movement. According to archivist Moshe Goncharok, Isaac Bashevis Singer's short story "Yentl the Yeshiva Boy" was inspired by Yevzerov's early life in religious education.

In 1888, Yevzerov emigrated to the United States with her family. She enrolled at New York University, where she studied medicine and graduated with her medical degree in 1893. Soon after, she married the anarchist physician J. A. Maryson.

Yevzerov herself became an anarchist and found work as a gynecologist. She frequently wrote for the Yiddish anarchist press, penning a series of articles on "the woman question" for the Pioneers of Liberty. Yevzerov supported women's suffrage, arguing that if socialism could not be instituted immediately, then it should be gradually constructed. Her views on the matter were criticised by the anarchists of Fraye Arbeter Shtime, who denounced her for "revisionism". Together with her husband and other Jewish anarchist intellectuals such as Abraham Frumkin, Hillel Solotaroff and Saul Yanovsky, she also contributed to non-aligned Yiddish publications like The Forward.

In 1900, Yevzerov wrote a series of articles on feminist anthropology which she published in Di Fraye Gezelshaft. Drawing from the anthropological work of Lewis H. Morgan, Yevzerov emphasized the differences in gender roles in different cultures and societies. She constructed a general women's history that surveyed several historical matriarchal societies, including those of Aboriginal Australians, the Sultanate of Women in the Ottoman Empire, and those of women in ancient Greece. She thus refuted the claim that gender roles were something innate to human nature, and argued for recognition of women's rights and the institution of gender equality. In 1907, she collected these articles together and published them in the book Di froy in der gezelshaft (English: Women in Society). The book was published by the Zsherminal Group, in the midst of a rent strike by the Jewish community in Harlem.

== Legacy ==
Yevzerov gained widespread recognition for her writings and political activism, as she was one of the few notable women in the Jewish anarchist movement. But unlike Sarah Edelstadt, Emma Goldman and Anna Netter, who largely agitated in the English language, Yevzerov's works were mostly in Yiddish. As of 2023, Yevzerov's Yiddish works have not yet been translated into English.

== Bibliography ==
- Baker, Zoe (2023). Means and Ends: The Revolutionary Practice of Anarchism in Europe and the United States. AK Press. ISBN 978-1-84935-498-1.
- Torres, Anna Elena (2020). "The Horizon Blossoms and the Borders Vanish: Peretz Markish's Poetry and Anarchist Diasporism". The Jewish Quarterly Review. 110 (3): 458–490. JSTOR 27102804.
- Torres, Anna Elena; Zimmer, Kenyon, eds. (2023). With Freedom in Our Ears: Histories of Jewish Anarchism. University of Illinois Press. ISBN 9780252054280.
- Torres, Anna Elena (2024). ""Anarchism by Our Grandmothers": Feminist Genealogies". Horizons Blossom, Borders Vanish: Anarchism and Yiddish Literature. Yale University Press. pp. 101–132. doi:10.2307/jj.10329838.7. ISBN 978-0-300-24356-7. JSTOR jj.10329838.7.
- Zimmer, Kenyon (2015). Immigrants Against the State: Yiddish and Italian Anarchism in America. University of Illinois Press. ISBN 978-0-252-03938-6.
- Zimmer, Kenyon (2017). "Saul Yanovsky and Yiddish Anarchism on the Lower East Side". In Goyens, Tom (ed.). Radical Gotham: Anarchism in New York City from Schwab's Saloon to Occupy Wall Street. University of Illinois Press. ISBN 9780252099595.
