= Vakht Oyf =

Yiddish socialist song

Vakht Oyf (Yiddish: וואַכט אויף, lit. 'wake up'), or Vi lang, o vi lang (Yiddish: ווי לאַנג ,אָ ווי לאַנג, lit. 'How long, oh how long'), is a Yiddish-language song associated with the Bundist and Jewish Anarchist movements written by David Edelstadt. The song is featured in the film Free Voice of Labor: The Jewish Anarchists.

== Recordings ==
- Soundtrack to Free Voice of Labor: The Jewish Anarchists, arr. Zalmen Mlotek with unknown, 1980
- "אַפיקורסים Apikorsim (Heretics)", The Klezmatics, 2016

== Lyrics ==
Yiddish	Transliteration	English
ווי לאַנג ,אָ ווי לאַנג וועט איר בלײַבן נאָך שקלאַפֿן	Vi lang, o vi lang vet ir blaybn nokh shklafn	How long, oh how long will you remain slaves
?און טראָגן די שענדלעכע קייט	Un trogn di shendlekhe keyt?	And carry these shameful chains
ווי לאַנג וועט איר גלענצענדע רײַכטימער שאַפֿן	Vi lang vet ir glentsnde raykhtimer shafn	How long will you create splendid riches
?פֿאַר דעם ,וואָס באַרויבט אײַער ברויט	Far dem, vos baroybt ayer broyt?	For he who robs your bread?
ווי לאַנג וועט איר שטיין ,אײַער רוקן געבויגן	Vi lang vet ir shteyn, ayer rukn geboygn,	How long will you stand with your back bent
?דערנידריקט ,היימלאָז ,פֿאַרשמאַכט	Derniderikt, heymloz, farshmakht?	Humiliated, homeless, prostrate,
!עס טאָגט שוין! וואַכט אויף! עפֿנט אײַערע אויגן	Es togt shoyn, vakht oyf un tseefnt di oygn!	It's dawn already, wake up and open your eyes
!דערקענט אײַער אײַזערנע מאַכט	Derfilt ayer ayzerne makht!	Feel your iron strength
!קלינגט אומעטום אין די פֿרײַהייטס־גלאָקן	Klingt umetum in di frayheyts-glokn!	Ring everywhere the freedom bells
!פֿאַרזאַמלט די לײַדענדע קנעכט	Farzamlt di laydnde knekht!	Convene the suffering slaves
און קעמפֿט באַגײַסטערט ,און קעמפֿט אומדערשראָקן	Un kemft bagaystert, un kemft undershrokn,	And fight inspired, fight fearlessly
!פֿאַר אײַערע הייליקע רעכט	Far ayere heylike rekht!	For your holy rights
און אַלעס וועט לעבן און ליבן און בליִען	Un ales vet lebn, un libn, un blien,	And everything will live, love, and bloom
!אין פֿרײַען ,אין גאָלדענעם מײַ	in frayen, in goldenem may!	In the free and golden may
ברידער! גענוג פֿאַר טיראַנען צו קניִען	Brider! genug far tiranen tsu knien	Brothers! Enough kneeling for the tyrants
!שווערט ,אַז איר מוזט ווערן פֿרײַ	Shvert, az ir muzt vern fray!	Swear that you'll become free!
