= Anarchism and religion =

Anarchists have traditionally been skeptical of or vehemently opposed to organized religion. Nevertheless, some anarchists have provided religious interpretations and approaches to anarchism, including the idea that the glorification of the state is a form of sinful idolatry.

== Anarcho-atheism ==
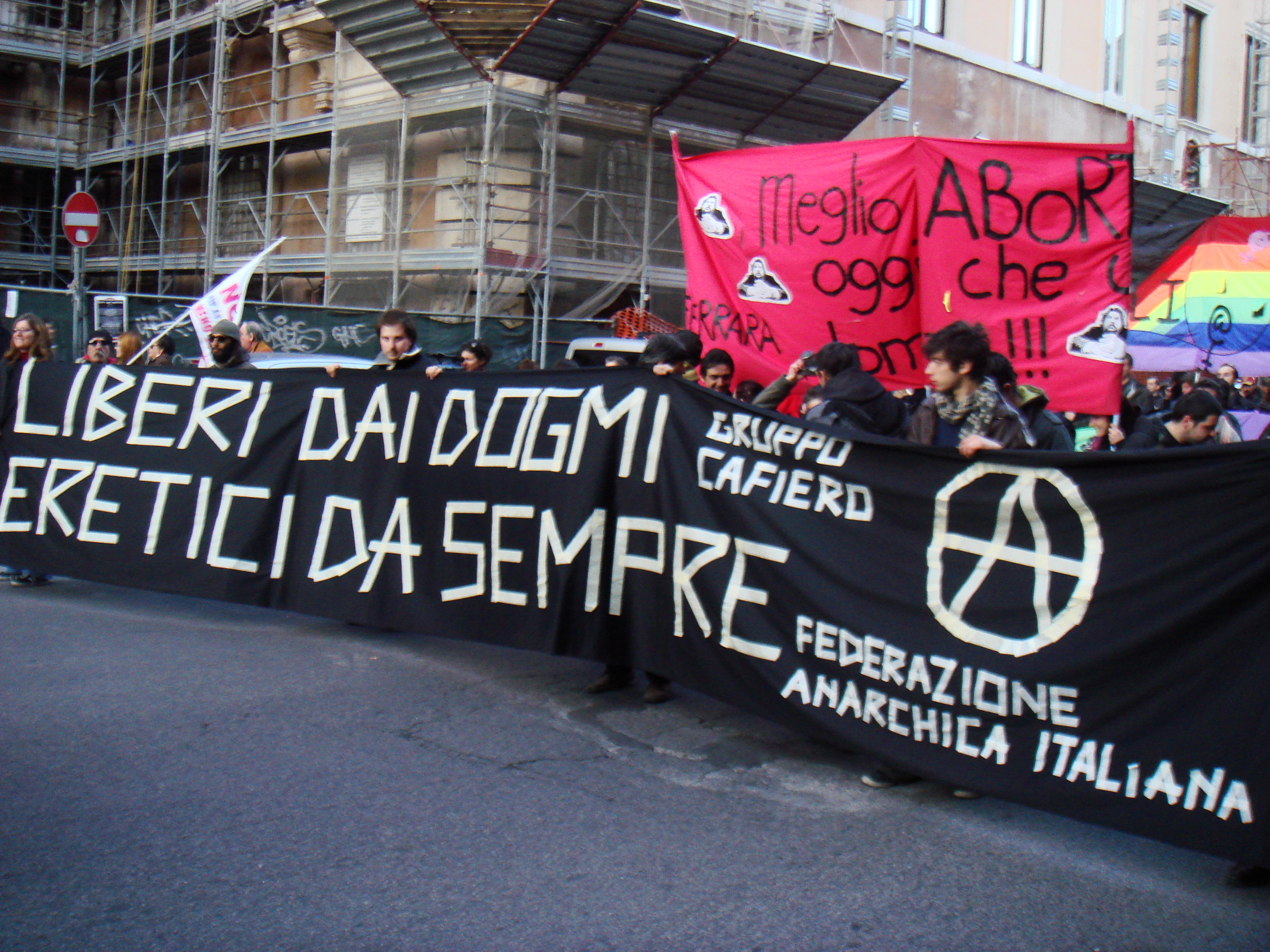
Members of the Italian Anarchist Federation marching in an anticlerical demonstration as the banner reads "Free from dogmas, always heretics"

Anarchists "are generally non-religious and are frequently anti-religious, and the standard anarchist slogan is the phrase coined by a non-anarchist, the socialist Auguste Blanqui in 1880: ‘Ni Dieu ni maître!’ (Neither God nor master!). The argument for a negative connection is that religion supports politics, the Church supports the State, opponents of political authority also oppose religious authority".

William Godwin, "the author of the Enquiry Concerning Political Justice (1793), the first systematic text of libertarian politics, was a Calvinist minister who began by rejecting Christianity, and passed through deism to atheism and then what was later called agnosticism." The pioneering German individualist anarchist Max Stirner, "began as a left-Hegelian, post-Feuerbachian atheist, rejecting the ‘spirit’ (Geist) of religion as well as of politics including the spook of ‘humanity’". Pierre-Joseph Proudhon, "the first person to call himself an anarchist, who was well known for saying, ‘Property is theft’, also said, ‘God is evil’ and ‘God is the eternal X’".

Published posthumously in French in 1882, Mikhail Bakunin's God and the State was one of the first anarchist treatises on religion. Bakunin became an atheist while in Italy in the 1860s. He was briefly involved with freemasonry, which influenced him in this. When he established the International Revolutionary Association, he did so with former supporters of Mazzini, who broke with him over his deism. It was in this period that Bakunin wrote: "God exists, therefore man is a slave. Man is free, therefore there is no God. Escape this dilemma who can!" which appeared in his unpublished Catechism of a freemason. Bakunin expounds his philosophy on religion's place in history and its relationship to the modern political state. It was later published in English by Mother Earth Publications in 1916. Anarcho-communism's main theorist Peter Kropotkin "was a child of the Enlightenment and the Scientific Revolution, and assumed that religion would be replaced by science and that the Church as well as the State would be abolished; he was particularly concerned with the development of a secular system of ethics which replaced supernatural theology with natural biology".

Errico Malatesta and Carlo Cafiero, "the main founders of the Italian anarchist movement, both came from freethinking families (and Cafiero was involved with the National Secular Society when he visited London during the 1870s)". In the French anarchist movement, Elisée Reclus was the son of a Calvinist minister and began by rejecting religion before moving on to anarchism. Sébastien Faure, "the most active speaker and writer in the French movement for half a century" wrote an essay titled Twelve Proofs of God's Inexistence. German insurrectionary anarchist Johann Most wrote an article called "The God Pestilence".

In the United States, "freethought was a basically anti-Christian, anti-clerical movement, whose purpose was to make the individual politically and spiritually free to decide for himself on religious matters. A number of contributors to Liberty were prominent figures in both freethought and anarchism. The individualist anarchist George E. MacDonald was a co-editor of Freethought and, for a time, The Truth Seeker. E.C. Walker was co-editor of the excellent free-thought / free love journal Lucifer, the Light-Bearer". "Many of the anarchists were ardent freethinkers; reprints from freethought papers such as Lucifer, the Light-Bearer, Freethought and The Truth Seeker appeared in Liberty...The church was viewed as a common ally of the state and as a repressive force in and of itself". Late 19th century/early 20th century anarchists such as Voltairine de Cleyre were often associated with the freethinkers' movement, advocating atheism.

In Europe, a similar development occurred in French and Spanish individualist anarchist circles. "Anticlericalism, just as in the rest of the libertarian movement, in another of the frequent elements which will gain relevance related to the measure in which the (French) Republic begins to have conflicts with the church...Anti-clerical discourse, frequently called for by the French individualist André Lorulot, will have its impacts in Estudios (a Spanish individualist anarchist publication). There will be an attack on institutionalized religion for the responsibility that it had in the past on negative developments, for its irrationality which makes it a counterpoint of philosophical and scientific progress. There will be a criticism of proselytism and ideological manipulation which happens on both believers and agnostics.". This tendency continued in French individualist anarchism in the work and activism of Charles-Auguste Bontemps and others. In the Spanish individualist anarchist magazine Ética and Iniciales "there is a strong interest in publishing scientific news, usually linked to a certain atheist and anti-theist obsession, philosophy which will also work for pointing out the incompatibility between science and religion, faith and reason. In this way there will be a lot of talk on Darwin´s theories or on the negation of the existence of the soul." Spanish anarchists in the early 20th century were responsible for burning several churches, though many of the church burnings were carried out by members of the Radical Republican Party, while anarchists were blamed. Church leaders' implicit or explicit support for the Nationalist Faction during the Spanish Civil War greatly contributed to the anti-religious sentiment.

In Anarchism: What It Really Stands For, Emma Goldman wrote:

Anarchism has declared war on the pernicious influences which have so far prevented the harmonious blending of individual and social instincts, the individual and society. Religion, the dominion of the human mind; Property, the dominion of human needs; and Government, the dominion of human conduct, represent the stronghold of man's enslavement and all the horrors it entails.

Chinese anarchists led the opposition to Christianity in the early 20th century, but the most prominent of them, Li Shizeng, made it clear that he opposed not only Christianity but all religions as such. When he became president of the Anti-Christian Movement of 1922, he told the Beijing Atheists' League: "Religion is intrinsically old and corrupt: history has passed it by" and asked, "Why are we of the twentieth century... even debating this nonsense from primitive ages?"

== Religious anarchism and anarchist themes in religions ==
Religious anarchists view organized religion mostly as authoritarian and hierarchical that has strayed from its humble origins, as Peter Marshall explains:

The original message of the great religious teachers to live a simple life, to share the wealth of the earth, to treat each other with love and respect, to tolerate others and to live in peace invariably gets lost as worldly institutions take over. Religious leaders, like their political counterparts, accrue power to themselves, draw up dogmas, and wage war on dissenters in their own ranks and the followers of other religions. They seek protection from temporal rulers, bestowing on them in return a supernatural legitimacy and magical aura. They weave webs of mystery and mystification around naked power; they join the sword with the cross and the crescent. As a result, in nearly all cases organised religions have lost the peaceful and tolerant message of their founding fathers, whether it be Buddha, Jesus or Mohammed.

=== Buddhism ===
Many Westerners who call themselves Buddhists regard the Buddhist tradition, in contrast to most other world faiths, as nontheistic, humanistic, and experientially-based. Most Buddhist schools, they point out, see the Buddha as the embodied proof that transcendence and ultimate happiness is possible for all, without exception.

The Indian revolutionary and self-declared atheist Har Dayal, much influenced by Marx and Bakunin, who sought to expel British rule from the subcontinent, was a striking instance of someone who, in the early 20th century, tried to synthesise anarchist and Buddhist ideas. Having moved to the United States in 1912, he went so far as to establish the Bakunin Institute of California in Oakland, which he described as "the first monastery of anarchism".

Zen priest and critic Hakugen Ichikawa, in his condemnation of Buddhist support for Japanese imperialism in Asia, once concluded that "if Buddhism is to possess social thought, it will have to take the form of B-A-C, Buddhism-Anarchism-Communism." Later in his career, he returned to this position, reframing it as "Śūnya-anarchism-communism" (空 - 無政府 - 共同体論), where Śūnya means "the vertical foundation of both the subjectivity that engages in social revolution and, in terms of that subjectivity's basic choices, the humble and open spirit that has been purified from dogmatism, self-absolutism and the will to power." Ultimately, Hakugen suggested that this results in, "negating, in the horizontal dimension, state power; politically, this constitutes anarchism...Through the mediation of the reckoning of philosophical conscience (controlling desires) and by means of social-scientific discernment and Praxis (process), one negates the capitalist system of private ownership and eliminates the social basis of the commodification of human labour power; economically, this amounts to communism." For Hakugen, Śūnya represents a "vertical, existential freedom, whereas anarchism and communism pertain to horizontal freedom, and the 'origin' is the point where the two dimensions of freedom intersect."

Buddhist monk Bhante Sujato,a former musician with the Australian post punk alternative rock band Martha's Vineyard, has established a Buddhist anarchist presence in Australia.

After leaving the lay life and spending many years in contemplation in ascetic training in remote Forest Hermitages in Thailand, he returned to Sydney to establish Lokanta Vihara (the Monastery at the End of the World), to explore what it means to follow the Buddha's teachings in an era of climate change, globalised consumerism, and political turmoil. He is also involved with Engaged Buddhism. In a Buddhist Dharma talk entitled I am an anarchist for Dhammanet, Sujato states his anarchist ideology, specifically aligning himself with anarcho-pacifism, which he explains as being compatible with the Buddha, Buddhism, lay man and lay women's practice and the renunciant life, as well as being in accord with the monastic vinaya. In the speech, Sujato explains his belief that the Buddha himself was also an anarchist.

Bhante Sujato was one of the main figures involved in the struggle, in the face of much opposition, to reintroduce the nun’s ordination lineage in Theravada Buddhism,successfully founding Santi Forest Monastery hermitage in Bundanoon, New South Wales, Australia, which has since flourished as a Bhikkhunī (Buddhist nun) monastery Vihara since 2012.

=== Christianity ===
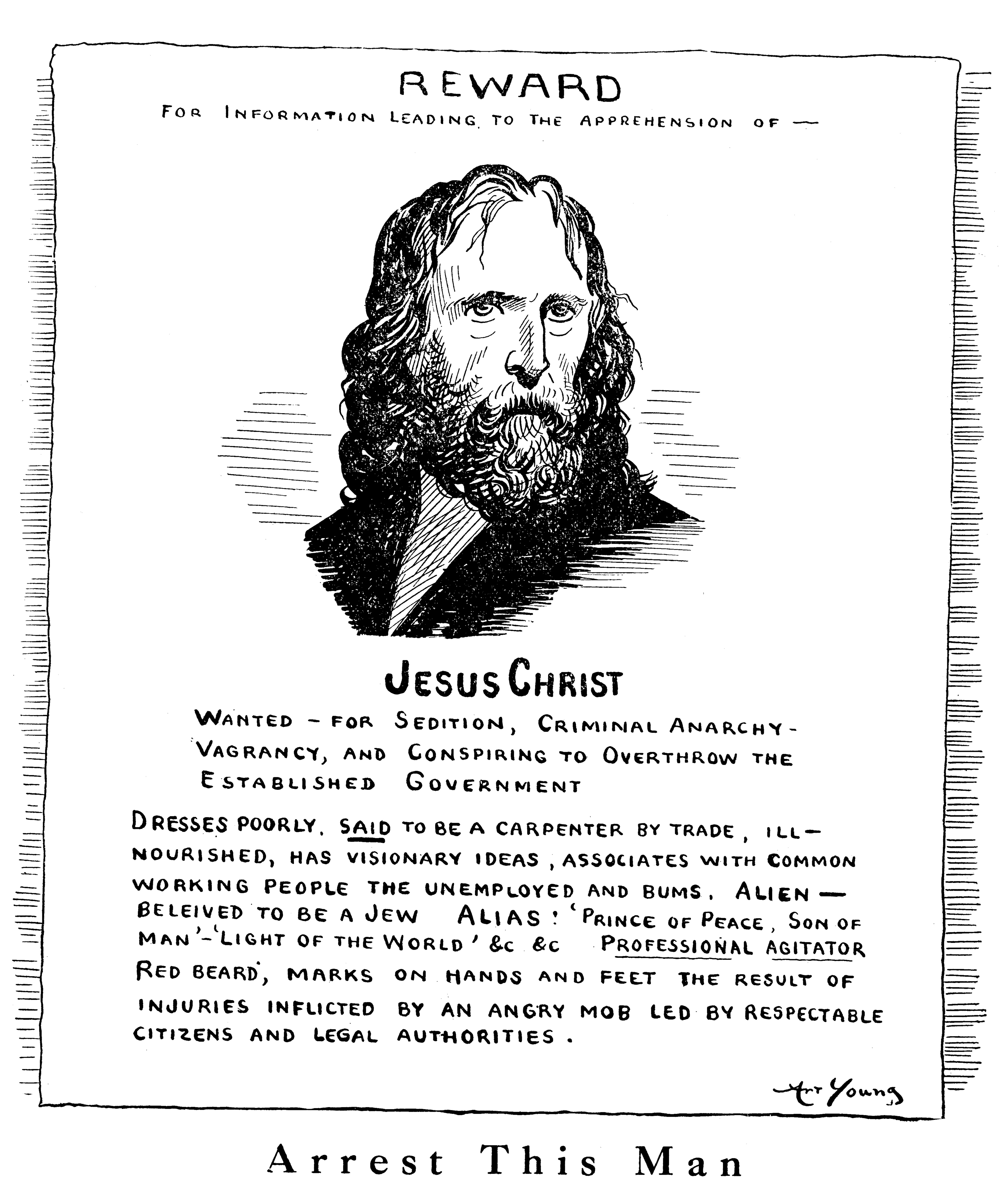
The Masses, a 1917 political cartoon by socialist cartoonist Art Young, which depicts Christ as a man wanted for sedition and other crimes (printed to protest arrests of radical left-wing activists at the time who opposed US involvement in World War One)

According to some, Christianity began primarily as a pacifist and anarchist movement. Jesus is said, in this view, to have come to empower individuals and free people from an oppressive religious standard in the Mosaic law; he taught that the only rightful authority was God, not Man, evolving the law into the Golden Rule (see also liberal Christianity).

As per Christian communism, anarchism is not necessarily opposed by the Catholic Church. Indeed, distributism in Catholic social teaching, such as Pope Leo XIII's encyclical Rerum novarum and Pope Pius XI's Quadragesimo anno, is philosophically similar to anarchism.

=== Islam ===
The Bedouin nomads of the Khawarij were Islam's first sect. They challenged the new centralization of power in the Islamic state as an impediment to their tribe's freedom. At least one sect of Khawarij, the Najdat, believed that if no suitable imam was present in the community, the position could be dispensed with. A strand of Muʿtazili thought paralleled that of the Najdat: if rulers inevitably became tyrants, the only acceptable course of action was to depose them. The Nukkari subsect of Ibadi Islam reportedly adopted a similar belief.

=== Judaism ===
Jacques Ellul recounts that at the end of the Book of Judges (Judges 21:25) there was no king in Israel and everyone did as they saw fit. Later in the first Book of Samuel (1 Samuel 8) the people of Israel wanted a king to be like other nations. God declared that the people had rejected him as their king. He warned that a human king would lead to militarism, conscription, and taxation and that their pleas for mercy from the king's demands would go unanswered. Samuel passed on God's warning to the Israelites but they disregarded him and chose Saul as their king. Much of the subsequent Tanakh chronicles them trying to live with this decision.

The first known Jewish Anarchist organisation in the United States was the Pioneers of Liberty (Pionire der Frayhayt). The Haymarket trial of 1886 sparked nationwide interest in anarchist ideas. On the day of the trial's sentencing, about a dozen Jewish workers of New York's Lower East Side founded the Pioneers of Liberty, the first Jewish anarchist organization in the United States. The group ran Varhayt, a short-lived, first Yiddish-language anarchist newspaper in the United States, between February and June 1889. And together with the Jewish anarchist Knights of Liberty group, which sprang from the Pioneers of Liberty, the two organizations together founded the long-running Yiddish-language anarchist newspaper, Fraye Arbeter Shtime, in 1890. The Pioneers of Liberty also published an annual paper, Tfileh Zakeh (Pure Prayer), which circulated during the Jewish High Holy Days between 1889 and 1893.

The Orthodox Kabbalist rabbi Yehuda Ashlag believed in a religious version of libertarian communism, based on principles of Kabbalah, which he called altruist communism. Ashlag supported the Kibbutz movement and preached to establish a network of self-ruled internationalist communes, who would eventually "annul the brute-force regime completely, for 'every man did that which was right in his own eyes'", because "there is nothing more humiliating and degrading for a person than being under the brute-force government".

A British rabbi, Yankev-Meyer Zalkind, was an anarcho-communist and very active anti-militarist. Rabbi Zalkind, a close friend of Rudolf Rocker, was a prolific Yiddish writer and a prominent Torah scholar. He argued, that the ethics of the Talmud, if properly understood, is closely related to anarchism. Zalkind's philosophy was not popular with British Orthodox Jewry and Zalkind was shunned by the community, with Chief Rabbi Hertz denying Zalkind's rabbinic credentials and Zalkind being forced to renounce his rabbinic title.

The Yiddish anti-authoritarian and anti-police song In Ale Gasn/Daloy Politsey dates from the time of the Russian Revolutions and continues to be sung by artists who identify with political tendencies like anarchism. Many versions of the song have been updated to talk about modern issues such as government corruption, police brutality, and general anarchist themes, along with translating them into languages like English and German. The song is actually a portmanteau of two different Jewish Anarchist songs from the period of the Russian Revolutions, which were combined by Zalmen Mlotek for the film "The Free Voice of Labour: The Jewish Anarchists", 1980.

Over the past decade, there has been a renewed interest in Jewish anarchism due to the growth of organizations like Jewdas and Pink Peacock (UK) and media outlets like the Treyf podcast (Canada). This interest has been aided by the publication of new books on the subject, such as Kenyon Zimmer's Immigrants against the State, and the reissuing of documentaries such as The Free Voice of Labour, which details the final days of the Fraye Arbeter Shtime. In January 2019, The YIVO Institute for Jewish Research organized a special conference on Yiddish anarchism in New York City, which drew over 450 people.

Jewish anarchist newspapers include Arbeter Fraynd, Burevestnik, Chernoe Znamja (Black Flag), Dos Fraye Vort, Fraye Arbeter Shtime, Germinal, and Kagenna Magazine.

Many people of Jewish origin, such as Emma Goldman, Alexander Berkman, Paul Goodman, Murray Bookchin, Volin, Gustav Landauer, David Graeber, and Noam Chomsky have played a role in the history of anarchism. However, as well as these anarchists of Jewish origin, there have also been specifically Jewish anarchist movements, within the Yiddish-speaking communities of Eastern and Central Europe, and the Western cities to which they migrated, from the late nineteenth century until the Second World War. All the members of the first anarchist group in the Russian Empire, which was formed in 1903 in Białystok, were Jews.

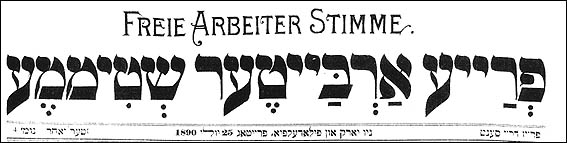
Freie Arbeiter Stimme, vol 1 no 4, Friday, July 25, 1890

Different anarchist groups had different views on Zionism and the Jewish question. Bernard Lazare was a key figure in both the French anarchist movement and early Zionist movement. The later Territorialist movement, especially the Freeland League, under the leadership of Isaac Nachman Steinberg, was very close to anarchism. Some others, such as Martin Buber and Gershom Scholem, advocated non-nationalist forms of Zionism, and promoted the idea of creating a binational Jewish-Arab federation in Palestine. Many contemporary anarchists support the idea of what has been dubbed the "no-state solution". Noam Chomsky has said that, as an anarchist, he ultimately favors such a no-state solution, but, in the short term, feels a two-state solution is the best way out of the present conflict. Within Israel there is also the organisation Anarchists Against the Wall, which is a direct action group composed of Israeli anarchists and anti-authoritarians who oppose the construction of the Israeli Gaza Strip barrier and Israeli West Bank barrier.

=== Taoism ===
Many early Taoists, such as the influential Laozi and Zhuangzi, were critical of authority and advised rulers that the less controlling they were, the more stable and effective their rule would be. However, there are parts of Laozi's Tao Te Ching where an at least stateless, if not anarchistic, viewpoint is more apparent. In chapter 29 it is stated:

Trying to control the world?
I see you won't succeed.
The world is a spiritual vessel
And cannot be controlled.
Those who control, fail.

In Chapter 53:

Granaries are empty,
But the nobels clothes are gorgeous,
Their belts show off swords,
And they are gluted with food and drink.
Personal wealth is excessive.
This is called thieves' endowment,
But it is not Tao.

In chapter 57:

the Sage says...
I enjoy serenity 
And people govern themselves.

In Chapter 66:

Those who would lead
Must speak as if they are behind

In Chapter 68:

The most effective leader takes the
lowest place

In Chapter 72:

When people are not in awe of power,
Power becomes great.[47]

There is still debate among contemporary anarchists about whether or not this counts as an anarchist view. It is known, however, that some less influential Taoists, such as Bao Jingyan, explicitly advocated anarchy.

== Sources ==
- Christoyannopoulos, Alexandre J. M. E., ed. (2011), Religious Anarchism: New Perspectives (Paperback) (1st ed.), Cambridge Scholars Publishing, ISBN 978-1-4438-3189-5
- Helms, Robert P. (2007). "Anarchism and Unbelief". In Richard Dawkins (ed.). The New Encyclopedia of Unbelief. Prometheus Books. pp. 53–56. ISBN 978-1-61592-280-2.
- Zarrow, Peter Gue (1990). Anarchism and Chinese Political Culture. New York: Columbia University Press. ISBN 0231071388..
- Wretch, A. (2016). The Chronicles of Anarchy (a comprehensive exploration of Anarchism and the Occult)..

== See also ==
- Freedom of religion
- Freethought
- Religion and politics
