= Yom Kippur balls =

19th-century anti-Judaism activities in Europe and America

The Yom Kippur balls are countercultural, antireligious celebrations organized by Jewish leftists on Yom Kippur, the holiest day of the Jewish year.

== History ==
The tradition began with British Jewish anarchists in Whitechapel under Benjamin Feigenbaum and spread to New York City, where the Pioneers of Liberty hosted the first American ball in 1889.

By 1891, similar events were held in Baltimore, Boston, Chicago, Philadelphia, Providence, and St. Louis. These gatherings featured singing, dancing, feasting, and speeches from prominent radicals such as Johann Most, Saul Yanovsky, and Roman Lewis. Programs included readings in Yiddish, Russian, and German, as well as performances of revolutionary anthems like La Marseillaise. In some cases, radicals provocatively reinterpreted Jewish rituals—Most delivered the Kol Nidre in 1890, while Moshe Katz gave a sermon on religion's evolution in New England.

For Jewish anarchists of the late 1880s, religion, alongside government and capitalism, represented an obstacle to reason and science. They rejected Jewish orthodoxy while maintaining secular Yiddish culture. The Yom Kippur balls, deliberately held on the solemn Day of Atonement, embodied this defiance, outraging Orthodox communities who saw them as direct assaults on their faith. Tensions sometimes escalated—Philadelphia police raided one such ball in 1891, arresting two attendees for incitement to riot.

Historian Paul Avrich argued that while anarchism was then the largest movement among Jewish-American radicals, the Yom Kippur balls were counterproductive, alienating even nonreligious Jews. By the early 20th century, anarchists were easing away from confrontational antireligious acts. While the balls continued, they became fewer and less provocative. The pogroms in Russia from 1903 to 1906 further shifted some anarchists to the right toward Zionism.

== Bibliography ==
- Avrich, Paul (1988). "Jewish Anarchism in the United States". Anarchist Portraits. Princeton, N.J.: Princeton University Press. pp. 176–199. ISBN 0-691-04753-7. OCLC 17727270.
- Margolis, Rebecca (2004). "A Tempest in Three Teapots: Yom Kippur Balls in London, New York and Montreal". In Menkis, Richard; Ravvin, Norman (eds.). The Canadian Jewish Studies Reader. Calgary, Canada: Red Deer Press. pp. 141–163. ISBN 0-88995-295-7.
  - Margolis, Rebecca E. (2001). "A Tempest in Three Teapots: Yom Kippur Balls in London, New York and Montreal". Canadian Jewish Studies. doi:10.25071/1916-0925.19927. hdl:10393/12990. ISSN 1916-0925.
- Portnoy, Eddy (September 24, 2009). "The Festive Meal: When Yom Kippur Was a Time to Eat, Drink, and Be Merry". Tablet Magazine.
