= Leon Moisseiff =

Suspension bridge engineer

- Born: Leon Solomon Moisseiff; November 10, 1872; Riga, Latvia
- Died: September 3, 1943 (aged 70); Belmar, New Jersey
- Resting place: Mount Hebron Cemetery
- Education: Columbia University
- Known for: Suspension bridge engineering, use of steel in bridges
- Notable work: Manhattan Bridge; George Washington Bridge; Benjamin Franklin Bridge; Golden Gate Bridge; Tacoma Narrows Suspension Bridge of 1940
- Awards: Louis E. Levy Medal (1933)

Leon Solomon Moisseiff (November 10, 1872 – September 3, 1943) was a leading suspension bridge engineer in the United States in the 1920s and 1930s. He was awarded The Franklin Institute's Louis E. Levy Medal in 1933.

His developments of the theory of suspension bridges are eclipsed by the dramatic failure of the Tacoma Narrows Suspension Bridge, his design, four months after its completion in 1940. The event was filmed and is shown to engineering students as a reminder of the possibility of failure and the importance of avoiding hubris.

== Biography ==
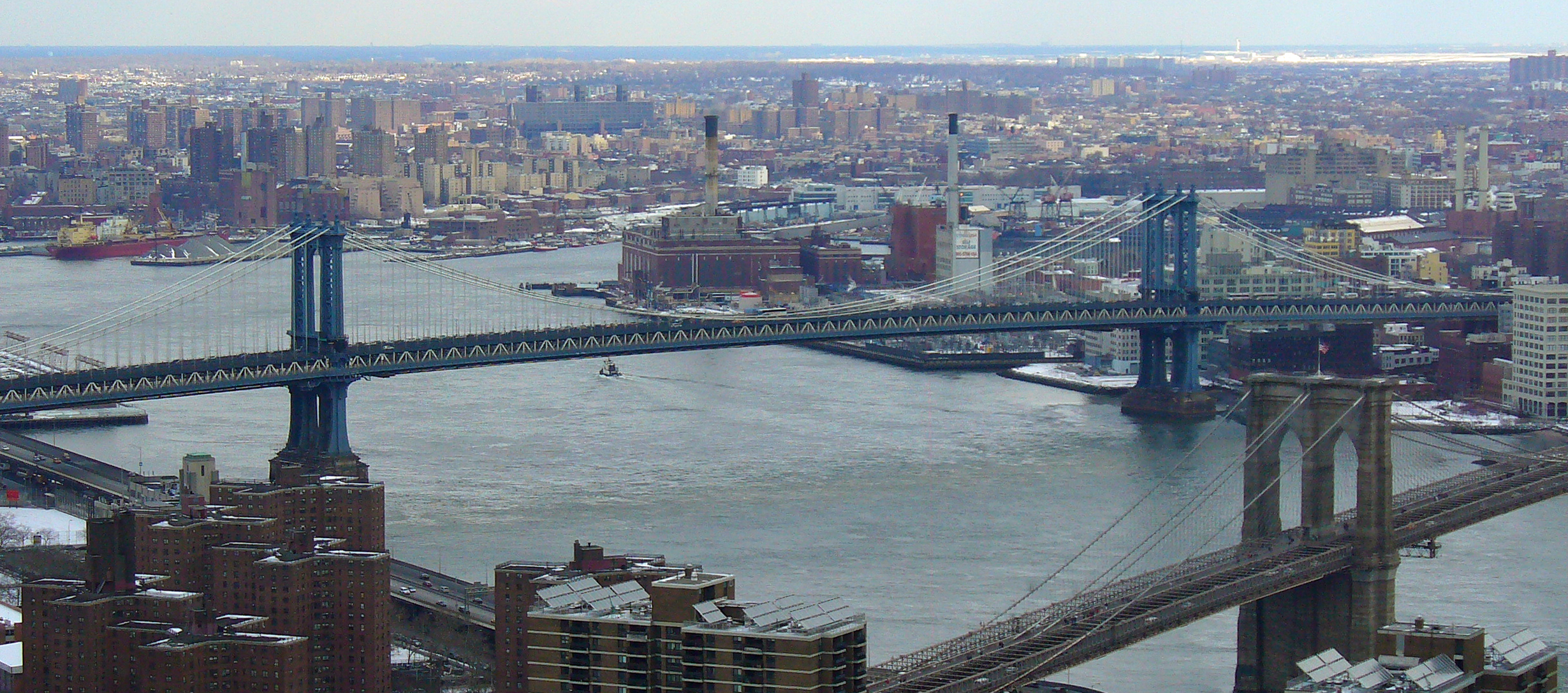
Manhattan Bridge

Moisseiff was born in Riga, Latvia (at the time, Russian Empire), to a Jewish family. He started his education there and studied at the Baltic Polytechnic Institute for three years; he emigrated to the United States with his family at the age of 19, in 1891, because of political activities. In the US, he graduated from Columbia University with a degree in civil engineering in 1895.

In his early 20s, under the pseudonym "M. Leontieff", Moisseiff started a monthly Yiddish-language cultural and literary journal, Di Fraye Gezelshaft. First published in 1895 during an absence from the cultural newspaper Fraye Arbeter Shtime (to which Moisseiff had also contributed), Moisseiff was assisted by the Jewish anarchists J. A. Maryson, Moshe Katz, and Hillel Solotaroff in making the periodical into a leading Yiddish publication, including the foremost Yiddish writers and translations of European anarchists.

He began his career in New York, and gained a national reputation as one of the designers of the Manhattan Bridge over the East River. He also assisted chief engineer Ralph Modjeski in designing the Benjamin Franklin Bridge across the Delaware River.

He was an early advocate of all-steel bridges, which began to replace concrete and stone structures in the 1920s. He became known for his work on "deflection theory," which held that the longer bridges were, the more flexible they could be. Charles Alton Ellis elaborated on Moisseiff's theories, and applied them in the design of the famed Golden Gate Bridge. Moisseiff served as a consulting engineer on the bridge, but declined to speak up for his colleague Charles Ellis when he was fired from the project.

Moisseiff called the Tacoma Narrows Suspension Bridge, the first bridge that he designed as the leading engineer, the "most beautiful bridge in the world." However, he lost his strong reputation when this narrow span across the Puget Sound in Washington State collapsed in a windstorm four months after it opened in 1940.

The motion of the bridge earned it the name Galloping Gertie. The dramatic film of the bridge's collapse, as a twisting motion added to the stress of longitudinal waves along the span, is still shown to engineering, architecture, and physics students as a good example of torsional flutter gone awry.

The bridge was redesigned and rebuilt in 1950 to carry westbound traffic. Another bridge was completed to carry eastbound traffic in 2007.

In response to concerns after the failure of the Tacoma Narrows Bridge in 1940 and a major San Francisco Bay windstorm in 1951, the Golden Gate Bridge, for which Moisseiff had served as a consulting engineer during construction, was briefly closed. The bridge was inspected and underwent retrofitting to be more resistant to the types of twisting that led to bridge collapse at Tacoma Narrows.

On occasion, Leon Moisseiff was involved in resolving tensions between workers and their employers. In 1914, Benjamin Schlesinger of the International Ladies Garment Workers Union (ILGWU) contacted Leon Moisseiff to assist in convincing the clothing manufacturers of Philadelphia to come to an agreement with the union before a major strike broke out. (Lorwin, pp. 277–278)

== Death and legacy ==
In 1941, the U.S. Public Roads Administration established the Advisory Board on the Investigation of Suspension Bridges, which hired Moissieff as a consultant. He was asked to chair one of the board's 5 subcommittees, but due to his failing health he did not actively participate.

Moisseiff died of a heart attack in 1943. His son felt that the bridge failure contributed to his death.

Though he had designed many other famous spans, the Narrows collapse overshadowed them all. It became a symbol of failed engineering and the dangers of arrogance in design. As tragic as this disastrous design flaw became to Moisseiff personally, it motivated the engineers to further research and substantially improve the design and safety of suspension bridges.

In 1947, board members and the American Society of Civil Engineers established the Moissieff Award to be given to an exemplary paper in the field of structural design. The award, including a bronze medal showing Moisseiff's profile and a cash prize paid out by the fund's trust, have been given out by the ASCE every year since.

== Bibliography ==
- Avrich, Paul (1988). "Jewish Anarchism in the United States". Anarchist Portraits. Princeton, N.J.: Princeton University Press. pp. 176–199. ISBN 978-0-691-04753-9. OCLC 17727270.
- Moisseiff, Leon S. Suspension Bridges Under the Action of Lateral Forces, in "Transactions of the American Society of Civil Engineers", 1933, n. 98.
- Henry Petroski (1995). Engineers of Dreams: Great Bridge Builders and the Spanning of America. Knopf, New York. ISBN 978-0-679-43939-4. (for more information about Moiseiff and his career)
- Louise Nelson Dyble (2009). Paying the Toll: Local Power, Regional Politics, and the Golden Gate Bridge. Philadelphia: University of Pennsylvania Press. ISBN 978-0-8122-4147-1.
