= Anarchism in America =

Anarchism in America may refer to:

- Anarchism in America (film), a 1983 film
- Anarchism in the United States
