= Joseph Cohen =

Joseph Cohen may refer to:

- Joseph J. Cohen (1878–1953), Russian–American anarchist and founder of intentional communities
- Joseph Cohen (solicitor) (1889–1980) solicitor and property developer; head of the Jacey Cinemas chain; prominent figure in the Jewish community of Birmingham, England
- Joseph Cohen (politician) (1891–1973), Canadian lawyer, academic, and politician
- Joseph Cohen (philosopher), French philosopher
- Joe Cohen (born 1984), American player of American and Canadian football
