= Critz =

Critz, de Critz (also Decritz), and Kritz is a surname. Notable people with the name include:

Critz

- Hugh Critz (1876–1939), president of Mississippi State University
- Hughie Critz (1900–1980), American baseball player
- Mark Critz (born 1962), American politician from Pennsylvania

de Critz (Decritz)

- John de Critz (1551/2–1642), Flemish painter
- Thomas de Critz (1607–1653), English painter

Kritz

- Karl Kritz (1906–1969), Austrian conductor
- Ori Kritz, Israeli language and literature professor
