= Les Temps nouveaux =

Les Temps nouveaux may refer to:

- Les Temps nouveaux (newspaper) (1895-1914), an anarchist newspaper founded in 1895 by Jean Grave
- Les Temps nouveaux (voluntary organisation) (2003), a voluntary organisation founded by the Socialist Party (France)
