= Leah Feldman =

Anarchist (1899–1993)

- לאה פֿעלדמאן
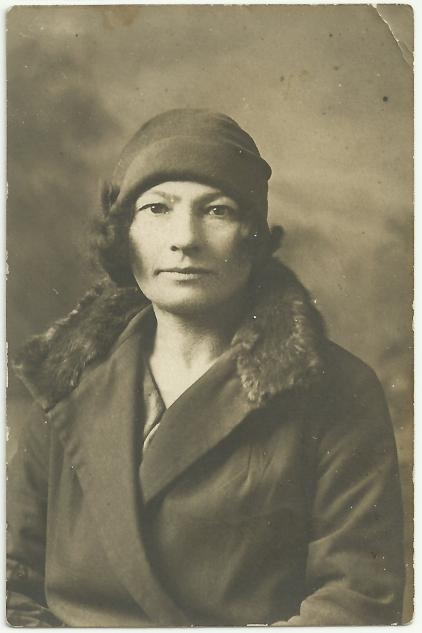
- Leah Feldman (1919)
- Born: September 1898; Odesa, Russian Empire
- Died: 3 January 1993 (aged 94); London, England
- Other name: Leah Downes
- Citizenship: British (from 1931)
- Occupations: Furrier; Milliner; Seamstress; Political activist
- Movement: Anarchism

Leah Feldman (Yiddish: לאה פֿעלדמאן; September 1898 – 3 January 1993), also known as Leah Downes, was an Odesa-born anarchist garment worker who for most of her adult life was based in London, England. Feldman was active in the anarchist movement for almost 80 years, and towards the end of her life she acted as a last living link in the British anarchist movement to the Russian revolution, the Revolutionary Insurgent Army of Ukraine, and the pre-WWI Jewish anarchist movement in the East End of London.

== Biography ==
Feldman was born to a Yiddish-speaking Jewish family in Odesa in September 1898. The family moved to Warsaw, Poland, while Feldman was still young and she joined a socialist club when she was 12. In 1913 Feldman moved to England with some relatives, against her mother's wishes, where she began work as a furrier and first encountered the anarchist movement. Feldman read Peter Kropotkin's pamphlet An Appeal to the Young and began attending a sunday school at the Jubilee Street Anarchist Club. She took part in the Yiddish language trade unionism that was active in East London.

The first world war prevented Feldman from rejoining her family in Warsaw. In May 1917, like many Russian and Eastern European Jewish anarchists in Britain, Leah moved to Russia to take part in the Russian revolution. She met Kropotkin in Russia, and in May 1921 attended his funeral in Moscow. While some Western anarchists of the time shifted to supporting Bolshevism, Feldman was fiercely critical of the new Bolshevik government and remained so for the rest of her life. Feldman travelled to Ukraine to take part in the Makhnovist movement, working as a seamstress during the civil war.

In 1927 she travelled to Berlin, then lived in Paris for a year before returning to London in 1928. She had at first been denied entry to the UK, finding herself stateless, so in 1931 she married a British ex-serviceman to gain British citizenship. She continued to work as a garment worker but found the anarchist movement in London depressing and in retreat. She lived in Palestine for four years in the 1930s, returning to London in 1936 where she was active in supporting the anarchist movement in the Spanish revolution. She helped push for the decision for the Freedom Press group to use the group's remaining assets to support the new newspaper Spain and the World.

Feldman was, alongside Lilian Wolfe, a regular street seller of the anarchist newspaper Freedom for many decades. She was active in campaigns relating to the Angry Brigade, the execution of Sacco and Vanzetti, Anarchist Black Cross campaigns for anarchist dissidents in Francoist Spain, and the anti-nuclear marches of the 1960s.

Feldman was registered blind after her eyesight was damaged in a bomb blast, which had been worsened by an accident in surgery. In her seventies she travelled to Warsaw to try and trace her relatives, all of whom had perished. She died in London on 3 January 1993 at the age of 94.
