= Mécislas Golberg =

French modernist and anarchist author

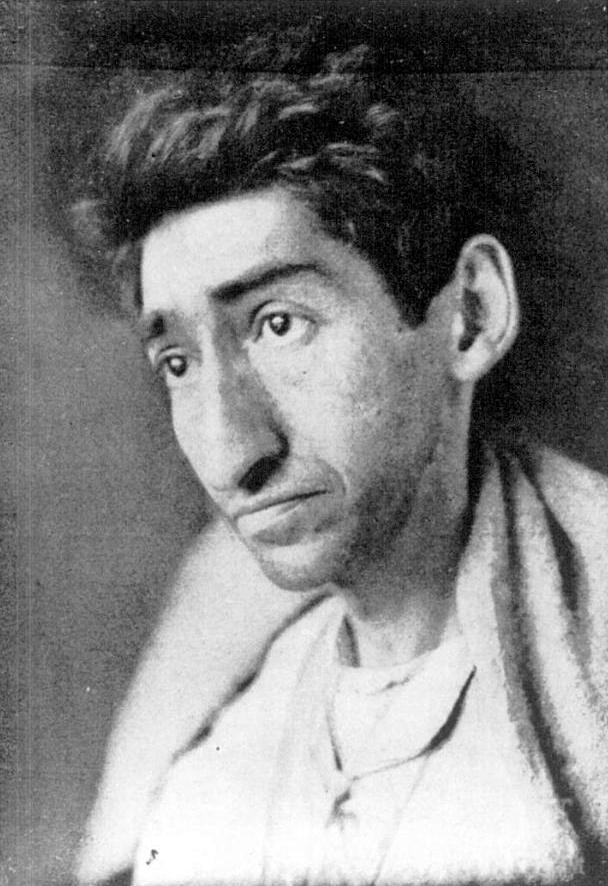
- Born: Mieczysław Goldberg; October 21, 1869; Płock, Płock Governorate, Congress Poland
- Died: December 28, 1907 (aged 38); Fontainebleau, Seine-et-Marne, French Third Republic
- Occupations: essayist, poet, playwright, journalist, art critic

Mécislas Golberg (born October 21, 1869, Płock, Poland; died December 28, 1907, Fontainebleau, France) was an essayist, poet, playwright, journalist, and art critic associated with modernism and anarchism.

== Biography ==
Golberg was born Mieczysław Goldberg in Płock, Russian Empire, to a Jewish family of nine children. His parents, Schlomo Leb Goldberg and Julie Danzyger, were merchants.

He attended school in Geneva before moving to Paris, where he enrolled in medical school, but he did not complete his studies. After a suicide attempt by poison, he dedicated himself to political activism and writing.

In 1895, he had a son with Berthe Charrier. He abandoned the child at the age of five.

Due to his outspoken political views, he was expelled from France twice. The first time, in 1896, he fled to London, where he worked as a coffee vendor for nine months before returning clandestinely to France and resuming his writing. After the second time, in 1899, he was able to return by attaining a residency permit. By 1903, he was attending the salons organized by La Plume, where he met Guillaume Apollinaire, Alfred Jarry, and André Salmon.

His friends included Antoine Bourdelle, Camille Claudel, André Gide, Max Jacob, Henri Matisse, Henri de Régnier, Henri-Pierre Roché, Auguste Rodin, Jules Romains, and Séverine.

Golberg died of tuberculosis in Fontainebleau.

== Works and influence ==
Sometimes writing under pseudonyms, Golberg contributed to Guillaume Apollinaire's journal Le Festin d'Ésope, Sébastien Faure's anarchist magazine Le Libertaire, Jean Grave's Les Temps nouveaux, Mercure de France, La Plume, L'Aurore, and Sur le trimard, of which he was the editor.

Golberg authored several books, the chief and last of which was La morale des lignes [The Moral of the Lines], which had significant influence on Matisse and the Symbolists. French journalist Florent Fels recorded that he learned of Golberg when he was introduced to La morale des lignes by the painter Maurice de Vlamnick, who called Golberg "a Nietzschean genius." The book was illustrated with the drawings of André Rouveyre, which Golberg discussed as exemplary of his theories.

Roger Shattuck described Golberg as "an emigrant Pole with violent ideas and the appearance of a prophet and a fakir, whose influence supplemented Jarry's in influencing Apollinaire of the significance of a special form of humor and distortion in art."

== Views ==
Golberg was a Dreyfusard and contributed to a libertarian Zionist newspaper called Le Flambeau.
