= La Société mourante et l'anarchie =

1893 book by Jean Grave

Moribund Society and Anarchy
- Author: Jean Grave
- Original title: La Société mourante et l'anarchie
- Translator: Voltairine de Cleyre
- Language: French
- Publisher: Tresse et Stock
- Publication date: 1893
- English publication date: 1899
- Pages: 298
- OCLC: 7289330
- Original text: La Société mourante et l'anarchie at HathiTrust
- Translation: Moribund Society and Anarchy at Google Books

La Société mourante et l'anarchie, translated as Moribund Society and Anarchy, (Note: Also translated as The Dying Society and Anarchy) is an 1893 book by Jean Grave that argues for the speedy disintegration of moribund societal institutions.

== Publication ==
Grave first published the book in June 1893 with a preface by Octave Mirbeau.

In London, Grave met American anarchist Voltairine de Cleyre, who agreed to translate the book from French to English at the urging of London anarchists, who offered her a British publisher. She began her translation, Moribund Society and Anarchy, upon her return to the United States in late 1897. Abraham Isaak ultimately published the translation in the United States with the San Francisco Free Society Library in 1899. De Cleyre wrote a preface for the translation.

Moshe Katz translated the book into Yiddish in 1894.

Grave quarreled with Stock over the book's second edition. Grave decided to publish instead with the anarchist Jean Tordeur in Belgium in late 1893. This second edition was "cheap and slightly enlarged". Because Grave had added chapter to this edition, the government considered the publication to be new and subject to a fresh December 1893 law (later known as the first of the three "lois scélérates") against publishing "indirect provocation to crime". Grave was ultimately arrested for this second edition in January 1894 and went on trial the next month. He was sentenced to two years in prison and fined 1,000 francs. Grave was also tried in the 1894 Trial of the Thirty later that year, where he was acquitted, but went to prison to serve his prior sentence. Grave was freed with more than 12 months of his sentence remaining when Félix Faure became president in January 1895.

== Reception ==
History professor George Elison called the book "quite possibly the best introduction to anarchism ever written".

== Bibliography ==
- Avrich, Paul (1978). An American Anarchist: The Life of Voltairine De Cleyre. Princeton University Press. ISBN 978-0-691-04657-0.
- Carr, R. P. (July 1978). "Anarchism and Literature: Octave Mirbeau and the Second Edition of Jean Grave's La Societe Mourante Et L'anarchie". Quinquereme. 1 (2): 189–199. ISSN 0140-3397. OCLC 827255417. ProQuest 1293538345.
