= Worker's Friend Group =

Jewish anarchist group in London

The Worker's Friend Group was an English Jewish anarchist group which was active in the East End of London in the early 1900s. It was associated with the weekly Yiddish-language anarchist newspaper Arbeter Fraint (Worker's Friend). It was centered around the German emigré anarchist Rudolf Rocker. And it ran a social center known as the Worker's Friend Club and Institute and Jubilee Street Club. The club became a fixture in London's Jewish social community and was influential on the area's artists and writers. Its cultural programming included concerts, performances, and lectures on political, scientific, and literary topics. Its newspaper began in 1885 as a Jewish socialist periodical and grew towards anarchism with the arrival of Saul Yanovsky, an American anarchist and journalist. By 1904 it was the most popular radical Yiddish-language newspaper in London, reaching a peak circulation at 5,000 weekly copies in the following year. The operations of the group declined following the British entry into World War I, as rising anti-German sentiment and Rocker's anti-war beliefs culminated in his detention, and it closed in 1910. The newspaper ceased publication in 1915.

== Group ==
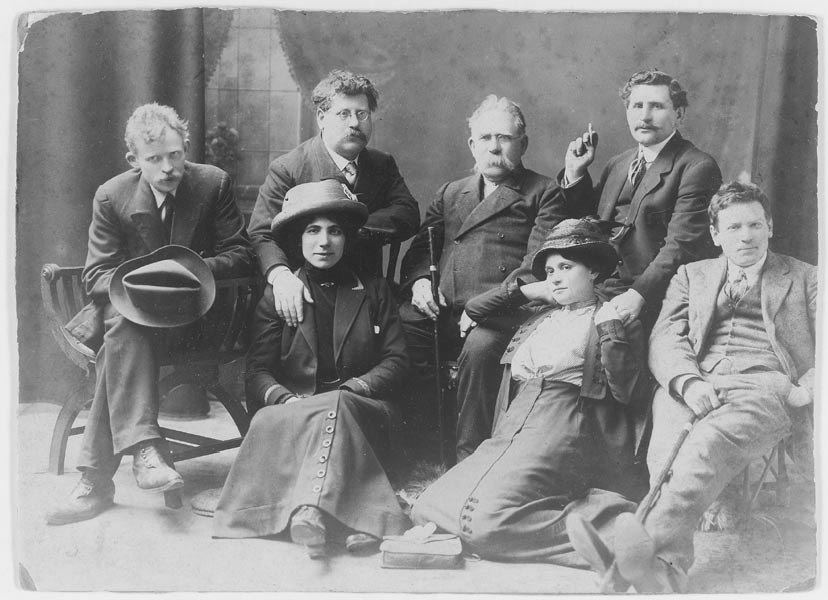
Rudolf Rocker (back row, second from left) with several London anarchists. Rocker's arm lies over Milly Witkop's shoulder.

The basis of the Workers' Friend Group, or the Arbeter Frainters, was the foundation in 1885 of Arbeter Fraynd (The Worker's Friend), London's first Jewish newspaper, by Russian émigré and Jewish socialist, Morris Winchevsky. In the following June, the Berner Street Club took control of it. From the early 1900s through 1914 Winchevsky was joined by two or three dozen comrades. The group was small and elitist in the face of a predominantly religious immigrant culture. As a group of close-knit friends, who lived in close proximity as a "quasi-Libertarian commune", they regularly raised funds for their club. The editorial group would meet in a member's handbag workshop as an editorial group, discuss the newspaper's next issue, and pool funds, often a significant part of their wages.

The group would fundraise through socials and balls, which brought together both those politically aligned and not. Their two or three masked balls would raise up to £30 in an evening (equivalent to £3,154 in 2025), with vocal performances and a lecture from Rudolf Rocker. Some workshops nailed a cigar box to their walls to collect pennies for the paper. Other sweatshop workers contributed pennies from their meager incomes. Proceeds from literature and personal subsidies also funded the group.

Those associated with the group lived in unspoken agreement that all ages and sexes were to be treated as free equals, without patronization. The group's main opponents were the Freiheit group from London's West End, who had previously broke with Rocker ideologically.

=== Club ===
Confrontations in the community reinforced the group's need for a permanent clubhouse. Having saved enough, per treasurer Lazar Sabelinsky, the group began to rent a two-storey building in 1906 at 165 Jubilee Street, a former Methodist church and Salvation Army depot that was often rented for social events. The building's owner liked the group's restrained mode of operating and Rocker's transparency. Sabelinsky, Prusky, Freeman, and Schatz together leased the building but its operations were self-managed. After several weeks of preparations and interior design from anarchists and non-anarchist artisans alike, the group built a stage and bar in the great hall. Contributors donated tables and chairs in the lower hall, which could fit 800. Workers built shelves in the second storey, which became a library. The adjacent 163 Jubilee Street became the Arbeter Fraint headquarters.

The Worker's Friend Club and Institute, also known as the Jubilee Street Club, opened on February 3, 1906. Opening festivities filled the building to its capacity despite the opening being on a Sabbath Saturday. Rocker inaugurated the opening with a speech on events predating the group's purchase of the lease and the drive of federated Yiddish-speaking anarchists. Rocker read statements in support from Jewish labor unions, Errico Malatesta, and Fernando Tarrida del Mármol, but was cut short when Peter Kropotkin appeared at the event to applause. Kropotkin, who had been ill, congratulated the crowd and spoke about their cause. John Turner compared the club to its Berner Street Club predecessor, and called the Jubilee Street Club more sophisticated. The Cockney carman Ted Leggatt also spoke before the festivities turned to a recital and then a band.

The club became a Jewish social community fixture as a place for recreation, refreshment, and debate, until its closure in 1910, as a result of financial and organisational difficulties and a dispute with the landlord. Historian William J. Fishman likened the club's activity, which welcomed all across age, political, and intellectual divides, to that of Toynbee Hall. Its library, reading room, and classes were open to the community. This restricted the club from the lucrative practice of selling alcohol, based on laws that limited service to membership. Members maintained its bar, which served coffee, tea, and food. Both men and women volunteered to serve and clean, though cooking fell mainly to the women. Volunteers recalled seeing both famous figures at the club and serving Jewish orthodox the night of Kol Nidre, usually a time for fasting.

Cultural programming at the club included concerts, lectures, and performances. The stage hosted early performances by future Yiddish theatre figures Samuel Goldenberg and Abraham Teitelbaum. Theatrical performances included that of Leonid Andreyev and Sholem Aleichem. The stage featured classes and lectures from Rocker, Malatesta, Kropotkin, and Varlam Cherkezov on political, scientific, and literary topics. Public discussions, such as on the existence of God, invited all attendees to participate. On Sundays, the club hosted tea and sandwiches with a lecture. In the summers, the group would make a trip to Epping Forest, schlepping tables, drinks, and food from the club by horse and cart. The group explored the forest and Rocker would lecture.

Socials, dances, concerts, and the newspaper no longer sufficed to meet operating costs. The group rented the space, mainly to radical groups, for occasional functions. Small labor unions and branches of the Workers' circle and Russian Social Revolutionaries used the building for recurring meetings.

The group ultimately functioned as more of a social center than a revolutionary hotbed. The group's only public agitation was strike actions. The club's open nature made it susceptible to revolutionary emigres, who kept their same anti-bourgeois fervor in Britain. Considering agent provocateurs and double agents like the Azef affair, the club became wary of political emigrees. Rocker, a voice of moderation, held that terrorism was a setback for the movement, and the group did worry that propaganda of the deed in London would endanger their club. Indeed, the only occasion that threatened the club's closure was the events surrounding the Siege of Sidney Street. The police monitored the club but took no major action.

== Newspaper ==
The rise of pogroms against Jews in Russia in the early 1880s set off an exodus. The two million emigres created Yiddish newspapers, cultural organizations, and unions where they landed. In Great Britain, the Jewish population more than quadrupled between the 1880s and 1919. The Russian emigres tended to live in poorer areas, such as London's East End. One of these emigres, the Jewish socialist Morris Winchevsky created Arbeter Fraint in July 1885 as a Jewish socialist monthly, though the paper allowed anarchists and other radicals to contribute. The Jewish Workers' Educational Club took over editorial responsibilities in June 1886, whereupon the periodical became a weekly magazine that reached beyond London. The Haymarket affair attracted anarchist sympathies among Jewish immigrants in London. The Arbeter Fraint developed an international tone, printing letters from Jewish writers around the world.

In October 1898, Rudolf Rocker became an editor of the Arbeter Fraint. Saul Yanovsky, recruited to come to London, became an editor in 1891 and brought anarchist influence with him. The paper published articles by Yanovsky and other leading anarchists, as well as anarchist pamphlets (in Yiddish). By 1892, the periodical had the subtitle, "Anarchist-Communist Organ".

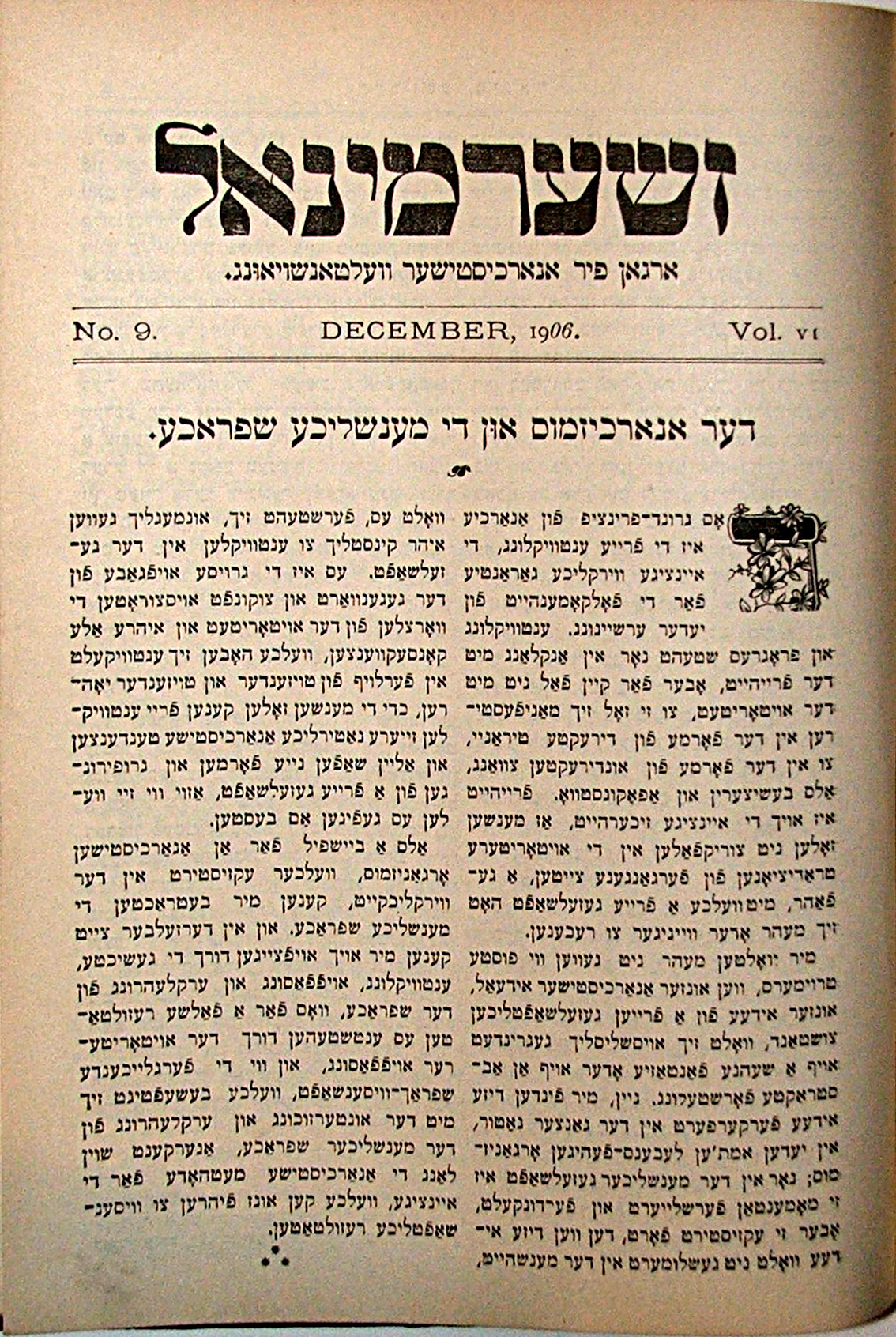
December 1906 edition of Germinal, the newspaper's literary/cultural companion

By 1904, the Arbeter Fraint was "the most popular radical newspaper in Yiddish" in London. It reached peak circulation at 5,000 weekly copies in early 1905 as the area's main radical Yiddish paper. The newspaper's noteworthy collaborators included Abraham Frumkin.

Britain's declaration of war against Germany in August 1914 ended the anarchist movement in London's East End. The anarchists held opposing positions on the war. Arbeter Fraint reduced in size as its readership declined. Its October and November columns contained arguments for and against the war. Rocker had a four-part column in opposition, which was dangerous to print. In early December 1914, Rocker was arrested at home and would be interned for four years before being expelled. In 1915, the police closed the Arbeter Fraint press and offices. The club faded. The building was used as a cinema and then as a synagogue.

The newspaper was revived in 1920 by the religious anarchist Yankev-Meyer Zalkind, coming out monthly in 1920, biweekly in 1921, weekly and again biweekly in 1922 and 1923. Zalkind edited it and wrote most of it, both under his own name and using pseudonyms such as Dr. Y. M. Salinfante, Pyer Romus, Y. M. Mivne Hekhala, B. Mayer, S. Zalkin, Osip S., M. Volodin, Eygen Haynrikh Shmit, and M. Gracchus. It also published articles by Rocker, Witkop, Mikhl Kohen, Shloyme Ben-Dovid, Saul Linder, V. Rubtshinski and Volin. Between 1920 and 1923, the paper printed a series of autobiographical tales by Sholem Shvartsbard, the poet who assassinated Ukrainian nationalist Symon Petliura to avenge the Ukrainian pogroms. It also published an educational supplement for youth titled Der yunger dor (The Young Generation) from 15 September 1922 to 12 January 1923. Both the adult and youth editions carried poetry, such as by modernists Peretz Markish and Leyb Kvitko

== Legacy ==
Yiddish scholar Joseph Leftwich later wrote of the Workers' Friend Club's great influence on artists and writers in London's East End. The Workers' Friend paper and associated Jubilee Street Club were aspects of the best supported and most influential anarchist movement Britain has seen.

Some members of the Workers' Friend group moved to New York and participated in radical Yiddish culture there, including the Fraye Arbeter Shtime. Members of the Workers' Friend group helped to found in 1903 the English branch of the socialism-focused Jewish Workers' Circle, a mutual aid organization based in the United States. The English branch expanded to its peak membership in the interwar period.

== Bibliography ==
- Fishman, William J. (1975). Jewish Radicals: From Czarist Stetl to London Ghetto. New York: Pantheon Books. ISBN 978-0-394-49764-8.
- Hikaru, Tanaka (2013). "The Reaction of Jewish Anarchists". In Gavin, Masako; Middleton, Ben (eds.). Japan and the High Treason Incident. Routledge. ISBN 978-1-135-05056-6.
- Kops, Bernard (1990). "East End heydays". New Statesman & Society (30 April): 44-45.
- Kritz, Ori (2008). "Morris Winchevsky (1856-1932)". In Norwood, Stephen A.; Pollack, Eunice G. (eds.). Encyclopedia of American Jewish History. Vol. 2. Santa Barbara, California: ABC-CLIO. ISBN 978-1-85109-638-1.
- Oliver, H. (1983). The International Anarchist Movement in Late Victorian London. London: Croom Helm. ISBN 0-7099-1929-8.
