= Saul Yanovsky =

American Yiddish anarchist and journalist

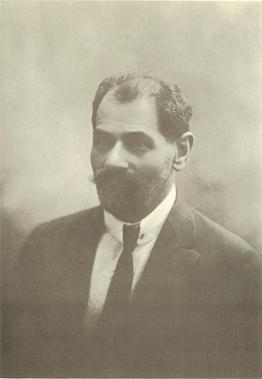
A portrait of Saul Yanovsky, taken in New York City c. 1910

Saul Yanovsky (Yiddish: שאול יאנאווסקי) (April 18, 1864, in Pinsk – February 1, 1939) was an American anarchist and journalist.

He is best remembered as the editor of the Yiddish anarchist newspaper Fraye Arbeter Shtime, a role he held for twenty years. He contributed to other newspapers including the London anarchist newspaper Arbayter Fraynd and socialist competitor Forverts, He was a member of the Jewish-anarchist group Pioneers of Liberty.

Yanovsky was one of the most influential editors in Yiddish journalism. Sociologist Robert E. Park remarked that writing for Yanovsky was the equivalent of a Yiddish literary passport. However, if Yanovsky thought a submission was subpar, the submission risked being subjected to his biting sarcasm and literary wrath in his dedicated section in the Fraye Arbeter Shtime.

== Personal life ==
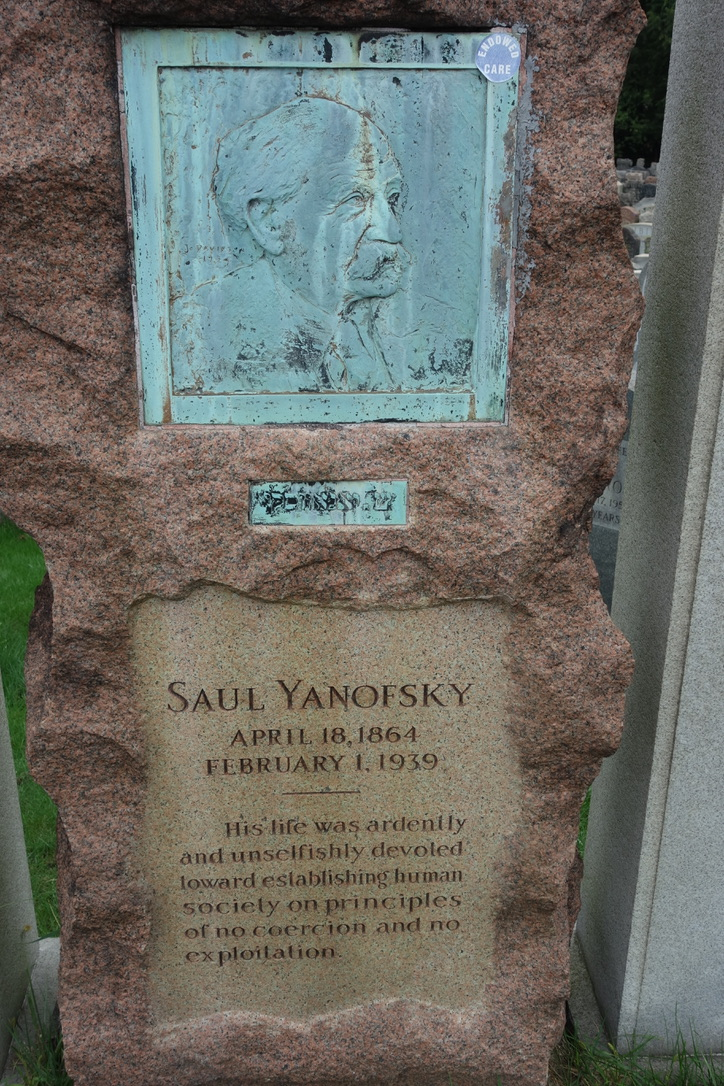
Gravestone of Saul Yanovsky in Mount Carmel Cemetery, Queens

Saul Joseph Yanovsky born in Pinsk, Russia on April 18, 1864. His father was a cantor and his grandfather a rabbi. Yanovsky spoke Russian natively and also knew Yiddish through his mother. He attended gymnasium in Bialystok, Russia where he studied Russian literature. In 1885 he migrated to New York. In 1890 he moved to London to take over the editorship of Arbayter Fraynd. In 1895 he returned to New York. He died on February 1, 1939, from lung cancer. He is buried in the Workmen's Circle section in Mount Carmel Cemetery, Queens, New York.

== Career ==
In 1890, 32 anarchist groups of the Pioneers of Liberty agreed on establishing Fraye Arbeter Shtime. Despite founding the newspaper, Yanovsky moved to London to take over as editor of Arbayter Fraynd, where he came into contact with famous anarchists Malatesta, Nettlau and Kropotkin. In 1893, Yanovsky criticized the Spanish anarchist bombings, a stance which forced him to resign from the newspaper.

When Yanovsky returned to New York in 1895, the Yiddish anarchist movement was in disarray. A small sign of hope was Di Fraye Gezelshaft (The Free Society) an intellectual journal that had a small circulation. Yanovsky immediately campaigned to revive the Fraye Arbeter Shtime which went defunct in 1893. After four years of campaigning, even against editors of Di Fraye Gezelshaft, Yanovsky prevailed and became the new editor of Fraye Arbeter Shtime in October 1899. The newspaper's growth strategy included promoting "constructive anarchism" by engaging trade unions, education and cooperatives.

In 1906, Yanovsky founded Di Abend Tsaytung (The Evening Newspaper) to compete with the popular socialist newspaper Forverts, but Di Abend Tsaytung folded after a mere two months. More successfully, he revived Di Fraye Gezelshaft in 1910–1911 as a monthly literary supplement to the Fraye Arbeter Shtime. Fifty Fraye Gezelshaft literary clubs formed across North America.

By 1919, Fraye Arbeter Shtime circulation dropped by half, and he was forced to resign as the paper's editor due to difference of opinions over the Russian revolution and World War I.

Immediately after leaving Fraye Arbeter Shtime, Yanovsky was recruited as an editor for the International Ladies Garment Workers Union's newly established newspaper Gerekhtigkayt (Justice) upon invitation by former wobbly and union-treasurer Morris Sigman. The union was embroiled in factionalism between communists on one side and anarchists and social democrats on the other. In a 1925 truce, Sigman (then union president) allowed back formerly expelled communists. Yanovsky resigned in protest of concessions to "the worst enemies of the union".

In 1933, after Joseph J. Cohen stepped down as editor of Fraye Arbeter Shtime, editorial control was replaced temporarily by a committee which included former editors Yanovsky and Michael A. Cohn until Mark Mratchny succeeded them later that year.

Yanovsky had a labor column in the competitor newspaper Forverts, but he left over a dispute with Abraham Cahan, the newspaper founder.

== Political views ==
In 1893, Yanovsky criticized the violence of the Spanish anarchist bombings and the repression it brought, as counter-effective. He denounced propaganda by the deed after the assassination of William McKinley.

Yanovsky criticized anarchist support for the 1917 Russian revolution, calling the Bolsheviks "not kosher". He had harsh words for anarchists returning from Russia..."I have raised a generation of idiots".

Like many anarchists, Yanovsky opposed US involvement in World War I, however with the downfall of the Russian czar, he argued that support for the Western power was preferable to rise of the German imperialists, a position shared by Kropotkin but incredibly unpopular with his readers.
