= Ahrne Thorne =

Polish-born American anarchist newspaper editor and writer

- Born: Ahrne Thorenberg; December 26, 1904; Łódź, Poland
- Died: December 13, 1985 (aged 80); The Bronx, New York, U.S.
- Other name: P. Constan
- Occupations: Newspaper editor; Writer; Typesetter; Printer
- Spouse: Paula Konstantinovskaya (m. 1935)

Ahrne Thorne (December 26, 1904 – December 13, 1985) was a Polish-born American anarchist newspaper editor and writer. He was assistant editor of the anarchist Yiddish-language newspaper Fraye Arbeter Shtime from 1952 to 1957, and editor from 1975, until it ceased publication in 1977.

== Biography ==
Thorne was born Ahrne Thorenberg in Łódź, Poland on December 26, 1904, to an orthodox Hasidic Jewish family. In his teens he moved to Paris, abandoned his Hasidic background and became an anarchist in response to the trial of Sacco and Vanzetti. His sister, who remained in Poland, later died in Auschwitz. In 1930 he moved to Toronto, became a friend of Emma Goldman, and began contributing to Fraye Arbeter Shtime, alongside other papers. He often wrote under the pen name P. Constan. From 1940 until 1974, he worked in New York City as a typesetter and printer for the Jewish Daily Forward. Thorne was interviewed for the documentary The Free Voice of Labour: The Jewish Anarchists. He died from cancer December 13, 1985, aged 80, at home in the Bronx.

== See also ==
- Anarchism in the United States
