= Fraye Arbeter Shtime =

Yiddish anarchist newspaper (1890–1977)

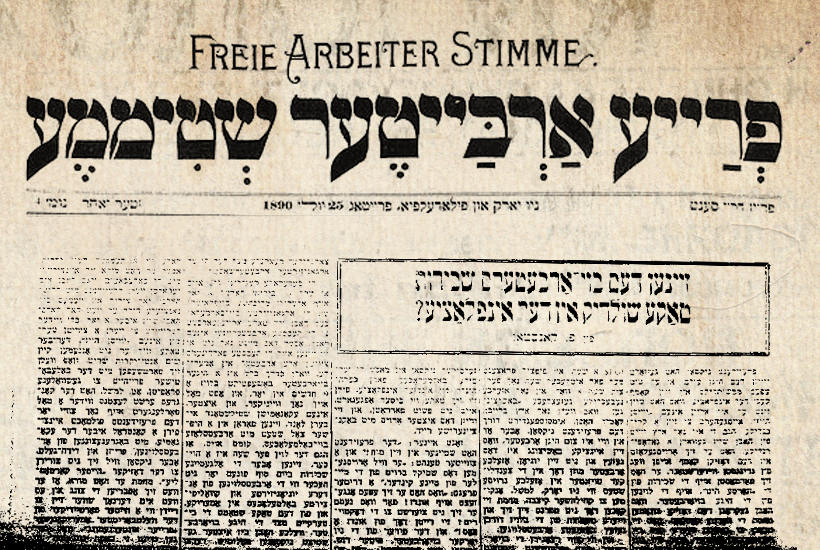
- Front page of an 1890 edition
- Type: Weekly newspaper
- Launched: July 4, 1890
- Ceased publication: December 4, 1977 (87 years)
- Political alignment: Anarchism
- Language: Yiddish
- City: New York City
- Country: United States
- ISSN: 0016-0733
- OCLC number: 2739515

Freie Arbeiter Stimme (Daytshmerish spelling of Yiddish: פֿרייע אַרבעטער שטימע romanized: Fraye arbeṭer shṭime, lit. 'Free Voice of Labor' also spelled with an extra mem פֿרייע אַרבעטער שטיממע) was a Yiddish-language anarchist newspaper published from New York City's Lower East Side between 1890 and 1977. It was among the world's longest running anarchist journals, and the primary organ of the Jewish anarchist movement in the United States; at the time that it ceased publication it was the world's oldest Yiddish newspaper. Historian of anarchism Paul Avrich described the paper as playing a vital role in Jewish–American labor history and upholding a high literary standard, having published the most lauded writers and poets in Yiddish radicalism. The paper's editors were major figures in the Jewish–American anarchist movement: David Edelstadt, Saul Yanovsky, Joseph Cohen, Hillel Solotaroff, Roman Lewis, and Moshe Katz.

Protesting against the injustices of the Haymarket trial, Jewish anarchists in New York formed the Pioneers of Liberty to support the defendants. From this effort, area anarchist groups resolved to publish Fraye Arbeter Shtime, which would become an amalgam of labor paper, literary magazine, and journal of radical opinion. The group held an annual December conference with anarchists and socialists, as well as events like the Yom Kippur ball. Interest in the paper mirrored Jewish–American interest in anarchism, surging in the 1880s/90s, experiencing its heyday in the 1910s/20s, and declining between and afterwards through its demise in the 1970s. The paper struggled financially in its early years and went dormant in the late 1890s. The paper thrived under Yanovsky in the 20th century's first two decades, with a high literary standard and circulation of 20,000 before the Great War. It retained its quality through the 20s under Cohen, but by the 30s, the Jewish anarchist movement grew more conciliatory, less revolutionary. The paper slowed its cadence from weekly to fortnightly to monthly before fading out of existence with the rest of the movement in the mid-1970s.

== History ==
External videos
- Free Voice of Labour: The Jewish Anarchists, 1980 documentary on Jewish anarchism and Fraye Arbeter Shtime's last year of publication

The 1886 Chicago Haymarket affair and the perceived injustices of its ensuing trial led to a resurgence of interest in anarchism, particularly among Jewish radicals. In New York, the first Jewish anarchist group in the United States, the Pioneers of Liberty, formed to campaign in support of the Haymarket defendants. Their work included production of Yiddish literature on the case. From early to mid-1889, the group ran the weekly Varhayt (Truth), the first Yiddish anarchist periodical in the United States and, technically, the first Yiddish periodical dedicated to anarchism in the world. The Pioneers of Liberty then proposed a joint anarchist–socialist newspaper and in consideration, convened a landmark first meeting of Jewish–American radicals from across the country at the end of the year. The proposal narrowly failed and the Jewish anarchists and socialists ultimately created their own publications. In January 1890, the Pioneers of Liberty and other anarchist groups resolved to create the Fraye Arbeter Shtime. The paper would claim to represent 32 Jewish workers' associations.

Speakers affiliated with the group toured the East Coast and Midwest to fundraise for the new newspaper. An interim periodical, Der Morgenshtern (The Morning Star), ran between January and June 1890 under the editorship of the physician Abba Breslavsky. Shortly after Der Morgenshtern's close, Fraye Arbeter Shtime first published on July 4, 1890, from the Lower East Side, and continued weekly for nearly 90 years.

Historian Paul Avrich described the paper's functions as manifold: "a labor paper, a journal of radical opinion, a literary magazine, and a people's university". Its coverage ranged from translated Johann Most and Peter Kropotkin essays to Yiddish poems on social conditions to reworked translations of major natural, social science, and literary texts, including Karl Marx's Capital and Ivan Turgenev's On the Eve. The newspaper also acted as a hub for Jewish radical activity. The group held an annual December conference in which socialists and anarchists met to discuss their joint movement, such as positions on organized labor and Yom Kippur balls. French anarchist Elisée Reclus visited in 1891 and encouraged the newspaper editors to open a libertarian school.

Roman Lewis became the Fraye Arbeter Shtime's first editor after the British socialist Morris Winchevsky declined. Lewis was a regular contributor, conversant in both Yiddish and Russian, and a convincing speaker and fundraiser. After a short, six-month tenure, he left for the cloakmakers' union and socialists in late 1890. The second editor was the essayist and translator J. A. Maryson, one of the few Pioneers of Liberty to become proficient in English. Third was David Edelstadt, a buttonhole maker from Cincinnati and among the first Yiddish labor poets, having published in Varhayt and Der Morgenshtern. He left the editorship in late 1891 after contracting tuberculosis and moving west to seek a cure. He continued to send the newspaper his poems until his death a year later. Hillel Solotaroff and Moshe Katz, who would later translate anarchist classics, served as editors after that point.

The paper's initial years of publication were dogged with financial issues. Foremost, the core audience—impoverished workers—had little money. The paper suspended printing during a typesetter wage dispute beginning in May 1892. Later that year, Alexander Berkman's prominent assassination attempt on Henry Clay Frick divided the movement, as some anarchists left the movement to denounce all forms of terrorism. As the wage dispute came to a close nearly a year later, the United States entered an economic depression, the Panic of 1893. By April 1894, the Fraye Arbeter Shtime group again stopped production, ending an era of Jewish anarchism as the Pioneers of Liberty and other groups waned or went defunct. In these dormant years, Fraye Arbeter Shtime editors assisted in the launch of the cultural monthly Di Fraye Gezelshaft.

Five years later, Fraye Arbeter Shtime revived publication in October 1899 and Jewish interest in anarchism rekindled with it. Its new editor, Saul Yanovsky, would serve through 1919, a heyday for both the newspaper and the Jewish anarchist movement. It was also a period of stability for the paper, with readership above 20,000 prior to World War I. Yanovsky's own column was popular for its wit, and he selected numerous talented writers with fresh views. Alongside Kropotkin, Most, and Solotaroff, the editor added Rudolf Rocker, Max Nettlau, Emma Goldman, Voltairine de Cleyre, and Abraham Frumkin. The paper ran translations of cultural works (e.g., Henrik Ibsen, Olive Schreiner, Oscar Wilde) and pieces by major Yiddish writers (e.g., Avrom Reyzen, H. Leivick). This selection made the paper both readable and alluring among Yiddish readers. The movement had also drifted from the zealous 1880s and 1890s in which social revolution felt imminent and propaganda of the deed justified. Yanovsky turned against terrorism and regarded anarchism as a philosophy of brotherhood, cooperation, and dignity, and the paper took a piecemeal approach to reform, in favor of libertarian schools and cooperative unions. While the 1901 assassination of William McKinley by an anarchist roiled Yanovsky, Fraye Arbeter Shtime bore part of the fallout, as an angry mob trashed the paper's offices and physically attacked its editor. Additionally, anarchist Jews also tempered their antireligious confrontation to be less pronounced, and some took up Zionism after the Kishinev pogrom.

The paper paid special attention to anarchist luminary Peter Kropotkin, who was especially popular among American–Jewish anarchists. Fraye Arbeter Shtime prepared a supplement with photographs from his second United States lecture tour in 1901, but Kropotkin requested its cancellation and that he not be made into an icon. The paper, together with Emma Goldman's Mother Earth, also planned a 70th birthday celebration for Kropotkin at Carnegie Hall in 1912. A special Fraye Arbeter Shtime issue highlighted Kropotkin's life and thought. The paper also followed Kropotkin in endorsing the Allies of World War I, as the only major American anarchist publication to do so.

Yanovsky stepped down from the Fraye Arbeter Shtime's editorship in 1919 after siding against Lenin in debate over the Bolshevik Revolution. By this point, anarchism had begun another decline that, this time, would not rebound. Post-World War I deportations and the Russian Revolution pulled workers to Russia and Communism, and there were fewer recruits, between immigration restrictions and the aging out of older anarchists, whose children had assimilated into American society. Fraye Arbeter Shtime subscriptions declined and the paper returned to its former, dire straits. No editorial committee was at the helm. A new Jewish anarchist federation, formed in 1921, organized social events and raised money from across the continent to reestablish stability for the paper by the mid-1920s.

Joseph Cohen succeeded Yanovksy as editor in 1923. The paper retained its same quality of journalism and remained a major source on American and international anarchist movements. The paper shortly ran an English-language section for readers unaccustomed to Yiddish. They also ran special supplements, jubilee issues, and English-language books and pamphlets by Nettlau and Berkman. Extracts of what would become anarchist Berkman's The ABC of Anarchism were originally published in the newspaper. Cohen founded the Michigan Sunrise Colony in 1932, leaving the Fraye Arbeter Shtime to a committee of Yanovsky, Frumkin, and Michael Cohn. Between 1934 and 1940, psychoanalyst and polyglot Mark Mratchny edited the paper. He covered the Spanish Civil War with exceptional interest but crushed upon the Republicans' defeat, left both the paper and the anarchist movement. The Jewish anarchist movement grew more conciliatory by the 1930s and less revolutionary. The paper kept good relations with other socialist Jewish unions, who also subscribed, helped to fundraise, and advertised during major labor holidays.

Over time, the Jewish ghettos and some of their hopes for revolution faded. Readership continued to decline, and Fraye Arbeter Shtime went from weekly to fortnightly to monthly. By the 1970s, its circulation dropped below 2000. The paper passed through several editors: Herman Frank, Solo Linder, and Isidore Wisotsky. In 1975, the printer Ahrne Thorne became editor and curated the paper once again into a position of standing in the Yiddish world, with articles on topics including economics, international affairs, labor, and literature. But these gains were short-lived. As the Yiddish-speaking population grew gray, many Jewish anarchist organizations dissolved. Fraye Arbeter Shtime held its last annual banquet in mid-1977 and published its last paper in December.

After 87 years, Fraye Arbeter Shtime was among the world's longest running anarchist journals and was the last foreign-language anarchist paper in the United States. By the time of its last issue on December 4, 1977, Fraye Arbeter Shtime was the oldest Yiddish newspaper worldwide. Historian Paul Avrich described the group as both playing a vital role in Jewish–American labor history and upholding a high literary standard, having published the most lauded writers and poets in Yiddish radicalism. With Fraye Arbeter Shtime went the Jewish anarchist movement in America.

Pacific Street Films' 1980 documentary Free Voice of Labor: The Jewish Anarchists covers the paper's last year of publication.

== Bibliography ==
- Avrich, Paul (1988). "Jewish Anarchism in the United States". Anarchist Portraits. Princeton, N.J.: Princeton University Press. pp. 176–199. ISBN 0-691-04753-7. OCLC 17727270.
- Rubenstein, Lenny (1980). "Free Voice of Labor: The Jewish Anarchists". Cineaste. Vol. 10, no. 3. p. 49. ISSN 0009-7004. ProQuest 222645451.
