= Sunrise Colony =

1930s American intentional community

Coordinates: 43.3°N 84.2°W

The Sunrise Cooperative Farm Community, also known as the Sunrise Colony, was a communal living experiment founded by Jewish anarchists on 10,000 acres of farmland near Saginaw, Michigan, between 1933 and 1936, during the Great Depression.
