= Joseph J. Cohen =

Russian anarchist (1878–1953)

Joseph Cohen
- Cohen in 1946
- Born: Joseph Jacob Kantorowitz; 31 August 1878; Russian Empire
- Died: 1953 (aged 74–75); New York
- Known for: Mohegan Colony, Stelton Colony
- Relatives: Joe Conason (grandson)

Joseph Jacob Cohen (born Joseph Jacob Kantorowitz; 31 August 1878 – 1953) was a Russian anarchist who co-founded and led the Stelton and Mohegan intentional communities, and edited the Yiddish anarchist periodical Fraye Arbeter Shtime.

Cohen was born on 31 August 1878, in the Russian Empire, in what is today Belarus. While young, he was pushed into rabbinical studies. In 1903 he immigrated to the United States. He settled in Philadelphia, where he became involved with the Jewish anarchist movement.
