= Ronald Creagh =

French sociologist (1929–2023)

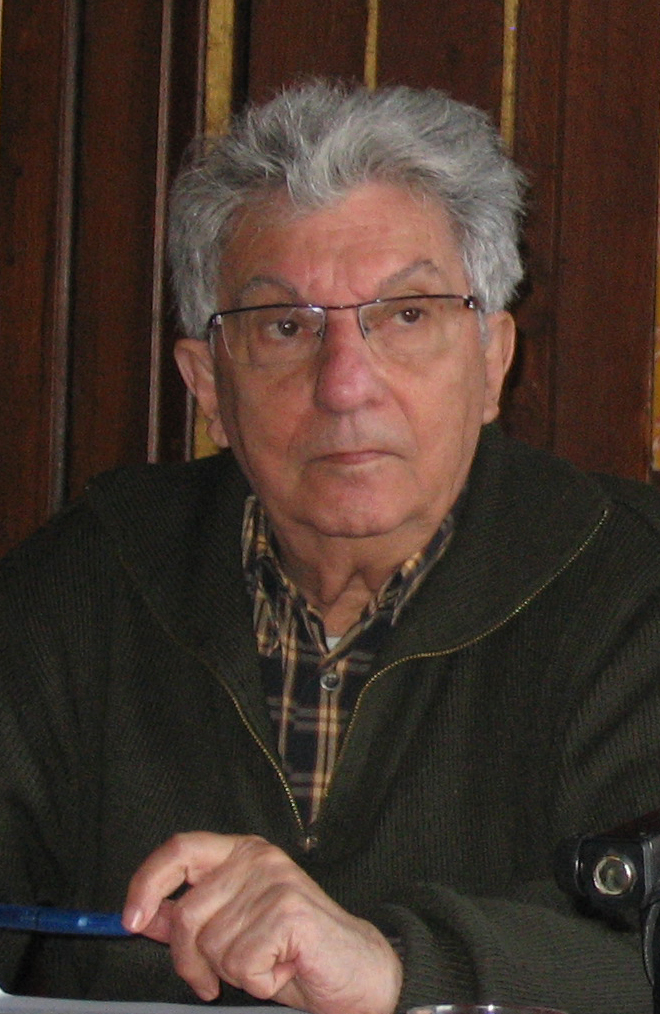
- Ronald Creagh taken by E. B-C. of L'Éphéméride anarchiste (2009)
- Born: June 19, 1929; Alexandria, Egypt
- Died: September 8, 2023 (aged 94)
- Occupations: Sociologist; historian
- Known for: Books on American intentional communities

Ronald Creagh (June 19, 1929 – September 8, 2023) was a French sociologist and anarchist best known for his books on American intentional communities. He was a professor of American civilization in Montpellier. Creagh died in September 2023 at the age of 94.

== Biography ==
Ronald Creagh defended his postgraduate dissertation at the École pratique des hautes études in 1967and his doctoral dissertation in 1978 at the Paris 1 Panthéon-Sorbonne University.

He lives in Montpellier, where he teaches American culture at University of Montpellier Paul Valéry. He manages the website Recherche sur l'anarchisme, has contributed to the journal Réfractions since its founding in the winter of 1997, and writes for Divergences, an international libertarian bimonthly online journal.

He is also a member of the editorial board of several journals, including Utopian Studies, as well as the websites Dissertations (“Theses and Dissertations on Anarchism”), Élisée Reclus, and Max Cafard, and the discussion lists of the same names.

== Works ==
- L'Anarchisme aux États-Unis, 1826–1886 (1981)
- Sociobiologie ou Écologie sociale by Murray Bookchin, translated from English to French (1983)
- L'Affaire Sacco et Vanzetti (1984, 2004 reissue)
- Laboratoires de l'Utopie. Les communautés libertaires aux Etats-Unis (1983)
- Nos cousins d'Amérique. Histoire des Français aux États-Unis (1988)
- La Déférence, l'insolence anarchiste et la démocratie (1998)
- Terrorisme, entre spectacle et sacré. Éléments pour un débat (2001)
- Shadows under the Lamp. Essays on September 11 and Afghanistan, co-author Sharif Gemie, Angleterre London :Freedom press, (2003) 101 p.
- L'Imagination dérobée (2004)
- Utopies américaines. Expériences libertaires du XIXe siècle à nos jours (2009), an expanded version of Laboratoires de l'Utopie and twice its length
