= Ori Kritz =

Professor of Hebrew language and literature

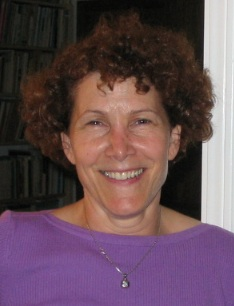

Ori Kritz (Hebrew: אורי קריץ) is an Associate Professor and head of the Hebrew Language and Literature program at the University of Oklahoma, a part of the Judaic Studies department. She is a multilingual writer and speaker, specializing in Yiddish, Hebrew, and Jewish literature and in Jewish and Israeli humor.

== Biography ==
Kritz was born and raised in Israel. She studied at Tel Aviv University, earning a B.A. in Philosophy and Hebrew Literature in 1981 and an M.A. in Hebrew literature in 1986, with Professor Uzi Shavit as her thesis advisor. Her thesis is entitled Up Against Gloomy Skies: On Mordechai Tembkin's Poetry. At Tel Aviv University, she specialized in both modern and medieval Hebrew literature. She later earned an M.Phil. in 1991 and a Ph.D in 1993 from Columbia University; both degrees in Yiddish Literature. Her dissertation, entitled The Poetics of Anarchy: David Edelshtat's Revolutionary Poetry, covers thematic, prosodic, rhetorical and ideological aspects of American Yiddish ideological poetry. She was advised by Professor Benjamin Harshav (Yale University).

Kritz has since taught at Emory University, Gordon College (Haifa), and the University of Oklahoma. Kritz is also featured in the 2005 film, The Hebrew Project.

== Publications ==
=== Books ===
- The Poetics of Anarchy: David Edelshtat's Revolutionary Poetry, New York: Peter Lang, 1997
- Sipurei hakibutz (The Kibbutz Stories). With R. Kritz. Tel-Aviv:Purah, 1997
- Bedarkei hashirah (In The Paths of Poetry). With R. Kritz. Tel Aviv:Purah, 2001

=== Articles and book chapters ===
- "Sifrut hakibutz" (The Kibbutz Literature). Lexicon of the Kibbutz. Tel-Aviv:Yad Tabenkin, 1998.
- "Bikoret atzmit-hevratit besipurav shel L. Shapiro." (Self and Social Criticism in the Stories of Lamed Shapiro). Iyun umechkar 6, 1999: 199-225
- "Prayers of an Unbeliever: On Temkin's Secular Prayers." Trumah December 2000: 99-111
- "Die Geschichte einer Wechselbeziehung: Zionismus, hebraeische Literatur und Kunst." (Story of a Dialectic Relationship: Zionism, Hebrew Literature and Art). With R. Kritz. Ein Leben für die jüdische Kunst. Gedenkband Für Hannelore Künzl. 2003: 195-214
- The Biography and Personality of Rachel (Bluvshtein). (Part 3 of Shirei Rachel, shirat Rachel, Rachel), Tel Aviv:Purah, 2003

In addition to the publications listed above, Kritz has made numerous contributions to the Encyclopedia of American Jewish History and The Encyclopedia of Jews in the Islamic World
