= Mohegan Colony =

Coordinates: 41.309°N 73.851°W

Mohegan Colony was an intentional community based on New York's Lake Mohegan in Westchester County from 1923 to the 1950s.
