= Mark Mratchny =

- מאַרק מראַטשני
- Born: Mark Klavanski; 1892; Grodno, Russian Empire
- Died: March 29, 1975 (aged 82–83); New York, United States
- Occupations: Writer, psychiatrist
- Years active: 1917–1940
- Organization(s): Nabat, Fraye Arbeter Shtime
- Movement: Anarcho-syndicalism

Mark Mratchny (Note: Mratchny (Russian: Мрачный) means 'sad' or 'gloomy' in Russian.) (Yiddish: מאַרק מראַטשני; 1892–1975) was a Belarusian Jewish writer, anarcho-syndicalist and a member of the Makhnovist movement.

== Biography ==
Mark Mratchny was born into a Belarusian Jewish family in 1892 in the city of Grodno. He studied at the cheder, and graduated in 1911 from the Russian gymnasium. He continued his education in Leipzig, Paris, and later in New York.

Following the outbreak of the 1917 Revolution, Mratchny settled in the Ukrainian city of Kharkiv, where he joined the anarchist movement. Not long after its founding in November 1918, Mratchny joined the Nabat Confederation of Anarchist Organizations and helped it to establish an illegal printing press in Siberia. He quickly came to clash with Volin, the Nabat's leading ideologue, over his formulation of synthesis anarchism, which Mratchny found to be "vague and ineffectual." As a member of the Nabat, he became an employee of the Cultural-Educational Department of the Revolutionary Insurgent Army of Ukraine (RIAU) and a distributor of the Makhnovist newspapers "Free Rebel" and "Path to Freedom".

In November 1920, Mratchny and other leading members of the Nabat were arrested by the Cheka in Kharkiv and transferred to prison in Moscow. When the first congress of the Profintern was held in July 1921, the imprisoned Nabat members staged a hunger strike in order to attract the attention of visiting syndicalist delegates, who protested their treatment to Felix Dzerzhinsky and Vladimir Lenin. By September 1921, the Bolshevik government relented and released the anarchist political prisoners, on condition that they leave the country. In January 1922, Mratchny, along with Volin, Grigorii Maksimov and Efim Yarchuk, left for Berlin. There he participated in the establishment of a committee for prisoner support, which sent relief packages and letters to anarchist political prisoners in the Soviet Union.

Following the publication of Peter Arshinov's History of the Makhnovist movement, Mratchny was among the first to lay out an anarchist critique of the Makhnovshchina. In the July 1923 issue of the Russian anarcho-syndicalist journal The Workers' Way (Russian: Рабочий Путь, romanized: Rabochiy Put', Mratchny claimed that the role of Nestor Makhno and his Insurgent Army in the revolution had been exaggerated, which had the effect of downplaying the role of the working class in building the new economy. He further accused the Makhnovshchina of militarism and anti-intellectualism, denounced Makhno and other insurgent commanders for displaying dictatorial tendencies, and criticised the unilateral executions by the kontrrazvedka. He concluded by criticising the free soviets, which he compared to the "informal state" proposed by the Left Socialist-Revolutionaries, considering them to have been un-anarchistic. Arshinov largely rejected these critiques by Mratchny, who had himself spent little time with the Makhnovshchina, and accused him of subscribing to Bolshevik hearsay.

In 1928, he moved to the United States, where he worked as a teacher in Yiddish-teaching schools of the Arbeter Ring system in Los Angeles and Detroit. In 1934 he became a Doctor of Medicine and a psychiatrist. In 1934, Mratchny was appointed as editor of the Yiddish newspaper Fraye Arbeter Shtime, but he resigned soon after the defeat of the Republicans in the Spanish Civil War and largely withdrew from the anarchist movement, declaring that he "felt like a rabbi in an empty synagogue." In 1975, Mark Mratchny died in New York, the last survivor of his generation of anarchists from the former Russian Empire. After his death, some of the materials from his personal archive were transferred to the Yiddish Scientific Institute (YIVO), which carries out research on the Yiddish language, literature and folklore.

== Bibliography ==
- Avrich, Paul (1971) [1967]. The Russian Anarchists. Princeton: Princeton University Press. ISBN 0-691-00766-7. OCLC 1154930946.
- Avrich, Paul (1988). Anarchist Portraits. Princeton: Princeton University Press. ISBN 978-0-691-04753-9. OCLC 17727270.
- Belash, A.V.; Belash, V.F. (1993). Дороги Нестора Махно (in Russian). Kyiv: RVC "Proza".
- Makhno, Nestor (2006). V. Danilov and T. Shanin (ed.). Крестьянское движение на Украине. 1918—1921 (in Russian). Moscow: ROSSPEN. p. 1000.
- Patterson, Sean (2020). Makhno and Memory: Anarchist and Mennonite Narratives of Ukraine's Civil War, 1917–1921. Manitoba: University of Manitoba Press. pp. 70–71. ISBN 978-0-88755-578-7. OCLC 1134608930.
- Skirda, Alexandre (2004) [1982]. Nestor Makhno–Anarchy's Cossack: The Struggle for Free Soviets in the Ukraine 1917–1921. Translated by Sharkey, Paul. Oakland: AK Press. ISBN 978-1-902593-68-5. OCLC 60602979.
