= Pioneers of Liberty =

Jewish anarchist organization

The Pioneers of Liberty (Pionire der Frayhayt) was the first Jewish anarchist organization in the United States. The group was known for its Yiddish-language publications and antireligious social events, such as Yom Kippur balls. Their club's model was replicated in major cities of the Eastern seaboard.

== History ==
The Haymarket affair of 1886 sparked nationwide interest in anarchism. On Oct 9 1886, the day of the trial's sentencing, about a dozen Jewish workers of New York's Lower East Side founded the Pioneers of Liberty, the first Jewish anarchist organization in the United States. What started as the work of militants soon attracted members who would become noteworthy speakers and writers: David Edelstadt, Moshe Katz, Roman Lewis, Hillel Solotaroff, and Saul Yanovsky. Alexander Berkman became another famous member. Many were in their mid-20s or earlier and together, their combined vim and oratory ability influenced immigrants of their neighborhood. The group was among the anarchist movement's most impactful.

The Pioneers first organized around the Haymarket defendants, circulating propaganda among Jewish workers on the Lower East Side. The group ran Varhayt, a short-lived Yiddish anarchist newspaper in the United States between February and June 1889. Together with the Jewish anarchist Knights of Liberty, which sprang from the Pioneers of Liberty, the two organizations together founded the long-running Yiddish-language anarchist newspaper, Fraye Arbeter Shtime, in 1890. The Pioneers of Liberty also published an annual paper, Tfileh Zakeh "Pure Prayer", which circulated during the High Holy Days between 1889 and 1893.

The Pioneers were defiantly antireligious. They eschewed religious tradition while retaining their secular Jewish identity. Beginning in 1889, they began hosting Yom Kippur balls, which featured blasphemous revelry on the holiest, most somber holiday, Yom Kippur. In this way, the Pioneers contributed towards a Jewish counterculture, with social events like picnics and concerts. The Chicago International Working People's Association, with whom the Pioneers were affiliated, worked similarly. In turn, the Pioneers of Liberty club was a prototype that would be replicated in other major cities of the Eastern seaboard.

== Bibliography ==
- Avrich, Paul (1988). "Jewish Anarchism in the United States". Anarchist Portraits. Princeton, N.J.: Princeton University Press. pp. 176–199. ISBN 0-691-04753-7. OCLC 17727270.
- Falk, Candace, ed. (2008). "Pionire der Frayhayt (Pioneers of Liberty)". Emma Goldman, Vol. 1: A Documentary History of the American Years, Volume 1: Made for America, 1890–1901. University of Illinois Press. p. 574. ISBN 978-0-252-07541-4.
