= Immigrants Against the State =

2015 book by historian Kenyon Zimmer

- First p/b edition
- Author: Kenyon Zimmer
- Subject: History of anarchism in the United States
- Publisher: University of Illinois Press
- Publication date: 2015
- Pages: 320
- ISBN: 978-0-252-03938-6

Immigrants Against the State: Yiddish and Italian Anarchism in America is a book by historian Kenyon Zimmer that covers the anarchist ideology practiced by Italian immigrants and Eastern European Jewish immigrants in New York City, San Francisco, and Paterson, New Jersey, at the turn of the 20th century. The book was published by University of Illinois Press in 2015.
