= Yankev-Meyer Zalkind =

British rabbi

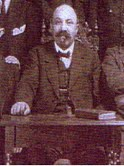
- Born: 16 August 1875; Kobrin, Grodno Governorate, Russian Empire
- Died: 25 December 1937 (aged 62); Haifa, Mandatory Palestine
- Education: Volozhin Yeshiva
- Movement: Anarchism

Yankev-Meyer Zalkind (16 August 1875 – December 1937) was a British Orthodox rabbi, an anarcho-communist, a close friend of Rudolf Rocker, and an active anti-militarist.

He was born in Lithuania, and both his merchant father and mother were both descendants of numerous famous rabbis. Zalkind was well versed in Jewish texts, and was a graduate of the Volozhin yeshiva, where he learned with Hayim Nahman Bialik. He also had a broad education and he was knowledgeable in over 20 languages and was able to write about a dozen with ease. He studied in western Europe and obtained a doctorate in philosophy.

In Britain, he served as a community rabbi in Cardiff and worked as an editor in the East End of London. Zalkind's early political leanings were as a Zionist, and was active in his attempts to help set up a settlement in Israel, and to that end studied agronomy in Glasgow. However, in 1916 he became an opponent of the war and returned to London to campaign as an anti-militarist. He became an anti-Zionist and wanted to create an anarchist society in Mandatory Palestine where refugees would be welcomed.

Rabbi Zalkind was also a prolific Yiddish writer and a prominent Torah scholar, who authored a few volumes of commentaries on the Talmud. He believed that the ethics of the Talmud, if properly understood, are closely related to anarchism.

== Biography ==
=== Family and early life ===
Zalkind was born in 1875 in the city of Kobrin in Belarus, then in the Russian Empire. Zalkind's father, Mortkhe-Yehude-Leyb Zalkind, was a merchant and an adept of the Haskalah, the Jewish Enlightenment who was said to descend from the Baal Shem Tov (the founder of Hasidism) and from Rabbi Mendele Don Yeḥia, a rabbi in Verkhnedvinsk who came from a prominent Jewish family in Portugal. Zalkind's mother, Khaye-Ester, was great-granddaughter of the rabbi of Lublin, Meshulem-Zalmen Ashkenazi, who was also from a distinguished rabbincal family, said to include Ḥakham Tsvi Ashkenazi, Maharshal, Tosefet-Yom-Tov and Rashi.

Zalkind was recognised as a “flam-fayerdikile” (child prodigy). He studied for two years at the Volozhin Yeshiva, where he became friends with a young Hayim Nahman Bialik, later a pioneering Hebrew poet. He was then permitted to attend the Russian gymnasium in Kiev, Ukraine. His earliest literary writing was published in 1900 in Ha-tsefira (The Dawn), Poland's first Hebrew newspaper. As a student, he was active in the religious Zionist movement.

=== Student years ===
Zalkind studied at the universities of Berlin, Munich, Geneva and Bern, gaining a doctorate from Bern in 1905. Influenced by the Hibat-Tsiyon movement, in Switzerland, he launched Zionist associations, kosher dining halls, a union called Kadima (which means "eastward", "forward" and "before") and, after the Kishinev pogrom, a self-defense group called the Mogen David, whose members practised shooting and marching in military formation. According to one contemporary there, he was

short, wide-boned, bearded, and had the gait of a bear. He wore a colorful hat on top of his head and a colorful sash in a manner similar to that of high-diplomats and kings. He wore lacquered boots and marched in a military fashion...

=== Britain and Palestine ===
Zalkind moved to Britain around 1903. He married (his wife was named Sonia) and became a rabbi in the small Jewish congregation of Cardiff, South Wales.

After a dispute with his community, he moved to London. According to Der Leksikon fun der nayer yidisher literatur, there he organised London's Aḥuzah society, dedicated to purchasing and settling land in Palestine, and renewed his friendship with Bialik. He visited Palestine in 1913, purchasing land at Karkur, near Haifa, to build a settlement for the Aḥuzah society's 70 working class members.

His wife sued him for being the “kept man” of a wealthy businesswoman named Pauline (Puah) Wengrover; after the marriage was dissolved, he and Pauline both took the name “Wengrover Zalkind” and had a child, leading to the religious authorities attempting to strip him of his rabbinical status.

At the start of World War I, he wrote an anti-war pamphlet with Y. M. Pozikov en titled Di milkhome un di yidn-frage (The War and the Jewish Question). He formed a Defence Committee to resist the Anglo-Russian Military Convention and edited an anti-war periodical Di idishe shtimme ("Jewish Voice"). Zalkind became close to the anarchist activist Rudolf Rocker. In 1920, after Rocker's departure from England, Zalkind revived his newspaper Arbeter Fraint, publishing it regularly until 1923. Between 1920 and 1923, the paper printed a series of autobiographical tales by his close friend Sholem Shvartsbard, the poet who later (in 1926) assassinated Ukrainian nationalist Symon Petliura to avenge the Ukrainian pogroms. It also published an educational supplement for youth titled Der yunger dor (The Young Generation) from 15 September 1922 to 12 January 1923. Both the adult and youth editions carried poetry, such as by modernists Peretz Markish and Leyb Kvitko.

From 1921 he was living in Harrogate in Yorkshire, where his wife ran a millinery shop. Zalkind never earned enough to support himself and his family.

Zalkind visited the United States in 1930, giving public lectures alongside various anarchist speakers. From there he migrated to Palestine in 1930, settling in Haifa, where he advocated for a Jewish national home built upon anarchist foundations. He died there ("in poverty and desolation" according to Der Leksikon) in December 1937.

== Scholarship ==
Zalkind is said to have learnt between twenty-one and thirty ancient and modern languages. His studies included grammatical annotations of prayerbooks, a linguistic analysis of the Biblical Song of Songs, and the translation of a Hebrew-Yiddish dictionary. His translations into Yiddish, Hebrew and Aramaic include work by Molière, Rocker, Aby Warburg, H. G. Wells, and the anarchist writer Sébastien Faure. In 1913, with Arn-Leyb Bisko, he edited one of the few Yiddish-Hebrew dictionaries published in the period, Milon male veshalem zhargoni-ivri. His unfinished projects included a history of the Jewish press and Di filosofye fun anarkhizm (The Philosophy of Anarchism). He was also said to have published over one thousand newspaper articles in Russian, Ladino, Hebrew and other languages. He also gave public and private lectures.

His translation of the Talmud into Yiddish took up more than two decades of his life. Four volumes of it were published, Berakhot from the Babylon Talmud in 1922 and three tractates from the Jerusalem Talmud (including Pe'ah, 1928). In his preface, Zalkind said that his commentary was built on those by Rambam, Reb Samson of Sens, Ovadiah Bartenura, Pnei Moshe, Yom-Tov Lipmann Heller and later commentators.

== Ideas ==
According to Yiddish scholar Anna Elena Torres,

In the early twentieth century, Zalkind developed a political philosophy of anarchism from his study of Talmudic ethics, retaining the particularity of Jewish identity and cultural autonomy within a vision of life liberated from capitalism, militarism, statism, and institutional oppression. His capacious politics dissolve the binary between religious conservatism and leftist atheism, anticipating the rise of the “spiritual Left” and critiques of political secularism. Zalkind drew political inspiration from the condition of diaspora, forging a theory of anti-statism from his experiences of statelessness. Rather than retrofitting secular radicalism or “judaizing” anarchism, Zalkind articulated his anti-statism through the language and logics of Jewish scripture while fiercely opposing contemporaneous anarchist strains of atheism, universalism, and antisemitism.

One of his contemporaries wrote:

[While many individuals hold many radical divergent views,] in all such examples, we are able to locate the central point of that person’s thought in which its roots burrow and from which its fundamental stem grows … Jacob Meir Salkind’s thought… had no such point. Rather, it had many centers at once … He was a man of contradictions who breached every boundary … or so it appeared to us; he himself saw no contradiction at all. For him, everything grew from a single stalk … He did not pass from camp to camp, from Zionism to Socialism and Anarchism, from Hebraism to Yiddishism, from faith to heresy, from piety to libertinism… Rather, he inhabited all these camps at once, he thought every thought at once, entertained every belief at once, inhaled every atmosphere in a single breath and perceived no inconsistency in it.

== See also ==
- Anarchism in the United Kingdom
