= Roman Lewis =

Russian anarchist and lawyer (1864–1918)

- Born: 1864; Russian Empire
- Died: 1918 (aged 53–54); Cincinnati
- Other name: Roman Louis

Roman Lewis (1864–1918) was a prominent Jewish anarchist in New York. Fluent in Russian and Yiddish, he was the first editor of the Yiddish-language anarchist newspaper Fraye Arbeter Shtime. For a time, Lewis was the Pioneers of Liberty's best speaker. Lewis attended gymnasium in Russia. In New York, when he wasn't working at making shirts, he spent his leisure time with the anarchist movement and spoke at Jewish union rallies. He later became a Social-Democrat, attended law school in Chicago, where he remained. He was elected an assistant district attorney in Chicago as a Democrat. Lewis committed suicide in Cincinnati in 1918.

After Alexander Berkman failed to assassinate Henry Frick in 1892, Berkman's cousin Modest Stein traveled to Pittsburgh to kill Frick himself. The police were tipped off before the attempt could be made, and Stein believed Lewis was the informant.

== Bibliography ==
- Avrich, Paul (1988). "Jewish Anarchism in the United States". Anarchist Portraits. Princeton, N.J.: Princeton University Press. pp. 176–199. ISBN 978-0-691-04753-9. OCLC 17727270.
- Tshubinski, Borekh (1956). "Roman Louis". In Niger, Samuel; Shatzky, Jacob (eds.). Leḳsiḳon fun der nayer Yidisher liṭeraṭur (in Yiddish). New York: Alṿelṭlekhn Yidishn ḳulṭur-ḳongres. OCLC 4421599.
- Weinstein, Bernard; Wolfthal, Maurice (2018). "The Jewish Unions in America: Pages of History and Memories". The Jewish Unions in America. Pages of History and Memories. Open Book Publishers. pp. 13–316. ISBN 978-1-78374-353-7. JSTOR j.ctv8j3sm.5.
