= Jean Grave =

French anarchist writer (1854–1939)

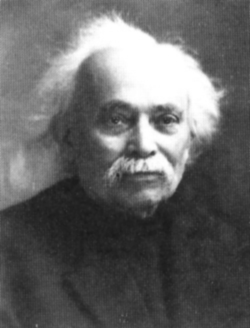
Jean Grave

Jean Grave (French: [gʁav]; October 16, 1854, Le Breuil-sur-Couze – December 8, 1939, Vienne-en-Val) was an important activist in French anarchism and the international anarchist communism movements. He was the editor of three major anarchist periodicals, Le Révolté, La Révolte and Les Temps Nouveaux, and wrote dozens of pamphlets and a number of important anarchist books.

Grave supported anarchism in the late 1870s, when it first began to emerge as a distinct movement. He was initially a supporter of Jules Guesde's Marxist-inspired philosophy. He attended political meetings in Paris before moving in 1883 to Geneva where he was invited by Peter Kropotkin and Elisée Reclus to be the editor of Le Révolté, which was renamed La Révolte when it moved to Paris in 1886. He edited La Révolte from 1887 to 1894.

In 1893 Grave wrote La société mourante et l'anarchie, prefaced by Octave Mirbeau, for which he was sentenced to two years in prison. Mirbeau, like Élisée Reclus, Paul Adam, and Bernard Lazare had testified on Grave's behalf, but to no avail. The trial only popularised the book, which was rapidly translated into German, Spanish, Portuguese, Italian and Yiddish. An English translation by Voltairine De Cleyre appeared in 1899.

Grave was acquitted in the "Trial of the thirty".

From 1895 to 1922 Grave was the editor of Les Temps nouveaux, which was influential in literary and artistic circles of the time. Many well-known artists (such as Aristide Delannoy, Maximilien Luce, Paul Signac, Alexandre Steinlen, Théo van Rysselberghe, Camille Pissarro, Kees van Dongen, Charles Angrand, Henri-Edmond Cross, George Willaume, etc.) illustrated and helped to finance the review.

In 1914 Grave joined Kropotkin in England, and incurred the wrath of anti-war anarchists by signing the Manifesto of the Sixteen, which supported the allies during World War I.

Grave also wrote Le Mouvement libertaire sous la IIIe république.

== Sources ==
- Louis Patsouras: Anarchism of Jean Grave. Black Rose Books, 2001.
