= David Edelstadt =

Russian-American writer (1866–1892)

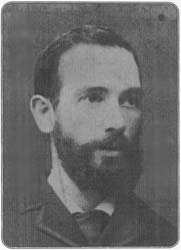
- Born: 9 May 1866; Kaluga, Russia
- Died: 17 October 1892 (aged 26); Denver, Colorado, United States

David Edelstadt (Yiddish: דוד עדעלשטאַט; May 9, 1866, Kaluga, Russia – 17 October 1892, Denver, Colorado) was a Jewish, Russian-American anarchist poet in the Yiddish language. Edelstadt immigrated to Cincinnati and worked as a buttonhole maker, while publishing Yiddish labor poems in Varhayt and Der Morgenshtern. He was editor of the Yiddish anarchist newspaper Fraye Arbeter Shtime in 1891 but left the post after contracting tuberculosis, moving west to seek a cure. He continued to send the newspaper his poems until his death a year later.

== Biography ==
Edelstadt was born on May 9, 1866, in Kaluga. His father, Moishe (Moses) Edelstadt, was a low-ranking policeman, and later an office worker.

In his youth, Edelstadt studied with a Lithuanian melamed for a short time. In 1873–1876, he studied Russian with a private teacher. At the age of 9, Edelstadt began to write poetry, with some of these poems later being published in the Kaluga newspaper Gubernskie Vedomosti.

In 1880 Edelstadt moved to Kyiv, to live with his older brothers. Here he met revolutionary populists and began adopting their ideology into his writings. Following the Kyiv pogrom in 1881, Edelstadt ended up in a hospital for pogromized Jews in Pechersk. Here Edelstadt met Dr. M. E. Mandelstam, who suggested that Edelstadt enter university.

Following his hospitalization, Edelstadt and his brother joined a cell of the Am-Olam organization, leaving Russia for a Jewish agricultural commune in the US. In May 1882, Edelstadt arrived in New York via London, and later settled in Cincinnati, Ohio, working as a factory worker.

While in the United States, Edelstadt continued to write poetry in Russian, eventually learning and writing in English as well. While in Ohio, Edelstadt became interested in anarchism. Edelstadt participated in the Pioneers of Freedom, the first Jewish anarchist group in New York which was formed following the arrest of the Haymarket martyrs. In January 1889, Edelstadt's first poem written in America appeared in the Russian Social Democratic newspaper Znamya in New York. In search of work, Edelstadt moved to Orange, New Jersey, then returned to New York. Here he began to write poetry in Yiddish, which was published in the anarchist Jewish newspaper Warhait. His writings have also been published in the London magazine Arbeiter Friend and in the New York socialist newspaper "Morgenstern".

In 1891, Edelstadt contracted tuberculosis, and he was forced to leave New York for treatment in the city of Denver, Colorado, where he died on October 17, 1892.

== See also ==
- Pioneers of Liberty
- Ori Kritz (researcher)
- Morris Rosenfeld American Yiddish poet
