= Pacific Street Films =

Pacific Street Films is a documentary film production company founded in Brooklyn, New York in 1969 by Joel Sucher and Steven Fischler. They have produced more than 100 films.

In 2004 the Museum of Modern Art hosted a career retrospective on Pacific Street Films.

== The Free Voice of Labor ==
Fischler and Sucher created the documentary film The Free Voice of Labor: The Jewish Anarchists in 1980 about the history of Jewish Anarchists in the United States. It focuses on the Jewish Anarchist movement that arose from sweatshop workers in the United States, along with their lives as new immigrants back then and their then contemporary retirement. The film's raison d'etre was the 1977 coverage of the closing of the Yiddish anarchist newspaper Fraye Arbeter Shtime. The film features scenes from Uncle Moses (1932); a Yiddish Language film about the labour struggles within the Jewish community in America. The film is noted for its use of music: collecting together various yiddish folk and political songs that interspersed around the film, including an early recording of In Ale Gasn/Daloy Politsey as a combined song.

== Filmography ==
Year	Title	Notes
1970	Inciting to Riot	Student film. Covers actions of Transcendental Students. Grand prize winner at the National Student's Association Film Festival.
1971	Ipimpi	Independent documentary about police infiltration of the Black Panther Party.
1971	Surveillance: Who's Watching?	An investigation of police surveillance of political dissidents around the country. Produced for National Educational Television. (clip on YouTube)
1972	Red Squad	An Independent documentary investigating the surveillance activities of the New York City Police Department and the FBI.
1974	Frame-up! The Imprisonment of Martin Sostre	Investigative documentary on the wrongful imprisonment of black activist bookstore owner Martin Sostre.
1975	The Marijuana Revolution	Thirty-minute investigative documentary. Produced for WNBC-TV.
1975	Politics and Police in Stamford	Thirty-minute investigative documentary. Produced for WNBC-TV.
1977	Voices From Within	A documentary produced in collaboration with a group of long-term women inmates at the Bedford Hills Correctional Facility, New York. Funded by the NYS Council on the Arts.
1977	The Grand Jury: An Institution Under Fire	An investigation of grand jury abuse. Broadcast on PBS.
1980	Free Voice of Labor: The Jewish Anarchists	Documentary on the last survivors of the Jewish Anarchist movement and the final year of the long-running Yiddish Anarchist newspaper, Fraye Arbeter Shtime. Supported by the Guggenheim Foundation and CPB. Broadcast on PBS.
1981	Anarchism in America	Feature-length documentary on anarchism.
1983	The Cancer War	An investigation into the politics of cancer research. Broadcast on PBS.
1983	I Promise To Remember: Frankie Lymon and The Teenagers	The rise and fall of Rock ‘n Roll’s first cross-over group. Broadcast on PBS.
1984	Man's Best Friends	A one-hour investigation of the use and abuse of animals in medical experiments and product testing. Produced for Frontline. Broadcast on PBS.
1984	Albert Szent-Gyorgyi: A Special Gift	A portrait of the Nobel laureate. Produced for the National Foundation for Cancer Research.
1985 - 1988	Salute to Newark; Take Me Back To Dear Old Newark	Produced for WNET's Metropolitan Division. Eight 30-second spots and a 30-minute historical documentary.
1988	First City	Produced segments for this WNYC magazine series on New York City: "Tugs," "Brooklyn Bridge," "Homeless," "Arson Squad," "Parking"
1989	United Nations Peacekeeping	Educational film produced for the United Nations.
1990	Blue Helmets: The Story of U. N. Peacekeeping	A look at the work of UN Peacekeepers around the world. Narrated by Jesse Jackson. 90-minute PBS Special.
1990	Martin Scorsese Directs	Profile of director Martin Scorsese on the set of Goodfellas. Produced for American Masters. Broadcast on PBS.
1991	Lincoln-Douglas Debates	One hour documentary on the students involved in the annual New York City debate competition. Broadcast on Thirteen/WNET in June 1991.
1991	Jessica Lange: It's Only Make-Believe	Profile of the actress on the set of Cape Fear. Produced for HBO/Cinemax.
1992	Oliver Stone: Inside/Out	Feature length profile of director Oliver Stone. Produced for Showtime and the BBC.
1992	Lincoln-Douglas Debates	One hour documentary on the students involved in the annual New York City debate competition. Broadcast on Thirteen/WNET in June 1992.
1993	Lincoln-Douglas Debates	One hour documentary on the students involved in the annual New York City debate competition. Broadcast on Thirteen/WNET.
1993	Peacemaking	Educational program produced for the United Nations.
1993	Calculating Change	Examination of the campaign to overhaul math and science education in the US Hosted by Al Roker. Broadcast on PBS. Produced for the Urban League and Thirteen/WNET.
1995	Schools For Sale: Advertising in the Classroom	A critical look at Channel One News, the for-profit service that brings advertising into the classroom under the guise of educational programming. Hosted by Lewis Black. Produced for the Walt Whitman Center for the Culture and Politics of Democracy at Rutgers University.
1995	In Search of Peace	Documentary special on the relationship of the United States and the United Nations, on the world organization's 50th anniversary. Narrated by Paul Newman. Broadcast on the Turner Broadcasting System.
1995	To The Ends of The Earth	A history of the American Museum of Natural History's fossil-hunting expeditions. Part of the museum's permanent display.
1996	Troubled Waters, Vanishing Treasures	Produced for the American Museum of Natural History’s Endangered Species installation.
1996	Final Take: The Fertility Scandal	An investigation of the scandal at the University of California, Irvine Fertility Center, involving the illegal use of unapproved fertility drugs and the theft of eggs and embryos from patients. Broadcast on Lifetime Television.
1996	Sidney Lumet: An American Director	A portrait of film director Sidney Lumet, photographed during the production of Night Falls on Manhattan. Produced for Paramount Pictures and Spelling Entertainment.
1998	Intimate Portrait: Jessica Lange	Documentary profile of Jessica Lange. Broadcast on Lifetime Television.
1998	Intimate Portrait: Pamela Harriman	Documentary profile on the life Pamela Harriman, socialite and former Ambassador to France. Broadcast October 1998 on Lifetime Television.
1998	The Warrior Tradition	Five one-hour documentaries highlighting warrior cultures throughout history: Samurai, Shogun, The French Foreign Legion, The Gurkhas and The Green Berets. History Channel broadcast.
1998	The Other Half ... Revisited	Documentary comparing social conditions today with those that Jacob Riis documented in 1890 in his famous work, How the Other Half Lives. Funded by the Ford Foundation and CPB. Broadcast on WNET-TV.
1999	Exploring the World of Music	A 12-part television series, with a study guide and 3-set audio CD package, highlighting the principles of music, seen through a world music perspective. An international co-production with primary support from the Annenberg Project of the Corporation for Public Broadcasting.
1999	Crime Stories	Three one-hour documentaries about notable trials from the past: The Jeffrey MacDonald Murder Case, Richard Speck: Born to Raise Hell, and The Trial of the Chicago 8. Broadcast on Court TV.
1999	From Swastika to Jim Crow	Independent documentary exploring the little-known story of Jewish refugee scholars teaching at historically black colleges before and during the Second World War. PBS broadcast 2001.
2000	Martial Arts: The Real Story	A two-hour special that explores a little-known world of secret martial techniques. From the mist shrouded hills of China to small backwater villages in Southern India, fighting techniques have been developed that require silent devotion, zealous commitment and above all, secrecy. Broadcast on The Learning Channel and ITV (UK).
2001	Speed Traps	This fast-paced, high-energy show takes an in-depth look at the history and technology of speed detection, and the equally sophisticated attempts at speed detection avoidance. Broadcast on The Learning Channel.
2002	Bravo Profile Nick Nolte	One hour documentary portrait of actor Nick Nolte.
2002	GoodFellas and JFK	Two productions for the AMC's "Back Story" series — Martin Scorsese's "GoodFellas," and Oliver Stone's "JFK." The programs take an intimate look at the story behind the story, revealing how these groundbreaking films struck a chord with audiences worldwide.
2002	The Economics Classroom	A teacher development workshop consisting of eight one-hour videos, website and educational materials. For Annenberg/CPB.
2004	City of Refuge	Installation piece produced for the Museum of Jewish Heritage to accompany an exhibition about Jewish immigration to New York City.
2005	Building Wealth and Risky Business	A series of educational videotapes designed to teach the fundamentals of financial literacy to High School and College students. Produced in collaboration with the National Council on Economic Education.
2006	In Debt We Trust	A Globalvision Production dealing with the widespread problem of why Americans are being caught up in the “debt trap” Joel Sucher produced the segment dealing with personal bankruptcy.
