= Hillel Solotaroff =

Doctor and anarchist (1865–1921)

- Born: 1865; Elizavetgrad, Russia
- Died: April 1921 (aged 55–56); New York
- Other names: Hilel Zolotarov
- Occupation: Doctor

Hillel Solotaroff (1865 – April 1921) was a doctor involved in the Jewish and Yiddish-speaking anarchist movement in New York. Solotaroff emigrated from Elizabetgrad in 1882. While attending medical school, he contributed to anarchist publications and gave public lectures. He was a member of the Jewish anarchist group Pioneers of Liberty and introduced the anarchist duo Emma Goldman and Alexander Berkman. Throughout his life, Solotaroff continued to write for various publications, including a daily column for the Yiddish-language newspaper Der Tog (The Day).

Later in his life, Solotaroff's views shifted to the right toward nationalism and Labor Zionism.
