= Anarchist Portraits =

1988 history book by Paul Avrich

- First edition
- Author: Paul Avrich
- Subject: American history, European history
- Published: 1988 (Princeton University Press)
- Pages: 336
- ISBN: 0-691-04753-7

Anarchist Portraits is a 1988 history book by Paul Avrich about the lives and personalities of multiple prominent and inconspicuous anarchists.

== Summary and publication ==
Anarchist Portraits is a series of biographical studies about the American anarchist movement written by Paul Avrich over twenty years. At the time, Avrich was the foremost scholar of the history of anarchism. He intended his vignettes to reflect the character of the anarchist movement through the lives of individual participants from the late 19th century through the 1930s. He draws from personal interviews and old periodicals across multiple languages. Some of the chapters are revisions of prior essays.

The essay's anarchist subjects are largely European emigrants to the United States, such as Mollie Steimer (from the Abrams free speech case) and Charles Mowbray. He also covers other Russian, Italian, and Jewish anarchist immigrants. Avrich also writes about anarchist luminaries who visited the United States, such as Mikhail Bakunin and Peter Kropotkin. Bakunin visited the United States in 1861 before the movement had momentum, while Kropotkin attracted crowds. Other figures include Alexander Berkman, Nestor Makhno, Voline, Ricardo Flores Magón, Gustav Landauer, and the Australian agitator Chummy Fleming. Outside of the United States, he also briefly touches Brazilian anarchism and Anatoli Zhelezniakov.

A new essay on Jewish anarchism in America covers the anarchist movement among East European Jewish immigrants between the 1880s and 1890s. It includes the working class movement in Jewish garment unions, the creation of housing communes and experimental schools, the Yiddish periodical Fraye Arbeter Shtime, and the influence of Kropotkin.

His essay on Sacco and Vanzetti shows the influence of the Luigi Galleani, an anarchist who avocated for violent revolt against capitalism and government. Avrich contends that Sacco and Vanzetti were part of an insurrectionary movement belied by the innocent image their supporters projected, but admits no direct evidence of their participation.

== Works cited ==
- Avakumović, Ivan (1990). "Review of Anarchist Portraits". Slavic Review. 49 (3): 453–454. doi:10.2307/2499997. ISSN 0037-6779. JSTOR 2499997. S2CID 164303759.
- Buhle, Paul (December 1989). "Review of Anarchist Portraits". The Journal of American History. 76 (3): 958–959. doi:10.2307/2936510. ISSN 0021-8723. JSTOR 2936510.
- Confino, Michael (1989). "Varieties of Anarchism". The Russian Review. 48 (4): 403–412. doi:10.2307/130392. ISSN 0036-0341. JSTOR 130392.
- Creagh, Ronald (1992). "Review of Anarchist Portraits by Paul Avrich". Social Anarchism (17): 40–44. ISSN 0196-4801.
- Dolgoff, Sam (1989). "Rev. of Anarchist Portraits" (PDF). Libertarian Labor Review (7): 38–39.
- Joll, James (November 27, 1988). "America vs. a Slip of a Girl". The New York Times. ISSN 0362-4331.
- McCarthy, Colman (January 29, 1989). "Brotherhood, Not Bombs". The Washington Post. ISSN 0190-8286.
- Miller, Martin A. (June 1990). "Review of Anarchist Portraits". The American Historical Review. 95 (3): 784. doi:10.2307/2164297. ISSN 0002-8762. JSTOR 2164297.
- Vecoli, Rudolph J. (1991). "Review of Anarchist Portraits". Journal of American Ethnic History. 10 (3): 79–80. ISSN 0278-5927. JSTOR 27500850.
- Wexler, Alice (1993). "Review of Anarchist Portraits". Labor History. 34 (4): 537–539. ISSN 0023-656X. EBSCOhost 9406150243.
