= Nine Lives of Nestor Makhno =

- Russian: Девять жизней Нестора Махно
- Genre: Historical drama
- Screenplay by: Igor Bolgarin; Victor Smirnov
- Directed by: Nikolai Kaptan
- Starring: Pavel Derevyanko; Ada Rogovtseva; Anna Slyu; Daniil Belykh
- Composers: Pavel Krakhmalev; Igor Melnichuk
- Country of origin: Russia
- Original languages: Russian; Ukrainian
- No. of episodes: 12

Production
- Executive producers: Felix Kleiman; Viktor Prikhodko
- Producer: Vladimir Dostal
- Production location: Ukraine
- Cinematography: Oleg Maslov-Lysychkin; Igor Primisky
- Running time: 51 minutes (per episode); 540 minutes (total)
- Production companies: DomFilm; Eurofilm-Service

Original release
- Network: Channel One Russia
- Release: July 2, 2007

The Nine Lives of Nestor Makhno (Russian: Девять жизней Нестора Махно, Devyat zhizney Nestora Makhno) is a 12-part mini-series which aired on Channel One Russia. The series is a historical biographical drama about the life of Nestor Makhno, a Ukrainian anarchist who was the commander of the Revolutionary Insurgent Army of Ukraine (Makhnovshchina). A 6-disc DVD set of the series is available.

== Plot ==
The series tells the story about the life of Nestor Makhno and his Revolutionary Insurgent Army. During the 1905 Russian Revolution, he joined the Union of Poor Peasants and carried out a campaign of expropriative anarchism. He was arrested and sent to Butyrka prison, where he received an education from Peter Arshinov before being granted amnesty during the February Revolution and released. His first steps were to organize communes in the Huliaipole region, later forming rebel detachments, which eventually grew into the Revolutionary Insurgent Army of Ukraine and played an influential role in the Russian Civil War. After it was defeated, Makhno fled into exile in France, where he would eventually die.

== Cast ==
- Pavel Derevyanko as Nestor Makhno
- Ada Rogovtseva as Evdokia Matveevna
- Lydia Obolenskaya as Nastia Vasetskaya
- Anna Slyu as Halyna Kuzmenko
- Daniil Belykh as Fedir Shchus
- Oleg Primogenov as Lev Zadov
- Alexandra Polovinskaya as Elena Mikhnenko
- Anna Ukolova as Marusya Nikiforova
- Igor Staroseltsev as Vladimir Lenin
- Arseniy Kovalsky as Yakov Sverdlov
- Yevgeny Knyazev as Leon Trotsky
- Sergey Romanyuk as pan Ivan Kazimirovich Danilevsky
- Natalia Soldatova as Vincent Ivanovich Danilevsky
- Kirill Pletnyov as Vladislav Ivanovich Danilevsky
- Igor Gnezdilov as Timofey Lashkevich
- Lesya Samaeva as Maria
- Vyacheslav Vasilyuk as Savelii Makhno
- Konstantin Kostyshin as Hryhorii Makhno
- Alexander Kobzar as Omelian Makhno
- Victor Andrienko as Mabel
- Vladimir Golosnyak as Yakov Slashchov
- Anatoly Gnatyuk as Andrei Shkuro
- Alexei Vertinsky as Pyotr Wrangel
- Alexander Bezsmertny as Anton Denikin
- Valery Sheptekita as Peter Kropotkin
- Sergey Gavrilyuk as Pavel Dybenko
- Stanislav Boklan as Vladimir Antonov-Ovseenko
- Nikolai Boklan as Demyan Zakharovich
- Lyudmila Smorodina as Alexandra Kollontai
- Valery Shalyga as Mikhail Frunze
- Fedor Olkhovsky as Lev Kamenev
- Sergei Kucherenko as Nykyfor Hryhoriv
- Igor Slavinsky as Peter Arshinov
- Sergey Boyko as Pavel Glyba
- Vladimir Kuznetsov as Stepan Trunov
- Sergei Siplivy as Isaak Matveyevich Shomper
- Anatoly Pomiluyko as father Dmitry
- Grigory Bokovenko as Gnat Pasko
- Maxim Bramatkin as "Mandolin" (Roman Savelyevich Kushch)
- Nikolai Oleinik as grandfather Pravda
- Sergei Strelnikov as White Guard
- Vladimir Andreev as Foma Kozhyn
- Viktor Saraikin as Sukhoverkhy
- Alexander Kochubey as Pavlo Timoshenko
- Leonid Marchenko as prosecutor
- Oleg Trepovsky as Kirill Ignatievich
- Valery Legin as Viktor Chernysh
- Nikolai Butkovsky as commandant of Yekaterinoslav
- Andrey MaslovasLisichkin — Sashko Klein
- Vasily Ivashina as Trokhim Boyko
- Alexander Zhukovin as Semen Karetnyk
- Vladimir Zadneprovsky as Leiba
- Vladimir Bashkirov as Yurko Chernigovskiy
- Alexander Ignatusha as Parisian taxi driver

== Reception ==
=== Critical response ===
The Nine Lives of Nestor Makhno received mixed reviews, with praise typically being reserved for the performance of Pavel Derevyanko as the titular Makhno, while criticism was generally focused on the series' lack of narrative structure and its poor direction.

Anastasia Krainer for Nash Film reviewed the series positively, exalting it for its historical accuracy. She particularly lauded Derevyanko's "soulful" performance, in which he "conveys Nestor's inner feelings, his passion, his pain, his eternal protest through gestures, intonations and glances. Sometimes it seems that he feels deeper, sharper than the role requires." However, she also criticized the series' direction, notably in a scene that featured Makhno and Pavel Dybenko drinking together, finding the performances on display "unbelievable". She concluded by stating that "this is not a masterpiece, but also not an empty glossy picture that has nothing to do with history."

On the other hand, the Russian Marxist Boris Kagarlitsky gave the series a negative review, criticizing the show's lack of narrative coherence as "events simply drag on one after the other in chronological order, without any internal connection, without any logic." He claimed that the show's writers had little understanding of the Russian Revolution, its causes and consequences, stating that "the [show] will tell you who won, but you will not be able to understand why. And most importantly, you will not be left with a sense of tragedy." He also criticized the casting of Leon Trotsky as the main antagonist, comparing his portrayal to "evil wizards" from children's stories.

Sergey Varshavchik for the Russian Journal was also critical of the series, pointing out its historical inaccuracy in respect to a fabricated sequence where Fedir Shchus murders Nestor's first wife Nastia, going further to attack it for its incoherent narrative and illogical set design; he also poked fun at the direction of the battle scenes.

=== Accolades ===
Award	Date of ceremony	Category	Recipient(s)	Result	Ref.
Golden Eagle Award	25 January 2008	Best Television Series	Nikolai Kaptan	Nominated	
