= Simeon Pravda =

Ukrainian warlord

Bat'ko Simeon Pravda
- Симеон Правда
- Born: Liubymivka, Katerynoslav, Russian Empire
- Relatives: Mitka Pravda (brother)
- Military career
- Allegiance: Makhnovshchina
- Service: Revolutionary Insurgent Army of Ukraine
- Service years: 1918-1920
- Nickname: "The Wooden One"
- Known for: Anti-Mennonite persecution and banditry
- Conflicts: Ukrainian War of Independence

Simeon Pravda (Ukrainian: Симеон Правда) was a Ukrainian military commander, known mainly for his persecution of the Mennonite colonists of Schönfeld, which preceded the Eichenfeld massacre.

== Biography ==
Simeon Pravda was born in the southern Ukrainian village of Liubymivka. He began work as a miner but later went to work on the railways, where he lost his legs in an accident, leaving him no longer able to work. He then became a traveling beggar, moving between villages by cart, along with his mother.

Following the victory of Nestor Makhno's insurgent forces at the battle of Dibrivka, in November 1918, Pravda gathered a partisan band around himself and occupied the Mennonite colony of Schönfeld. Pravda and his detachment robbed the residents at gunpoint, loading up all of their carts with money and valuables, before taking them back to Liubymivka. Pravda's detachment then lent direct assistance to the Makhnovists, attacking the Ukrainian nationalist positions at Zherebets on 20 November and capturing Makhno's home town of Huliaipole on 27 November.

Pravda returned to Schönfeld on 29 November and moved into the house of the Warkentin family, who had since fled to Molotschna, turning the village into their headquarters. Although their first weeks in Schönfeld were characterised by intolerance for the local colonists, the disposition of the Mennonites eventually softened relations between the two, with Pravda and his followers even forming friendships with some of the colonists. From Schönfeld, Pravda's followers carried out a series of raids on nearby villages, often killing innocent people that were known by the local colonists or publicly executing Russian landowners. As he continued raiding villages, Pravda began looting from their drug stores, which led to him developing a morphine addiction.

Following the New Year, which Pravda celebrated with the Schönfeld colonists, Viktor Bilash initiated an effort to bring Pravda's unit under a central political and military command. At an Insurgent Congress in Polohy, Pravda was appointed to command the insurgents' third front around Orikhiv. As Bilash considered him to be a liability, Pravda was mainly assigned to oversee the establishment of new units and hospitals, but never took up this post.

On 21 January 1919, reports started to circulate that a unit of the Selbstschutz was arriving to liberate Schönfeld, but Pravda's detachment defeated it in battle. On 26 January, the colony held a church wedding for a young couple, one of whom was a Mennonite and the other a Ukrainian that worked as Pravda's cook. Pravda attended the service and the subsequent wedding party, during which three guests were arrested by the insurgents. The arrested were transferred to a neighboring village, where one of them was executed and another barely survived. The third was beaten with a sword and subjected to a mock execution, after which he was allowed to return home.

The following week, after Pravda shot his brother Mitka during a drunken argument, the insurgent commander-in-chief Nestor Makhno ordered Pravda be arrested and brought before him in Huliaipole. But when Pravda excused himself by claiming he had shot his brother for insubordination, Makhno signalled his approval of the action and allowed Pravda to return to Schönfeld. By this point, Pravda had become infamous for banditry, with allegations circulating that he had fought against the Bolsheviks, who by this time were allied with the Makhnovists. He rejected the accusations in a meeting with his commander Vladimir Antonov-Ovseenko, claiming that he had personally executed bandits.

Following the battle of Peregonovka and the insurgent capture of much of southern Ukraine, on 24 October 1919, Pravda's detachment occupied the Mennonite colony of Jasykowo. Two weeks later, an anti-Mennonite massacre was carried out by the insurgents, who killed dozens of local colonists. By the spring of 1920, Pravda's renewed terror against the remaining colonists of Schönfeld forced the rest of them to flee to Molotschna.

== Bibliography ==
- Malet, Michael (1982). Nestor Makhno in the Russian Civil War. London: Palgrave Macmillan. ISBN 978-0-333-25969-6. OCLC 8514426.
- Patterson, Sean (2020). Makhno and Memory: Anarchist and Mennonite Narratives of Ukraine's Civil War, 1917–1921. Manitoba: University of Manitoba Press. ISBN 978-0-88755-578-7. OCLC 1134608930.
- Peters, Victor (1970). "The Insurgent Army, Its Membership and Operations in the Civilian Sector". Nestor Makhno: The Life of an Anarchist. Winnipeg: Echo Books. pp. 44–59. OCLC 7925080.
- Skirda, Alexandre (2004) [1982]. Nestor Makhno–Anarchy's Cossack: The Struggle for Free Soviets in the Ukraine 1917–1921. Translated by Sharkey, Paul. Oakland: AK Press. ISBN 978-1-902593-68-5. OCLC 60602979.
