= Makhno =

Makhno is a Ukrainian surname. Notable people with the name include:

- Savelii Makhno (1872–1920), Ukrainian anarchist military commander
- Hryhorii Makhno (1886–1920), Ukrainian anarchist military commander
- Nestor Makhno (1888–1934), Ukrainian anarcho-communist revolutionary and commander of an independent anarchist army in Ukraine during the Russian Civil War of 1917–1922
- Elena Mikhnenko (1922–1993), French-Ukrainian exile to Kazakhstan
- Vasyl Makhno (born 1964), Ukrainian poet, essayist, and translator
- Lesya Makhno (born 1981), Ukrainian-born Russian volleyball player
- Maria Makhno (born 2000), Russian chess player

== See also ==
- Machnow
- Kim Chwa-chin (1889–1930), sometimes called "Korean Makhno"
