= UM Press =

UM Press may refer to:

- University of Manitoba Press
- University of Massachusetts Press
- University of Michigan Press
- University of Minnesota Press
- University of Missouri Press
