= Halyna Kuzmenko =

Ukrainian anarchist (1897–1978)

Matushka Halyna Kuzmenko
- Галина Кузьменко
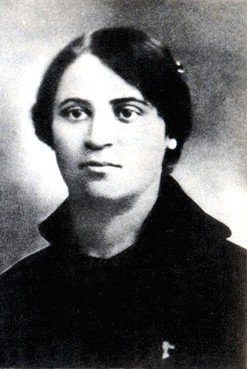
- Born: Agafya Andriivna Kuzmenko; 9 January 1897; Kiev, Russian Empire (now Ukraine)
- Died: 23 March 1978 (aged 81); Dzhambyl, Kazakh SSR, Soviet Union (now Kazakhstan)
- Occupation: Teacher
- Movement: Makhnovshchina
- Spouse: Nestor Makhno
- Children: Elena Mikhnenko

Agafya "Halyna" Andriivna Kuzmenko (Ukrainian: Галина Андріївна Кузьменко; 1897–1978) was a Ukrainian teacher and anarchist revolutionary. After moving to southern Ukraine, she became a prominent figure within the ranks of the Makhnovshchina, a mass movement to establish a libertarian communist society. Kuzmenko spearheaded the movement's educational activities, promoted Ukrainization and acted as an outspoken advocate of women's rights. Along with her husband, the anarchist military leader Nestor Makhno, in 1921 she fled into exile from the political repression in Ukraine. While imprisoned for subversive activities in Poland, she gave birth to her daughter Elena Mikhnenko, whom she brought with her to Paris. Following the death of her husband, the outbreak of World War II saw her deportation for forced labour, first by the Nazis and then by the Soviets. After her release, she spent her final days with her daughter in Kazakh SSR.

== Biography ==
On 9 January 1897 [O.S. 28 December 1896], Agafya Andriivna Kuzmenko, later known as Halyna Andriivna Kuzmenko, was born in Kyiv. After her birth, her parents moved to the village of Pishchanyi Brid, in the Elisavetgrad Raion of the Kherson Governorate (now Kirovohrad Oblast). Her father, a former farmer, worked for Southwestern Railways, before returning to farming when Halyna was 10 years old. In 1916, Kuzmenko graduated from the Women Teachers Seminary in Dobrovelychkivka and was subsequently appointed to a primary school in the small southern Ukrainian village of Huliaipole. There she taught the history of Ukraine and the Ukrainian language, as part of the newly-established Ukrainian State's curriculum.

=== Revolutionary activities ===
One of Kuzmenko's friends had warned her against going to Huliaipole, citing stories of a "bandit by the name of Makhno". In the spring of 1919, she met this Nestor Makhno and began a romantic relationship with him. By the summer of 1919, she had become his wife. Some accounts claim that their wedding was held at a church in Kuzmenko's hometown of Pishchanyi Brid, although Kuzmenko later denied that they ever had a church wedding. Like her new husband, who was commonly known throughout southern Ukraine as Batko (English: Father), Kuzmenko was also bestowed an honorific: Matushka (English: Mother).

Thereafter she became a leading participant in the Makhnovshchina, a mass movement to establish a libertarian communist society in southern Ukraine. Kuzmenko took part in the creation of the Commission for Anti-Makhnovist Activities and actively fought within the Revolutionary Insurgent Army of Ukraine as a machine gun operator. As a prominent female figure within the Makhnovshchina, she became a "tireless defender" of women and their rights, reportedly having personally executed a number of Makhnovists that committed rape.

Kuzmenko spearheaded the region's educational initiatives, which were inspired by the work of the Catalan pedagogue Francesc Ferrer. As president of the regional Teachers' Union, she influenced a number of teachers to join the Makhnovshchina, with a number of teachers from her own hometown even being executed by the Red Army for their Makhnovist sympathies. Her educational efforts were focused on the funding of these activities, organizing the education in the border territories controlled by the Makhnovists, the management of schools by joint teacher-parent councils, and the development of new school curricula. At the same time, efforts were made to feed the often poor school-children. Before the military defeat of the anarchists, the system was generally well-received by peasants, teachers, and the children alike.

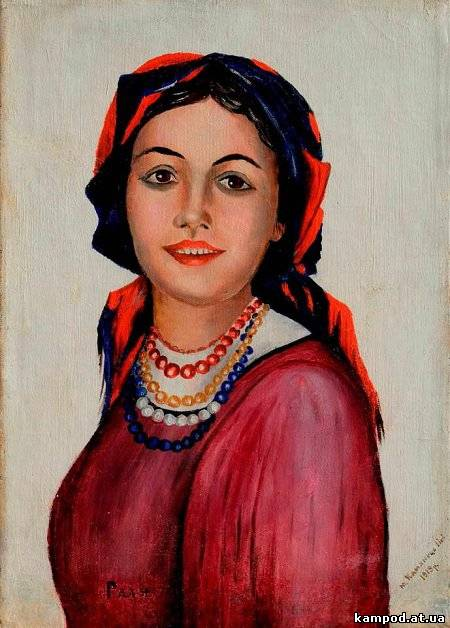
Painting of Halyna Kuzmenko, c. 1919

Kuzmenko also led a small group of intellectuals in promoting the Ukrainization of the Makhnovshchina, working specifically to increase the use of the Ukrainian language in Makhnovist publications and attempting to influence the movement towards Ukrainian nationalism. This group encouraged a brief rapprochement between the Makhnovists and the Ukrainian People's Republic in September 1919, while also taking a decisive stance against the White movement and putting forward a libertarian approach to national liberation. But following the discovery of a nationalist plot to overthrow Makhno and integrate the Insurgent Army into the Ukrainian People's Army, allegedly involving Kuzmenko herself, the Makhnovists turned against the forces around Symon Petliura and dislodged the remaining nationalists from the movement's leadership. Ukrainian cultural workers continued their activities within the Makhnovshchina, with Kuzmenko herself continuing her own Ukrainization efforts, but nationalist tendencies were decisively marginalized within the movement, as the anarchist theory of internationalism won out.

In the wake of the siege of Perekop in November 1920, the Bolsheviks turned on the Makhnovists, who were put on the back foot. During the subsequent period of guerrilla warfare, the Soviet historian Mikhail Kubanin alleged that the influence of Kuzmenko's "chauvinistic group" increased, with the Makhnovshchina gravitating more towards Ukrainian nationalism, while many of its anarchist ideologues began to exit the movement. Makhno himself rejected this charge, claiming that Kubanin had confused anarchist theories of autonomy with nationalism. While the American historian Frank Sysyn later rejected that Makhno had ever been a nationalist, he also disputed Makhno's own claims that Kuzmenko had not been a nationalist, stating that "it does not coincide with what is known about her." Isaac Teper maintained that she continued to espouse nationalist views until 1922, only losing her sympathies towards Ukrainian nationalism during her time in exile.

On 13 August 1921, Kuzmenko joined her husband and 100 cavalry in a retreat towards Poland. During the course of the retreat, they passed through Pishchanyi Brid, where she attempted to convince her parents to come with them. But they refused and were shot soon after by the pursuing Red Army. After a series of clashes with the Red Army, which left Makhno gravely wounded, on 28 August, they crossed the Dniester into Romania. They briefly stayed at an internment camp in Brașov, before Kuzmenko and Makhno were granted permission to move to Bucharest.

=== Exile ===
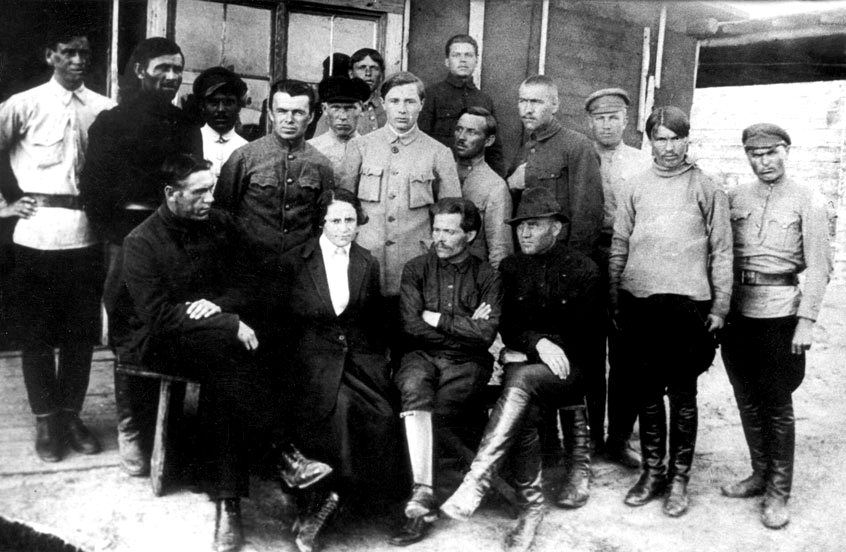
Halyna Kuzmenko and Nestor Makhno with 15 of their supporters, in a Polish internment camp

Following a tense period of negotiations between the Romanian and Ukrainian Soviet governments over the extradition of the Makhnovists, on 11 April 1922, they quit Romania and crossed the border into Poland. Kuzmenko, Makhno and 17 of their supporters were subsequently moved to an internment camp in Strzałkowo, where they were held for half a year. On 18 July, Kuzmenko went to Warsaw to request that the government allow their release, but she was quickly dismissed by the Ministry of Home Affairs. She then met with representatives of Soviet Ukraine, with whom she discussed their plan for the Makhnovists to lead a separatist uprising in Galicia, asking in exchange for money and support for the disaffected Makhnovist internees. On 22 July, she submitted a request for a visa to visit the Ukrainian Soviet capital of Kharkiv, while also demanding the release of all anarchist political prisoners, the end of political repression, and the extension of a number of civil liberties in Ukraine, offering the complete disarmament of the Makhnovist movement in return. However, these terms were met only with passivity from the Ukrainian Soviet government, which was attempting to entrap the Makhnovists into an anti-Polish conspiracy, hoping that this would subsequently lead to extradition.

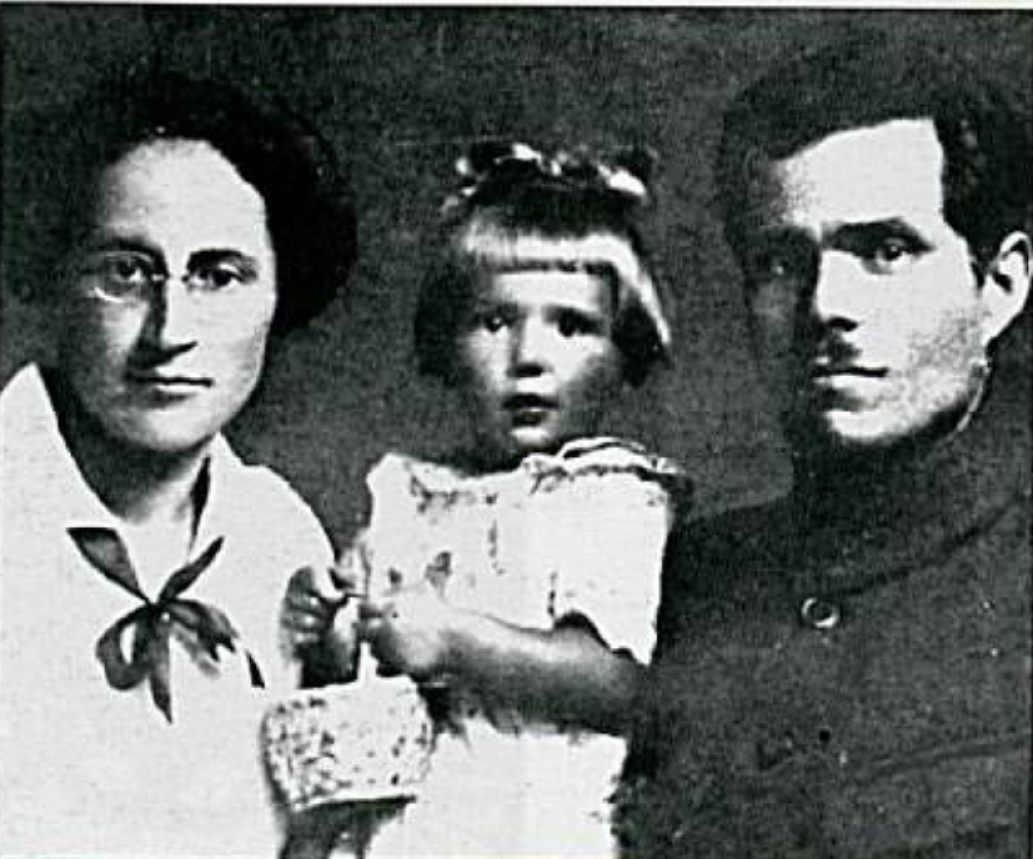
Family photo of Halyna Kuzmenko (left), Elena Mikhnenko (center) and Nestor Makhno (right)

French police file on Kuzmenko, Makhno and their daughter

Soon after, the Makhnovists were accused by the Polish government of plotting a Soviet-backed separatist uprising in Galicia and charged with treason. While imprisoned and awaiting trial, on 30 October 1922, Kuzmenko gave birth to her daughter: Elena Mikhnenko. The trial of the Makhnovists eventually resulted in their acquittal, to which Kuzmenko responded with astonished excitement. On 3 December 1923, the Makhnovists were finally released from custody and issued with residence permits, granting Makhno and Kuzmenko leave to remain in Toruń. They arrived in the city a few weeks later, first staying in a local hotel and then finding an apartment, albeit one with an expensive rent. The strain of life in exile, combined with their constant surveillance and occasional arrest by the authorities, led to a deterioration in Kuzmenko's relationship with Makhno. During this period, the couple frequently argued and Makhno even accused Kuzmenko of having had an affair with their co-defendant Ivan Khmara.

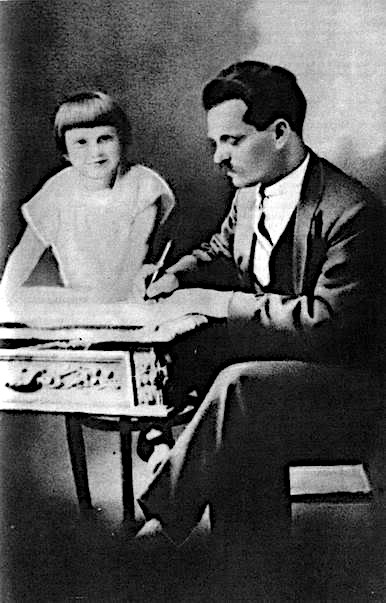
Elena Mikhnenko (left) and Nestor Makhno (right), in Paris

The family eventually moved to Paris, where Kuzmenko and Makhno worked odd jobs in order to make enough money to sustain themselves. In 1927, the couple finally divorced, with Kuzmenko leaving Paris to join an organization of pro-Soviet Ukrainian exiles, within which she made repeated unsuccessful attempts to return to Ukraine. By March 1934, Makhno's health had completely deteriorated and Kuzmenko moved him to a hospital, visiting him regularly during his final days and standing by his side when he died. She attended his funeral with their daughter, but she was reportedly too overcome with grief to speak. A few months later, she sent a letter to the anarcho-syndicalist journal Probuzhdenie, in which she defended her late husband from a defamatory article published in the nationalist paper Nova pora, categorically denying a number of charges against him and writing a brief biography of him and the Makhnovshchina. She also took care of the manuscripts for the second and third volumes of Makho's memoirs, entrusting them to an aid committee which in turn passed them onto Volin for publication.

Kuzmenko remained in France with her daughter until the outbreak of World War II, when they were captured by the Nazis and deported to Berlin, where they were used as forced labour. Following the Battle of Berlin, they were arrested by the Soviets and extradited to Kyiv, where Kuzmenko was sentenced to eight years of hard labour in Mordovia, on charges of counterrevolutionary agitation. In the wake of the death of Stalin and the Khrushchev Thaw, Kuzmenko was allowed to reunite with her daughter in Dzhambyl, where she worked in a cotton factory, living in the Kazakh city until her death on 23 March 1978.

== Controversy around alleged diary ==
According to Roberts Eidemanis, on 29 March 1920, a diary was discovered in the possession of Feodora Gaenko, who had been killed during a Red assault against Huliaipole. Dated from 19 February to 26 March 1920 and written in the Ukrainian language, this diary was attributed to "Makhno's wife". The document presents Nestor Makhno as an alcoholic and depicts cases of extrajudicial punishment by the Revolutionary Insurgent Army against requisitioning units, all told from the perspective of a woman observing the insurgent campaign first hand.

The document was found in Eidemanis' archives by the Soviet historian Mikhail Kubanin, who used it as a source in depicting a clash between violent peasant insurgents and urban officials. The document was dismissed as counterfeit by Peter Arshinov and Nestor Makhno himself, who instead claimed that the diary which had been kept by him and Kuzmenko was used for Arshinov's own history of the Makhnovshchina. But since Kubanin published his book about the Makhnovshchina in 1927, the diary has remained a key source in Soviet historiography of the Makhnovshchina.

It was only in the 1960s, during her interview with the Russian historian Sergey Semanov, that Kuzmenko confirmed the legitimacy of the diary. She clarified that she had begun keeping the diary, in a notebook she had been given by Feodora Gaenko, as her husband had wanted her to record a history of the Makhnovshchina. She also claimed that the diary had been seized by Red cavalrymen, who had stopped her and Gaenko's wagon, and that it later appeared in a Soviet newspaper – directly disputing Arshinov's denials. As to the contents, Kuzmenko claimed that she did not remember what she had written and could not attest to the accuracy of the events depicted in the published version, specifically disputing the characterisation of Makhno as an alcoholic.

The document's authenticity has been disputed to varying degrees in Makhnovist historiography. Vladimir Litvinov claimed it had been forged by the Cheka and that Kuzmenko's own admission had been a lie, in order not to bring her and her daughter under further scrutiny by the authorities. Sean Patterson disputed that Kuzmenko had any reason to lie, noting that Kuzmenko's account of the seizure of the diary differed drastically from that of Eidemanis, whom he accused of historical revisionism for the purpose of propaganda, detailing differences between the original text and the "falsified version" published by Eidemanis. Both Patterson and Alexandre Skirda claimed that the diary's authenticity could only be established through graphological analysis. Michael Malet also dismissed it as an unreliable source for specific events, due to a lack of corroborating evidence, while Colin Darch concluded his own analysis on the diary's authenticity by holding the text as a valuable primary source.

== Bibliography ==
- Avrich, Paul (1973). The Anarchists in the Russian Revolution. Ithaca: Cornell University Press. ISBN 9780801407802. OCLC 464080752.
- Chop, Volodymyr (2007a). "Галина Андріївна Кузьменко – голова Союзу вчителів Гуляйпільської республіки (1919-1920 рр.)" [Halyna Andriivna Kuzmenko – leader of the Teachers' Union of the Republic of Huliaipole]. Історія і культура Придніпров'я. 1: 128–134.
- Darch, Colin (2020). Nestor Makhno and Rural Anarchism in Ukraine, 1917–1921. London: Pluto Press. ISBN 9781786805263. OCLC 1225942343.
- Litvinov, V.N. (1990). "An unsolved mystery: the "diary of Makhno's wife"". Obshchina (43). Moscow: Confederation of Anarcho-Syndicalists: 6–9. OCLC 500195435.
- Malet, Michael (1982). Nestor Makhno in the Russian Civil War. London: Palgrave Macmillan. ISBN 978-0-333-25969-6. OCLC 8514426.
- Patterson, Sean (2020). Makhno and Memory: Anarchist and Mennonite Narratives of Ukraine's Civil War, 1917–1921. Manitoba: University of Manitoba Press. ISBN 978-0-88755-578-7. OCLC 1134608930.
- Peters, Victor (1970). Nestor Makhno: The Life of an Anarchist. Winnipeg: Echo Books. OCLC 7925080.
- Skirda, Alexandre (2004) [1982]. Nestor Makhno–Anarchy's Cossack: The Struggle for Free Soviets in the Ukraine 1917–1921. Translated by Sharkey, Paul. Oakland: AK Press. ISBN 978-1-902593-68-5. OCLC 60602979.
- Sysyn, Frank (1977). "Nestor Makhno and the Ukrainian Revolution". In Hunczak, Taras (ed.). The Ukraine, 1917–1921: A Study in Revolution. Cambridge, Massachusetts: Harvard University Press. pp. 271–304. ISBN 9780674920095. OCLC 942852423. Archived from the original on 23 September 2015.
