= Machnow =

Machnow is a surname. Notable people with the surname include:

- Emy Machnow (1897–1974), Swedish swimmer
- Feodor Machnow (1876–1912), Russian giant

== See also ==
- Makhno (disambiguation)
