= Nastia Vasetska =

Ukrainian peasant (late 1890s–1981)

- Настя Васецька
- Vasetska (first from right) photographed in 1977 by Viktor Yalansk
- Born: Anastasia Kuzmivna Vasetska; Late 1890s Huliaipole, Alexandrovsky Uyezd, Yekaterinoslav Governorate, Russian Empire (now Ukraine)
- Died: 1981 (aged 80–81); Polohy, Zaporizhzhia Oblast, Ukrainian SSR, USSR
- Spouse: Nestor Makhno (m. 1917; sep. 1918)
- Children: 5

Anastasia "Nastia" Kuzmivna Vasetska (Ukrainian: Анастасія «Настя» Кузьмівна Васецька; late 1890s – 1981) was a Ukrainian peasant, known for being the first wife of the anarchist revolutionary Nestor Makhno.

== Life ==
Anastasia "Nastia" Kuzmivna Vasetska was born in the late 1890s, (Note: In a February 1973 interview with Vyktor Yalanskyi, she said she was 76 at the time, which would put her year of birth c. 1896–1897; however, Kushnirenko & Zhylynskyi say she was 81 at the time of her death in 1981, which would place her year of birth c. 1899–1900.) in Huliaipole, Alexandrovsky Uyezd (present-day Ukraine). She was raised into a poor peasant family and was the oldest of three sisters. During the 1910s, she began writing letters to the local anarchist revolutionary Nestor Makhno, who was at that time imprisoned in Moscow's Butyrka prison. After Makhno's release in 1917, he returned to Huliaipole, where the two met and married; they did not have a formal church wedding, as Makhno was an atheist. They lived together on a commune, to which Vasetska and Makhno both contributed. However, Makhno's activism during this time meant he had little time to focus on their relationship.

Vasetska was eventually forced to flee Huliaipole after being threatened by Black Guards, taking their child with her. In early 1918, she reunited with Makhno in Tsaritsyn, after he had been forced into exile by the invasion of the Central Powers, and he found her lodging at a nearby farm. Makhno soon left her to continue his travels and they never saw each other again. Their baby, Sasha, died young, having suffered from a birth defect.

After hearing a rumor that Makhno had died, Vasetska found another partner. Makhno himself married Halyna Kuzmenko; according to Ivan Kushnirenko, their relationship was more romantic than the one Makhno had with Vasetska. In some histories of the Makhnovist movement, a myth circulated that Vasetska herself had been murdered by Makhno's followers. According to Kushnirenko, she never held a grudge towards Makhno, who himself also remembered her fondly.

In 1918, Vasetska returned to Huliaipole, where she found a living selling sunflower seeds. She lived in Huliaipole until she was 45. After World War II, when she was 48, she got married. She moved with her new husband to Polohy, where she lived out the rest of her life, and helped raise her husband's four children. There, she was visited by one of Makhno's descendants and by local historians investigating the Makhnovist movement. She and her sisters were photographed together in 1976. Vasetska died in 1981 in Polohy.

== Bibliography ==
- Darch, Colin (2020). Nestor Makhno and Rural Anarchism in Ukraine, 1917–1921. London: Pluto Press. ISBN 978-1786805263. OCLC 1225942343.
- Kushnirenko, Ivan (2018). Реформи Нестора Махна [Nestor Makhno's reforms] (in Ukrainian). Zaporizhzhia: Dniprovskyy metalurh. ISBN 978-617-573-148-2.
- Kushnirenko, Ivan; Zhylynskyi, Volodymyr (2009). Нестор Махно і повстанці [Nestor Makhno and the Insurgents] (in Ukrainian). Zaporizhzhia: Dniprovskyy metalurh. ISBN 978-966-2962-85-7.
- Malet, Michael (1982). Nestor Makhno in the Russian Civil War. London: Palgrave Macmillan. ISBN 978-0-333-25969-6. OCLC 8514426.
- Skirda, Alexandre (2004) [1982]. Nestor Makhno–Anarchy's Cossack: The Struggle for Free Soviets in the Ukraine 1917–1921. Translated by Sharkey, Paul. Oakland, California: AK Press. ISBN 978-1-902593-68-5. OCLC 60602979.
- Yalanskyi, Vyktor; Verevka, Larysa (1999). Нестор и Галина. Рассказывают фотокарточки [Nestor and Galina. Photographs tell the story] (in Ukrainian). Kyiv: Iarmarok. ISBN 966-95615-0-7.
