= Eichenfeld massacre =

1919 civilian attack by Ukrainian anarchists

- Part of the Ukrainian War of Independence
- Location: 48°03′59″N 34°59′02″E; Eichenfeld (now Novopetrivka), Ukraine
- Date: 8 November 1919
- Target: Landowners and their adult sons
- Attack type: Massacre
- Deaths: 136
- Victim: Ukrainian Mennonites
- Perpetrator: Revolutionary Insurgent Army of Ukraine
- Motive: Anti-German sentiment, class conflict

The Eichenfeld massacre was a 1919 attack against the Mennonite colonists of Eichenfeld by the Revolutionary Insurgent Army of Ukraine. Rising tensions between the native Ukrainian peasantry and Mennonite landowners had culminated with attacks on the latter, as insurgents took control of southern Ukraine and began carrying out reprisals against those that had collaborated with the Central Powers and the White movement.

In October 1919, Eichenfeld, a village of the Jasykowo sub-colony that had previously played host to a notable Selbstschutz detachment, was targeted for reprisals by the insurgents and local collaborators. The insurgents carried out a campaign of executions against the village's landowners and their adult sons, starting a series of anti-Mennonite massacres perpetrated by the insurgents until their defeat at the hands of the Red Army, which brought an end to the violence.

== Background ==
During the late 1780s, Mennonites began to emigrate from Prussia and Poland to Ukraine, where they established the colonies of Chortitza and Molotschna, under the protection of the Russian Empire. In 1868, the Chortitza Colony purchased some land from a member of the Russian nobility in order to provide more to its increasingly landless community. The following year, they established the sub-colony of Jasykowo on this land, which was about 50-kilometers south of Katerynoslav. According to the census of 1873, six villages had been established on this land, which counted a total population of 957. By 1910, the colony had diversified, as 461 Orthodox, 210 Lutherans and 61 Catholics were counted among the population, but all of these minorities were kept landless. By 1911, the size of the colony had grown from 8,012 to 10,621 hectares, divided into farms, each about 35 hectares in size, while a further 2,460 hectares was owned privately by Mennonite landlords. Local Ukrainian villages, such as Fedorivka, were brought under leasing agreements for access to Mennonite-owned lands in Jasykowo.

In the years leading up to the 1917 Revolution, some Mennonites even began to note the vast economic inequality between well-off Mennonite families and the neighbouring Ukrainian peasants. Anti-German sentiment also grew following the outbreak of World War I and continued after the establishment of the Ukrainian People's Republic and the seizure of power by the Bolsheviks during the October Revolution. Revolutionary rhetoric of the period stoked class conflict against the Mennonite landowners. Following the invasion of Ukraine by the Central Powers, many Mennonite colonists expressed support for the occupation forces, as it put an end to the expropriations by the revolutionary socialists. Although they were previously pacifists, Mennonites formed their own armed Selbstschutz detachments to protect their communities from further expropriation and violence. In some instances individual Mennonites accompanied Austrian and German units on punitive expeditions into Ukrainian villages. Despite protests by committed pacifists, by the autumn of 1918, Jasykowo had drafted 250 men into the Selbstschutz, including 18 in Eichenfeld, led by Heinrich Heinrich Heinrichs. Tensions between Mennonite settlers, Ukrainian peasants, and military forces increased throughout the occupation period and into 1919.

After an insurgent detachment led by Nestor Makhno and Fedir Shchus defeated the Austro-Hungarian Army at the battle of Dibrivka, the subsequent counterattack against the village of Velykomykhailivka by the occupation forces and accompanying German colonist units provoked fierce insurgent reprisals against Mennonites in the region. The burning of Velykomykhailivka acted as a catalyst for insurgent raids against Mennonite colonies. Makhno himself failed to prevent this escalation of violence against Mennonites. In one instance in 1919, Makhno threatened Fedir Shchus with execution for murdering German colonists at Silbertal, but did not take any further action on the matter. Despite orders from Makhno that any insurgents caught looting would be shot, the Mennonite colonies of Schönfeld in autumn 1918 were hit particularly hard during the raids, as insurgents confiscated supplies, burned down a number of the villages, and killed over 80 Mennonites. Schönfeld became the base of operations for Simeon Pravda, who used the colony as a headquarters for raiding surrounding villages.

Most of the Schönfelder Mennonites fled to the colony of Molotschna, where a number of them joined up with the Selbstschutz. By December 1918, anti-Mennonite raids hit Jasykowo, where the local Selbstschutz resisted attacks by units of the Ukrainian People's Army under Trifon Gladchenko and the subsequent Soviet invasion of Ukraine. The Selbstschutz then formed a common front with the White movement against the insurgents, but by March 1919, the Red Army, allied with Makhno, had overrun and occupied the Mennonite colony of Molotschna, where they engaged in a systematic purge of former Selbstschutz members, subjecting many of the villagers to cordon and search operations.

== Massacre ==
In the wake of their victory over the Volunteer Army at the battle of Peregonovka, the Revolutionary Insurgent Army of Ukraine initiated a counteroffensive that expanded the reach of the Makhnovshchina throughout southern and eastern Ukraine, bringing the Mennonite colonies of Chortitza, Molotschna, Jasykowo and Sagradovka under Makhnovist occupation. Before leaving Oleksandrivsk for the insurgent headquarters at Katerynoslav, on 5 November, Makhno issued a citizens' address in The Road to Freedom which called for the death of the "bourgeoisie". The address circulated among the rank-and-file of the insurgent army at a time when attacks against Mennonites were already intensifying, as the insurgents rapidly embraced the new campaign of terror. On the same day as the address was published, one Mennonite called Dietrich Neufeld wrote in his diary of the increasingly dangerous environment in the colonies:

We feel as if we have been condemned to death and are now simply waiting for the executioner to come. Those who are not sunk in apathy are thinking of escape. But we have been notified that anyone caught three steps from his house will be shot without warning. Actually there are so many armed riders around that any attempt to escape would mean certain death.

One of the Mennonite settlements that came under attack from the Makhnovists was Eichenfeld (Russian: Дубовка, romanized: Dubovka), a village of 306 people, not far from the Ukrainian village of Fedorivka. Tensions over land rights between the native Ukrainians and Mennonite settlers had reached a boiling point, with some Ukrainians from neighboring Lukaschowo even attempting to warn the Eichenfelders of an impending premeditated attack by the insurgent forces and sympathetic local peasants.

On 8 November 1919, thousands of insurgent troops passed through the Jasykowo colony, on their way to Katerynoslav. At 10am, a number of the insurgents stopped in Eichenfeld, where they assassinated Heinrich Kornelius Heinrichs, the father of the local Selbstschutz leader. That same afternoon, the insurgents then targeted six tent missionaries that were preaching in the village. Despite having been granted permission to carry out their evangelical mission by Makhno himself, these Shtundists had been identified by the insurgents as "servants of Capital" and were subsequently murdered. By 4pm, the violence had largely abated, but after the sunset, the insurgents returned.

That night, an insurgent cavalry squadron surrounded Eichenfeld and attacked its inhabitants. Going from door-to-door, the insurgents executed the village's landowners and their adult sons. After interrogating them about their property holdings, those that were found to own land were systematically murdered, while the landless peasants were left alive. The insurgents appeared to be under orders to specifically target landowning men, in an attempt to eliminate Mennonite property claims and the possibility of inheritance. After the men were dispensed with, the insurgents then raped many of the women and girls that were left over, infecting them with a number of venereal diseases. The exact number of rapes that occurred during the massacre are not known, in part due to the stigma associated with sexual assault and the trauma involved in recounting the experience.

Houses were burnt down and belongings looted before the insurgents left the village, where 75 people had been killed, while 61 more people were killed in the surrounding area. After the massacre was over, Ukrainian peasants from nearby villages took part in the looting, reportedly even taking the doors and windows off buildings. Survivors of the massacre fled to Adelsheim, a neighboring Mennonite village. They stayed there until 11 November, when some returned to Eichenfeld and buried their dead in unmarked graves. Some survivors indicated a belief that the prior actions of the Eichenfeld Selbstschutz had motivated the perpetrators of the massacre, who desired to carry out retribution for attacks against one of their bands.

Between 8 November and 18 December 1919, 827 Mennonites were murdered in the insurgent-occupied colonies, accounting for two-thirds of all Mennonites murdered during the war. Further massacres were documented at Blumenort, in Sagradowka, where insurgents indiscriminately killed over 200 Mennonite men, women and children, and Borosenko, where no Selbstschutz unit had ever been present. The massacres were finally brought to an end in 1920, after the defeat of the insurgents and subsequent conquest of Ukraine by the Red Army, but hundreds more Mennonites would starve to death during the famine of 1921–1922 that followed.

== Historiography ==
Mennonite historiography has attributed responsibility for the massacre to Nestor Makhno, the commander-in-chief of the Revolutionary Insurgent Army, while Makhnovist historiography has paid little attention to any of the insurgent massacres against the Mennonites. Analysis of first-hand sources have found no evidence of direct involvement in the massacre by Makhno himself, who at the time was stationed in Katerynoslav, which was under siege by the Whites. Makhnovist historiography would go onto characterise these attacks as a symptom of class conflict.

== See also ==
- Flight and expulsion of Germans (1944–1950)
- NKVD Order No. 00439
- Persecution of Christians in the Soviet Union
- Pogroms of the Russian Civil War

== Bibliography ==
- Enns, Elaine L. (2016). "Trauma and Memory: Challenges to Settler Solidarity". Consensus. 37 (1): 1–11. doi:10.51644/CSGX4934. ISSN 2369-2685. OCLC 8091286427.
- Letkemann, Peter (1998). "Mennonite Victims of Revolution, Anarchy, Civil War, Disease and Famine, 1917–1923". Mennonite Historian. XXIV (2). Winnipeg: Centre for Mennonite Brethren Studies. ISSN 0700-8066. OCLC 1080285067. Archived from the original on 18 November 2005.
- Neufeldt, Colin Peter (1999). The fate of Mennonites in Ukraine and the Crimea during Soviet collectivization and the famine (1930–1933) (PhD). Edmonton: University of Alberta. doi:10.7939/R3K35MN8W. ISBN 9780612395749. OCLC 1006906816.
- Patterson, Sean (2020). Makhno and Memory: Anarchist and Mennonite Narratives of Ukraine's Civil War, 1917–1921. Manitoba: University of Manitoba Press. ISBN 978-0-88755-578-7. OCLC 1134608930.
- Urry, James (2006). Mennonites, Politics, and Peoplehood. Winnipeg: University of Manitoba Press. ISBN 0887556884. OCLC 243613891.
