= The Anarchism of Nestor Makhno, 1918–1921 =

1976 book-length study of Nestor Makhno written by Michael Palij

- First edition
- Author: Michael Palij
- Published: 1976 (University of Washington Press)
- Pages: 428
- ISBN: 978-0-295-95511-7

The Anarchism of Nestor Makhno, 1918–1921 is a book-length study of Nestor Makhno written by Michael Palij and published by the University of Washington Press in 1976.
