= Nestor Makhno =

Ukrainian anarchist revolutionary (1888–1934)

Bat'ko Nestor Makhno
- Нестор Махно
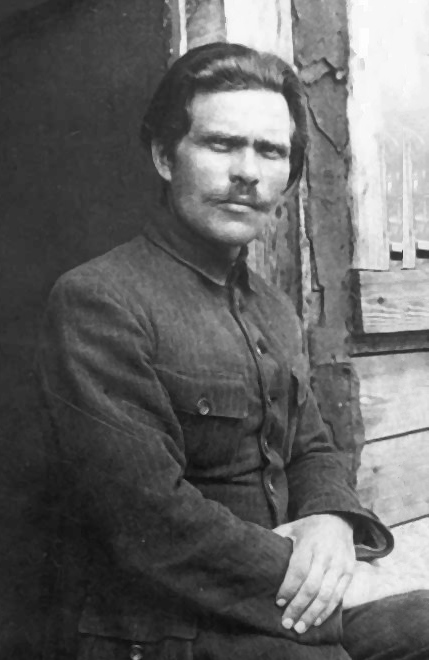
- Makhno in 1921

Otaman of the Makhnovshchina
- In office 30 September 1918 – 28 August 1921
- Preceded by: Position established
- Succeeded by: Viktor Bilash

Chairman of the Military Revolutionary Council
- In office 27 July 1919 – 1 September 1919
- Preceded by: Ivan Chernoknizhny
- Succeeded by: Volin

Personal details
- Born: 7 November [O.S. 26 October] 1888 Huliaipole, Russian Empire (now in Ukraine)
- Died: 25 July 1934 (aged 45) Paris, France
- Spouses: Nastia Vasetska (m. 1917–1918) Halyna Kuzmenko (m. 1918–1934)
- Children: 2, including Elena Mikhnenko

Military service
- Allegiance: Black Guards (1917-1918); Makhnovshchina (1918-1921); Ukrainian SSR (1919)
- Commander: Black Guards (1917–1918); Revolutionary Insurgent Army of Ukraine (1918–1921); Ukrainian Soviet Army (February–June 1919)
- Years of service: 1917–1921
- Rank: Otaman (RIAU); Division commander (Red Army)
- Commands: Huliaipole detachment (1917–1918); Revolutionary Insurgent Army of Ukraine (1918–1921); 3rd Trans-Dnepr Brigade (February–April 1919); 7th Ukrainian Soviet Division (April–June 1919)

Nestor Ivanovych Makhno (Note: The surname "Makhno" was itself a corruption of his father's surname "Mikhnenko" (Міхненко).) (Ukrainian: Не́стор Іва́нович Махно́, pronounced [ˈnɛstor iˈwɑnowɪtʃ mɐxˈnɔ]; Russian: Не́стор Ива́нович Махно́; 7 November 1888 – 25 July 1934), also known as Bat'ko Makhno (Ukrainian: Ба́тько Махно́ [ˈbɑtʲko mɐxˈnɔ], lit. 'Father Makhno'), (Note: According to Alexandre Skirda, the term Bat'ko had been used by the Zaporozhian Cossacks as an honorific for elected military leaders. As Makhno was still quite young when he was given the name Bat'ko by his detachment, the literal translation of "father" may not be entirely accurate, as the term is not exclusively used in a paternal sense. Makhno was also not the only person with the title of Bat'ko in Ukraine, there were even some other Bat'kos within the ranks of the Makhnovshchina.) was a Ukrainian anarchist revolutionary and the commander of the Revolutionary Insurgent Army of Ukraine during the Ukrainian War of Independence. He established the Makhnovshchina (loosely translated as "Makhno movement"), a mass movement by the Ukrainian peasantry to establish anarchist communism in the country between 1918 and 1921. Initially centered around Makhno's home province of Katerynoslav and hometown of Huliaipole, it came to exert a strong influence over large areas of southern Ukraine, specifically in what is now the Zaporizhzhia Oblast of Ukraine. Anarchists have cited him as an inspiration during his life and into today.

Raised by a peasant family and coming of age amid the fervor around the 1905 revolution against the autocratic rule of Russian Emperor Nicholas II, Makhno was a member of the Union of Poor Peasants, a local anarchist group, and spent seven years imprisoned for that. With his release during the 1917 Revolution, Makhno became a local revolutionary leader in his hometown and oversaw the expropriation and redistribution of large estates to the peasantry. In the Russian Civil War, Makhno sided with the Soviet Russian Bolsheviks against the Ukrainian nationalists and White movement, but his alliances with the Bolsheviks did not last. He rallied Bolshevik support to lead an insurgency, defeating the Central Powers' occupation forces at the Battle of Dibrivka and establishing the Makhnovshchina. Makhno's troops briefly integrated with the Bolshevik Red Army in the 1919 Soviet invasion of Ukraine, but split over differences on the movement's autonomy. Makhno rebuilt his army from the remains of Nykyfor Hryhoriv's forces in western Ukraine, routed the White Army at the Battle of Perehonivka, and captured most of southern and eastern Ukraine, where they again attempted to establish anarchist communism.

Makhno's army fought the Bolshevik re-invasion of Ukraine in 1920 until a White Army offensive forced a short-lived Bolshevik–Makhnovist alliance that drove the Whites out of Crimea and ended the Southern Front of the Russian Civil War. The Bolsheviks immediately turned on Makhno, wounding him and driving him westward in August 1921 to Romanian internment camps, Poland, and Europe, before he settled in Paris with his wife and daughter. Makhno wrote memoirs and articles for radical newspapers, playing a role in the development of platformism.

He later became alienated from the French anarchist movement. His family continued to be persecuted in the decades following his death of tuberculosis at the age of 45.

== Early life ==
Nestor Ivanovych Makhno was born on 7 November [O.S. 26 October] 1888 (Note: Other sources have listed Makhno's birth year as being in 1889, with the Great Soviet Encyclopedia listing it 1884, but Church records indicate 1888 as his true birth year. It is possible that even he himself did not know his correct birth date.) into a poor peasant family in Huliaipole, a town then in the Katerynoslav Governorate of the Russian Empire and now in Ukraine. He was the youngest of five children born to Ivan and Evdokia Mikhnenko, former serfs who had been emancipated in 1861. After Makhno's birth, Ivan went to work as a coachman for a wealthy industrialist when the family's small plot of land could not feed them. He died when Makhno was only ten months old, leaving behind his impoverished family.

Makhno was briefly fostered by a more well-off peasant couple. Unhappy with them, he returned to his family of birth. At only seven years old, he was put to work tending livestock. Makhno started to attend a local secular school when he turned eight years old. He was a good student at first but grew to skip school to play games and ice skate. Makhno worked at a local estate in the summer after his first school year. His brothers (Note: Makhno's brothers also went on to become anarchists and active partisans of the Makhnovist movement. In 1918, Omelian was executed by the Austro-Hungarian Army; in September 1919, Hryhorii was killed in Uman by the Volunteer Army; and in February 1920, Savelii was killed by the Red Army in Huliaipole.) also worked as farmhands to support the family. While working at a vineyard owned by a Bulgarian family, he learned how to speak Bulgarian, and would later be able to give speeches in the language.

Makhno attended one more year of school before his family's extreme poverty forced the ten-year-old to work the fields full-time, which led him to develop a "sort of rage, resentment, even hatred for the wealthy property-owner". His aversion to the landlords grew, nurtured by Evdokia's stories of her time in serfdom. In 1902, he observed a farm manager and the landlord's sons physically beating a young farmhand. He quickly alerted Bat'ko Ivan, an older stable hand who attacked the assailants and led a spontaneous workers' revolt against the landlord. After the affair was settled, Ivan left Makhno with words that would inspire a rebellious spirit within him: "if one of your masters should ever strike you, pick up the first pitchfork you lay hands on and let him have it..." The following year, Makhno quit working in the fields and found a job in a foundry. By this time, most of his brothers had left home and started their own families. Makhno rapidly moved between jobs, focusing most of his work on Evdokia's land while occasionally returning to employment to help provide for his brothers.

== Revolutionary activity ==
When the 1905 revolution broke out, the sixteen-year-old Makhno quickly joined the revolutionary movement. He distributed propaganda for the Social Democratic Labor Party before affiliating with his home town's local anarchist communist group, the Union of Poor Peasants. Despite increased political repression against revolutionaries, the Union continued to meet weekly, and inspired Makhno to devote himself to the revolution. Makhno was initially distrusted by other members of the group due to his apparent penchant for drinking and getting into fights. After six months in the Union of Poor Peasants, Makhno had thoroughly educated himself on the principles of libertarian communism and became a formal member.

A series of agrarian reforms disempowered the traditional peasant communes by creating a wealthier land-owning class and growing private estates. In response, the Union of Poor Peasants initiated a campaign of "Black Terror" against the large landowners and the local Tsarist police. The group carried out a series of expropriations against local businessmen, using the money they stole to print propaganda that attacked the recent reforms. Suspected of being involved in these attacks, with Nazarii Zuichenko naming him as a participant in an attack on a post office cart, Makhno was arrested in September 1907 but was eventually released without charges due to a lack of evidence. As the rest of the group's members had been declared outlaws by the Tsarist authorities, Makhno founded another anarchist study group in a neighboring village, where two dozen members gathered on a weekly basis to discuss anarchist theory. But after the assassination of a police informant by the Union of Poor Peasants, the police launched a crackdown against the group and arrested many of its members, including Makhno in August 1909.

=== Imprisonment ===
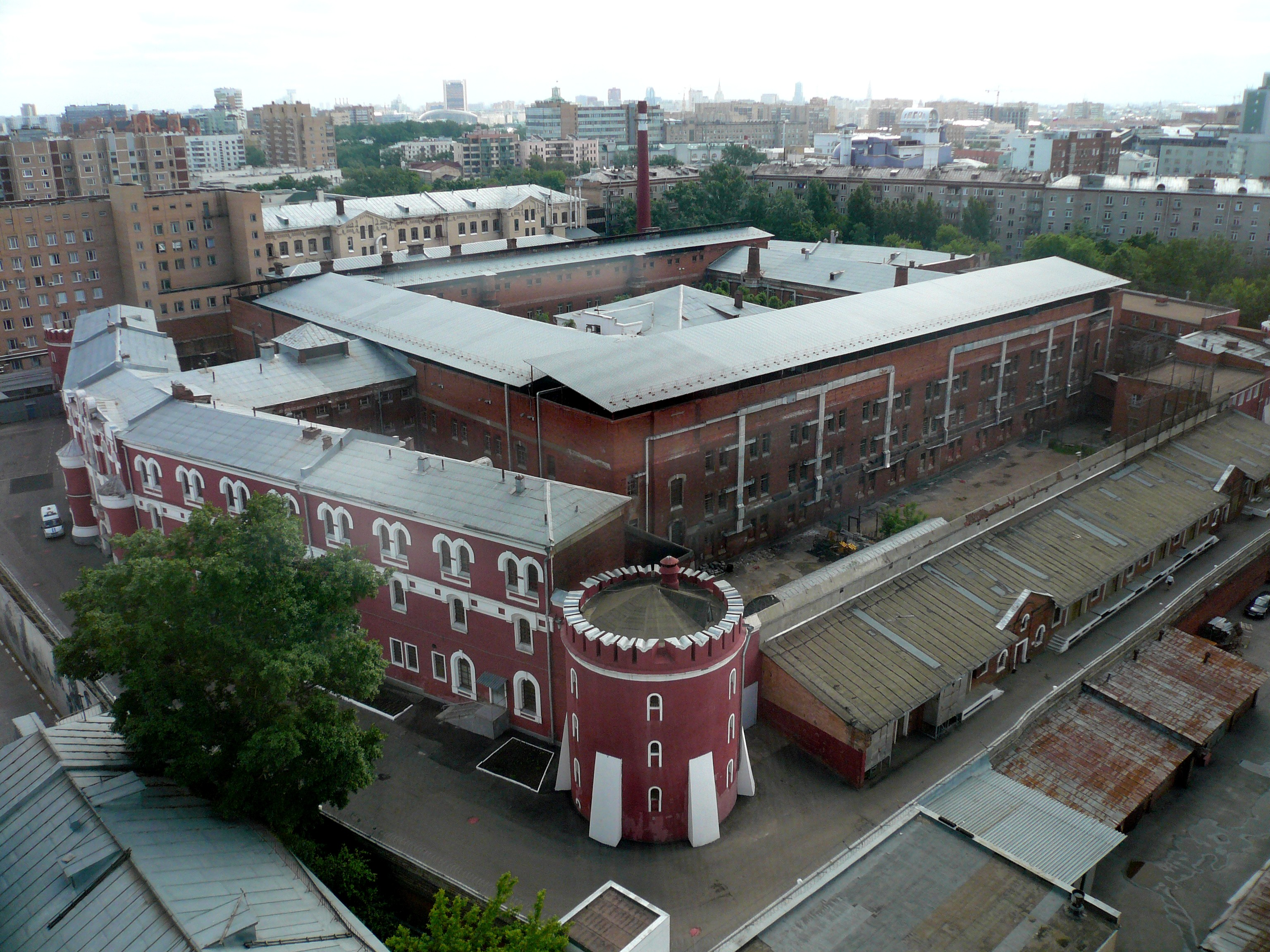
Butyrka prison, in Moscow, where Makhno was imprisoned from 1911 to 1917 (pictured in 2010)

On 26 March 1910, a Katerynoslav district court-martial sentenced Makhno to be hanged. Although he had refused to appeal, Makhno's sentence was commuted to a life sentence of hard labor, due to his young age. While in prison, Makhno contracted a near-fatal bout of typhoid fever but eventually recovered. He was moved several times: to the Luhansk prison, where family briefly visited him, to the Katerynoslav prison, and in August 1911, to Butyrka prison in Moscow, where over 3,000 political prisoners were being held. Through the other prisoners he learned Russian history and political theory, taking a particular interest in Mutual Aid: A Factor of Evolution (1902) by the Russian anarchist communist theorist Peter Kropotkin. Makhno's frequent boasting in prison earned him the nickname "Modest". He sometimes even antagonized the guards, which landed him in solitary confinement. Due to prison conditions, Makhno quickly fell sick again and was diagnosed with tuberculosis. He spent many periods in the prison hospital throughout his sentence.

In Butyrka prison, Makhno met the anarchist communist politician Peter Arshinov, who took the young anarchist on as a student. Makhno also became disillusioned with intellectualism during this time after seeing the prejudice with which guards treated prisoners of different social classes. As the years passed, Makhno began to write his own works and to distribute them among his fellow prisoners, starting off with a poem titled "Summons" that called for a libertarian communist revolution. Prison did not break his desire for revolution, as Makhno swore that he would "contribute to the free re-birth of his country". Although exposed to the ideas of Ukrainian nationalism in prison, Makhno nevertheless remained hostile to all forms of nationalism, adopting an internationalist position during World War I and even circulating an anti-war petition around the prison. When political prisoners were released during the February Revolution of 1917, Makhno's shackles were removed for the first time in eight years. He found himself physically off-balance without the chains weighing him down and in need of sunglasses after years in dark prison cells. He remained in Moscow for three weeks, briefly joining an anarchist group in Moscow's Lefortovo District until late March, when his mother and his old anarchist communist comrades convinced him to return to Huliaipole.

=== Agrarian activism ===
In March 1917, the 28-year-old Makhno returned to Huliaipole, where he was reunited with his mother and elder brothers. At the station, he was greeted by many of the town's peasants, who were curious to see the return of the famous political exile, as well as surviving members from the now-defunct Union of Poor Peasants. Clashing with many of the group's former members, who wanted to focus on propaganda, Makhno proposed that anarchists take clear leadership of the masses to ignite peasant mass action. The Huliaipole anarchists did not agree. He instead led the establishment of a local Peasants' Union on 29 March and was elected as its chairman. The union quickly came to represent the majority of Huliaipole's peasantry and even those from the surrounding region. Carpenters and metalworkers also formed their own industrial unions and elected Makhno as their chairman. By April, Huliaipole's Public Committee, the local organ of the Provisional Government, had been brought under the control of the town's peasantry and anarchist communist activists. Makhno met Nastia Vasetska, who would become his first wife, during this period but his activism left little time for his marriage.

Makhno quickly became a leading figure in Huliaipole's revolutionary movement, sidelining any political parties that sought to control the workers' organizations. He justified his leadership as only a temporary responsibility. As a union leader, Makhno led workers in strike actions against their employers, demanding doubled wages and vowing continued work stoppages if refused. This resulted in full workers' control over all Huliaipole industry. As Huliaipole's delegate to the regional peasant congress in Oleksandrivsk, he called for the expropriation of large estates from landowners and their transfer to communal ownership by the peasants that worked them. He quickly became disillusioned with the long debates and party politics that dominated the congress, considering Huliaipole to have "advanced beyond what the congresses were merely talking about, without the constant wrangling and jockeying for position." Makhno and his supporters subsequently disarmed and minimized the powers of local law enforcement, before seizing property from local landlords and equally redistributing the lands to the peasantry, in open defiance of the Russian Provisional Government and its officials in Oleksandrivsk. Local peasants compared him to the Cossack rebel leaders Stenka Razin and Yemelyan Pugachev. Huliaipole rallied around the slogan, "Land and Liberty".

Despite Makhno's success at home, the wider anarchist movement's general disorganization disappointed him. Despite its growing size, the anarchist movement found itself unable to compete with the established political parties, as it had yet to establish a coordinated organization capable of playing a leading role in the revolutionary movement. Makhno criticized the movement for largely dedicating itself to propaganda activities. Following news of General Lavr Kornilov's attempted coup against the Provisional Government, Makhno led the establishment of a "Committee for the Defense of the Revolution", which organized armed peasant detachments against the Huliaipole landlords, bourgeoisie, and kulaks. He called for disarming the local bourgeoisie, expropriating their property, and bringing all private enterprise under workers' control. Peasants withheld rent and took control of the lands they worked; large estates were collectivized and transformed into agrarian communes. Makhno personally organized communes on former Mennonite estates. He and Nastia lived together on a commune and Makhno himself worked two days per week, helping with the farming and occasionally fixing machines.

Following the 1917 October Revolution, Makhno witnessed the rising hostilities between the Ukrainian nationalists and the Bolsheviks. With the outbreak of the Soviet–Ukrainian War, Makhno advised anarchists to take up arms alongside the Red Guards against the forces of the Ukrainian nationalists and the White movement. Makhno dispatched his brother Savelii to Oleksandrivsk at the head of an armed anarchist detachment to assist the Bolsheviks in retaking the city from the Nationalists. The city was taken and Makhno was chosen as the anarchists' representative to the Oleksandrivsk Revolutionary Committee. He was also elected chairman of a commission, which reviewed the cases of accused counter-revolutionary military prisoners, and oversaw the release of still imprisoned workers and peasants. During this period Makhno participated in Oleksandrivsk's successful defence against an assault by Don and Kuban Cossacks. Makhno thereafter returned to Huliaipole, where he organized the town bank's expropriation to fund the local anarchist movement's revolutionary activities.

=== Journey to Moscow ===
Map of Makhno's journey to and from Moscow in 1918

In February 1918, representatives from the Ukrainian People's Republic (UPR) signed a peace treaty with the Central Powers, inviting the forces of the German Empire and Austria-Hungary to invade and occupy Ukraine. In response, Makhno formed a volunteer detachment to resist the occupation. They joined the Bolshevik Red Guards in Oleksandrivsk. Makhno was personally summoned to the train of Bolshevik Commander Alexander Yegorov but failed to link up with Yegorov who was in fast retreat. In Makhno's absence, Ukrainian nationalists seized control of Huliaipole and invited Austro-Hungarian Army forces to occupy the town in April 1918. Unable to return home, Makhno retreated to Taganrog, where he held a conference of Huliaipole's exiled anarchists. Makhno left to rally Russian support for the Ukrainian anarchist cause with plans to retake Huliaipole in July 1918. In early May, Makhno visited Rostov-on-Don, Tikhoretsk, and Tsaritsyn, where he was briefly reunited with Nastia and some of his Huliaipole comrades.

On his travels, Makhno witnessed the newly established Bolshevik secret police – the Cheka – confront, disarm, and kill revolutionary partisans who disobeyed their decrees, causing Makhno to question whether "institutional revolutionaries" would extinguish the revolution. In Astrakhan, Makhno found himself working for the local soviet's propaganda department and giving speeches to Red soldiers bound for the front. While traveling by rail to Moscow near the end of May, Makhno used the armored train's artillery to impede the Don Cossacks in pursuit of Makhno and the Red Guards in his company.

After passing through the Volga region, Makhno finally arrived in Moscow. He pejoratively dubbed the city "the capital of the paper revolution" after its local anarchist intellectuals, whom Makhno considered more inclined to slogans and manifestos than action. Here he reunited with Peter Arshinov and others in the Muscovite anarchist movement, many of whom were under surveillance by the Bolshevik authorities. He also met the Left Socialist-Revolutionaries, who at this time were beginning to turn against the Bolsheviks. Makhno discussed the situation in Ukraine with Peter Kropotkin.

Satisfied with his time in Moscow, Makhno applied to the Kremlin for forged identity papers so that he could cross the Ukrainian border. Yakov Sverdlov immediately arranged for Makhno to meet Vladimir Lenin, who believed that anarchism had "contaminated" the peasantry and questioned Makhno extensively. Makhno staunchly defended the Ukrainian anarchist movement from charges of "counter-revolution", criticizing the Red Guards for sticking to the railways while peasant partisans fought on the front lines. Lenin expressed his admiration for Makhno and admitted he had made mistakes in his analysis of the revolutionary conditions in Ukraine, where anarchists had already become the predominant revolutionary force. Lenin passed Makhno to Volodymyr Zatonsky, who fulfilled his request for a false passport. Makhno finally departed for the border in late June 1918, content that he had taken "the temperature of the revolution".

== Leader of the Makhnovist movement ==
Major Makhnovist movement events, as shown with modern-day Ukraine borders

=== Return to Ukraine ===
In late April 1918, during Makhno's absence from Ukraine, the Austrian and German occupation forces orchestrated a coup against their former allies within the Ukrainian People's Republic, removing the UPR's Central Council and installing Pavlo Skoropadskyi as Hetman of a new conservative client state.

Carrying a fake passport and disguised as a Ukrainian officer, Makhno crossed the Ukrainian border in July 1918. He learned that the forces occupying Huliaipole had shot, tortured, and arrested many of the town's revolutionaries. His brother Savelii had been arrested, and his brother Omelian, a disabled war veteran, executed. Their mother's house was also destroyed by the occupation forces. Makhno himself was forced to take precautions to evade capture. To avoid recognition while aboard the crowded train carriages, he changed at Kharkiv and Synelnykove, and ultimately decided to walk the final 27 kilometers to Rozhdestvenka after his train was searched by police. Through correspondence, Makhno's comrades in Huliaipole discouraged him from returning, fearing he would be caught by the authorities.

After weeks in hiding, Makhno clandestinely returned to Huliaipole. In secret meetings, he began to lay plans for an insurrection and started to organize peasant partisans. He advocated coordinated attacks on the estates of large landowners, advised against individual acts of terrorism, and forbade anti-semitic pogroms. From the outset, Makhno emphasized tactical and theoretical unity, patiently awaiting favorable conditions for a general insurrection.

The authorities discovered Makhno's presence and placed a bounty on his head, forcing him to retreat from Huliaipole. In Ternivka, Makhno revealed himself to the local population and established a peasant detachment to lead attacks against the occupation and Hetmanate government. In coordination with partisans in Rozhdestvenka, Makhno resolved to reoccupy and establish Huliaipole as the insurgency's permanent headquarters. He raided Austrian positions, seizing weapons and money, which led to the insurrection's intensification in the region. While disguised as a woman, Makhno even briefly returned to Huliaipole, where he planned to blow up the local command center of the occupation forces. According to Makhno's account, he called off the attack to avoid civilian casualties.

=== Insurgent actions ===
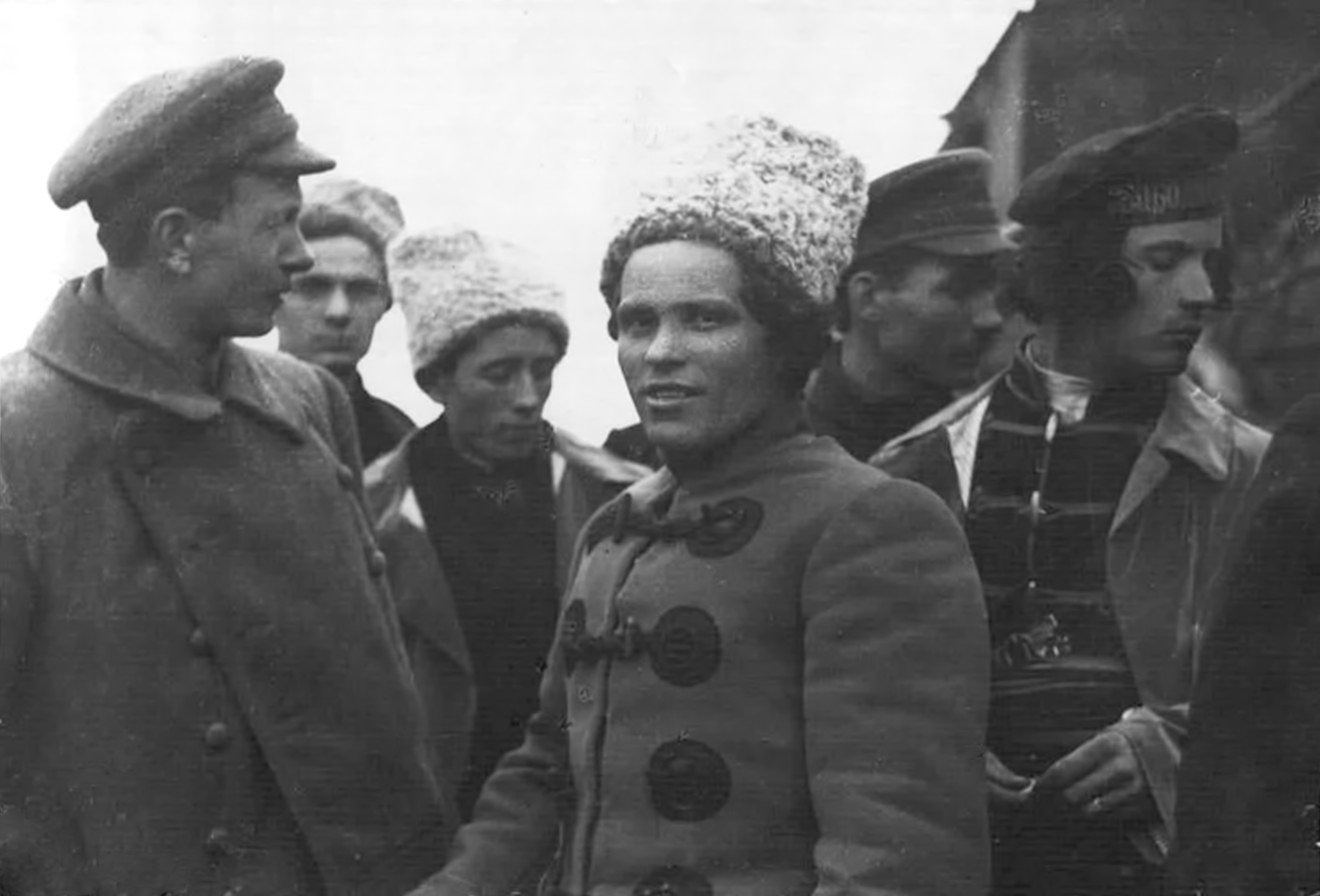
Makhno (centre) and Fedir Shchus (right), together with other Insurgent command staff in Huliaipole (1919)

In September 1918, Makhno briefly reoccupied Huliaipole. The German occupation forces had spread misinformation about him there, claiming he had robbed the local peasantry and ran away with the money to buy a dacha in Moscow. After defeating Austrian units in the nearby village of Marfopil, Makhno produced a letter that was translated into the German language, encouraging the conscripted occupation troops to mutiny, return home and launch revolutions of their own. While his comrades scattered themselves throughout the region to rouse the peasants to revolt, Makhno prepared proclamations to announce the region was under insurgent control. When the occupation forces counterattacked, Makhno was forced to evacuate Huliaipole.

Makhno's detachment withdrew north, where it sought refuge in the Dibrivka forest, neighboring the village of Velykomykhailivka. There they joined forces with another small insurgent detachment led by Fedir Shchus. When Austrian units surrounded the insurgents in their forest encampment, to break the encirclement, Makhno launched a surprise counterattack against the troops in the village. Led by Makhno and Shchus, the insurgents' gamble succeeded in forcing the Austrians into retreat. For his role in their victory, the insurgents bestowed Makhno with the title Bat'ko (English: Father), which remained his moniker throughout the war.

Makhno's victory in the battle of Dibrivka provoked a retaliation from the occupation forces. Austrian troops attacked Velykomykhailovka, reinforced by National Guard and German colonist units. The village was set on fire, killing many inhabitants and destroying some 600 houses. Makhno, in turn, led a campaign of retributive attacks against the occupation forces and their collaborators, including much of the region's Mennonite population. Makhno also focused much of his energies on agitating among the peasantry, gathering much support in the region through impassioned impromptu village speeches against his enemies.

By November 1918, the insurgents definitively recaptured Huliaipole. At a regional insurgent conference, Makhno proposed that they open up a war on four simultaneous fronts against the Hetmanate, Central Powers, Don Cossacks, and nascent White movement. He argued that to prosecute such a conflict, it would be necessary to organize a Revolutionary Insurgent Army of Ukraine according to a federal model, directly answerable to him as commander-in-chief.

=== Integration into the Red Army ===
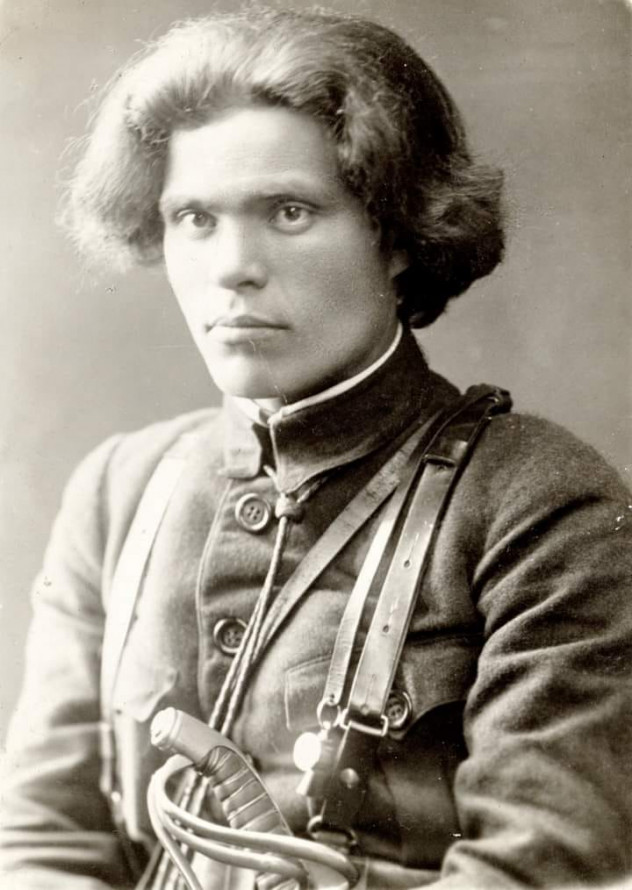
Makhno wearing his Red Army uniform (1919)

The Central Powers' defeat in World War I saw their withdrawal from Ukraine, resulting in the overthrow of the Hetmanate government by the Directorate, which established a new nationalist government in Kyiv under the leadership of Symon Petliura. At the same time, the Bolsheviks invaded Ukraine from the north, while the Makhnovshchina faced pressure from a growing White Army in the south. Caught between these forces, Makhno proposed an alliance with the Red Army.

During a joint Insurgent-Bolshevik attack against the nationalist-held city of Katerynoslav, Makhno was appointed as commander-in-chief of the combined Soviet forces in the province. After capturing the city, Makhno oversaw the establishment of a revolutionary committee equally representing Bolsheviks, Socialist Revolutionaries (SRs), and anarchists. When a nationalist counteroffensive forced Makhno to retreat to Huliaipole, he undertook a complete reorganization of insurgent forces on every front, culminating in the January 1919 integration of Makhnovist units into the Ukrainian Soviet Army. In this 3rd Trans-Dnieper Brigade, Makhno was subordinate to Pavel Dybenko's command. The next month, Makhno extricated himself from the front to attend the movement's second regional congress in Huliaipole. He was elected honorary chairman, but rejected official chairmanship as the front required his attention. At the congress, he declared his support for "non-party soviets" in open defiance of his Bolshevik commanders.

Makhno justified the integration of the insurgent forces into the Red Army as a matter of placing the "revolution's interests above ideological differences". He was, nevertheless, open about his contempt for the new order of political commissars. Bolshevik interference in front-line operations even led to Makhno arresting a Cheka detachment, which had directly obstructed his command. Despite his hostility towards the Bolsheviks, Makhno authorized Bolshevik newspapers to be distributed in Huliaipole, Berdiansk, and Mariupol, even as their pages denounced the Makhnovists.

By April 1919, the newspaper Pravda was publishing glowing reports of Makhno's activities, praising his opposition to Ukrainian nationalism, his successful assault against Katerynoslav, and his continued successes against the White movement. These reports also detailed Makhno's widespread support among the Ukrainian peasantry. This did not stop Dybenko from declaring the insurgents' subsequent regional congresses to be "counter-revolutionary", outlawing their participants, and ordering Makhno to prevent future congresses. The Makhnovist Military Revolutionary Council issued an excoriating reply to Dybenko rejecting his demands.

To resolve the dispute, Makhno invited Ukrainian Soviet Army Commander-in-Chief Vladimir Antonov-Ovseenko to visit Huliaipole, which impressed him and allayed his doubts about Makhno's command. Upon his return, Antonov-Ovseenko openly praised Makhno and the insurgents, criticizing the Bolshevik press for publishing misinformation about Makhno and requesting the Makhnovists be supplied with the necessary equipment. His reports quickly attracted Politburo member Lev Kamenev to himself visit Huliaipole the very next week. Kamenev too was greeted by Makhno and his new wife Halyna Kuzmenko, who gave the Bolshevik functionary a tour of the town, making sure to show off a tree where Makhno had personally lynched a White army officer. Despite disagreements between the two over the autonomy of the insurgent movement, Kamenev bade farewell to Makhno with an embrace and warm words. Kamenev immediately published an open letter to Makhno, praising him as an "honest and courageous fighter" in the war against the White movement.

=== Dealings with Hryhoriv ===
In May 1919, the powerful otaman Nykyfor Hryhoriv led an uprising against the Bolsheviks, seizing part of Kherson province. Kamenev of the Politburo telegrammed Makhno to condemn Hryhoriv or else face a declaration of war. (Hryhoriv had previously attempted to ally with Makhno against the Bolsheviks, unsuccessfully.) In reply to Kamenev, Makhno reaffirmed his commitment to fight the White movement, worried that open conflict with Hryhoriv would endanger that commitment, declared his loyalty to the revolution, but also stated that he would continue to oppose the Cheka and any other "organs of oppression and violence". In an insurgent military congress in May, Makhno expanded on this anti-authoritarian position with a denunciation of the Bolsheviks, their implementation of bureaucratic collectivism, and their political repression, which he compared to the Tsarist autocracy. After Makhnovist emissaries uncovered evidence of Hryhoriv's participation in pogroms, Makhno openly denounced him for his displays of antisemitism and Ukrainian nationalism, going on to blame the Bolsheviks for the rise of Hryhoriv, claiming it was their political repression that had caused the uprising.

As the Donbas front collapsed, the Red Army high command began to blame Makhno for their defeat and attempted to rein in his influence over his detachment. Makhno's Red Army superior Commander Anatoly Skachko even declared that "he is to be liquidated". By the end of May 1919, the Bolshevik Revolutionary Military Council pronounced Makhno to be an outlaw, issuing a warrant for his arrest and for him to be tried before a revolutionary tribunal. On 2 June, Leon Trotsky published a diatribe attacking Makhno for his anarchist ideology and labeling him a kulak.

A few days later, while preoccupied at the front, Makhno learned that the Kuban Cossacks had captured Huliaipole. This forced him to retreat from his positions. In an attempt to appease Trotsky, Makhno resigned his command of the insurgent army so that the insurgents would not be caught in a pincer between the Red and White armies. Despite a rebuff from Trotsky, he again attempted to offer the Bolsheviks his resignation on 9 June, reaffirming his commitment to the Revolution and his belief in the "inalienable right of workers and peasants". Makhno relinquished command of the 7th Ukrainian Soviet Division and declared his intention to wage a guerrilla war against the Whites from the rear. Trotsky then ordered Kliment Voroshilov to arrest Makhno, but sympathetic officers reported the order to him, preventing his capture by the Cheka. Despite having broken with the Red Army, Makhno still considered the White movement to be the Makhnovists' "main enemy" and insisted that they could settle their scores with Bolsheviks after the Whites were defeated.

Makhno's small sotnia then linked up with other insurgent detachments that had mutinied against the Red Army. In early July 1919, Makhno fell back into Kherson province, where he met with Hryhoriv's green army. Initially Makhno sought to form a strategic alliance with the latter due to Hryhoriv's popularity among the local peasantry but revelations of Hryhoriv's antisemitism, extensive pogroms, and connections with the White movement led the Makhnovists to openly denounce the otaman at a public meeting. When Hryhoriv reached for his revolver, he was shot dead by Oleksiy Chubenko.

In the assassination's aftermath, Makhno quickly rebuilt his army. A portion of Hryhoriv's army was integrated into the Makhnovist forces, which numbered as high as 20,000 insurgents at this time. By August, Makhno was also attracting many Red Army deserters who joined him as the Bolsheviks once again retreated from Ukrainian territory in the face of Anton Denikin's White Army. Red Army mutinies became so bad that the Ukrainian Bolshevik leader Nikolai Golubenko even telephoned Makhno, begging him to subordinate himself again to Bolshevik command, which Makhno refused.

=== Against the White Army ===
By September 1919, the Bolsheviks had largely retreated from Ukraine, leaving the Makhnovists to face the White Army alone. Reports by the White commander Yakov Slashchov depicted Makhno as a formidable adversary with tactical ability and disciplinary command over his troops. The insurgents launched several effective attacks behind White lines, Makhno himself commanding a cavalry assault against Mykolaivka that resulted in the capture of sorely needed munitions. His brother Hryhorii died during one of these attacks.

The White offensive eventually pushed the insurgents back as far as Uman, the last stronghold of the Ukrainian People's Republic. There Makhno negotiated a temporary truce with Petliura, the commander-in-chief of the Ukrainian People's Army (UPA), to allow wounded insurgents to recuperate on neutral ground before launching a counteroffensive. During the Battle of Perehonivka, the tide of the battle turned in the insurgents' favor when Makhno led his sotnia in a flank against the White positions, charging the much larger enemy force and engaging in close-quarters combat that forced the Whites to retreat. Makhno led the pursuit of the retreating Whites, decisively routing the enemy forces.

The territory of the Makhnovshchina at its greatest extent (light red), following the battle of Perehonivka, with the core of Makhnovist territory in Katerynoslav province (dark red)

The Makhnovists split up to capitalize on their victory and capture as much territory as possible. Makhno himself led his sotnia in the capture of Katerynoslav from the Whites on 20 October. With southern Ukraine brought almost entirely under insurgent control, the White supply lines were broken and the advance on Moscow was halted. The insurgent advance also attacked the region's Mennonites, including the Eichenfeld massacre. Mennonite historiography has held Makhno himself directly responsible for the massacres, as commander-in-chief of the perpetrating forces, and Makhnovist historiography has attributed the violence to class conflict, the result of deep-seated resentments between the native Ukrainians and Mennonite colonists.

Bolsheviks in Katerynoslav attempted to establish a revolutionary committee to control the city, proposing to Makhno that he confine himself exclusively to military activity but Makhno no longer held any sympathy for the Bolsheviks, who he described as "parasites upon the workers' lives". He quickly ordered the revolutionary committee be shut down and forbade their activities under penalty of death, telling the Bolshevik officials to "take up a more honest trade". At a regional congress in Oleksandrivsk, Makhno presented the Draft Declaration of the Revolutionary Insurgent Army of Ukraine, which called for the establishment of "free soviets" outside of political party control. Mensheviks and Socialist Revolutionary Party delegates objected, believing instead in the legitimacy of the dissolved Constituent Assembly. Makhno denounced them as "counter-revolutionaries", causing them to walk out in protest.

When he returned to Katerynoslav in November 1919, the local railway workers looked to Makhno to pay their wages, which they had gone without for two months. He responded by proposing the workers self-manage the railways and levy payment for their services directly from the customers. By December, Makhnovist control of Katerynoslav began to slip under increasing attacks from the White Cossacks. On 5 December, Makhno survived an assassination attempt by the Bolsheviks, who had planned to poison him and seize control of the city. After the plot was uncovered, the conspirators were shot.

=== Alliance with the Bolsheviks ===
Renewed White attacks forced the Makhnovists to abandon Katerynoslav and retreat towards Oleksandrivsk and Nikopol. During this period, many of the insurgents were beset by epidemic typhus. Makhno himself contracted the disease. In January 1920, the Red Army returned to Ukraine, filling a power vacuum that had been left in the wake of the White retreat. Makhnovist and Red forces greeted each other in Oleksandrivsk, but negotiations between the two sides collapsed when the Red command ordered Makhno to the Polish front. Makhno refused and the All-Ukrainian Central Executive Committee declared him to be an outlaw.

In response, the Makhnovists fled to Huliaipole, initiating a nine-month period of hostilities with the Bolsheviks. At this time, Makhno's typhus worsened, and he slipped into prolonged coma, during which local peasants provided him refuge and hid him from the Cheka. Once Makhno recovered, he immediately began to lead a campaign of guerrilla warfare against the Cheka and requisitioning units. Makhno also implemented a discriminatory policy for dealing with captured Red Army units: commanding officers and political commissars would be immediately shot, and the rank-and-file soldiers would be given the choice to either join the insurgent army or be stripped of their uniforms and sent home. With increased Makhnovist attacks on Bolshevik positions as well as Red Army defections to the insurgents, the two factions considered alliance proposals.

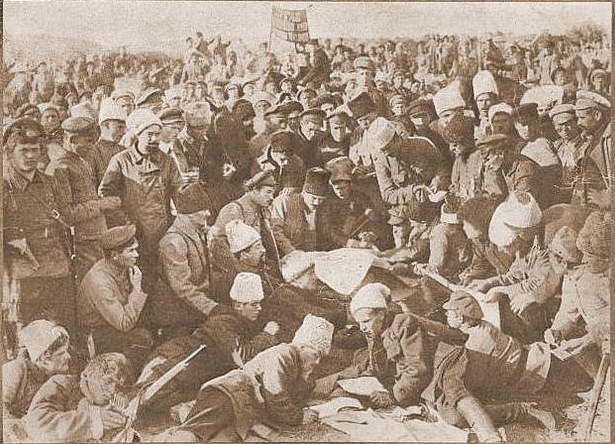
Insurgent army troops reading the terms of the Starobilsk agreement

Though initially sceptical of a proposed Bolshevik alliance in June, Makhno grew amenable and left the decision to his army, which narrowly voted in favor in August. Their Starobilsk agreement extended freedoms to Ukrainian anarchists while again integrating the insurgents into the Red Army command structure. Despite these outcomes, Makhno reaffirmed his distrust for his "irreconcilable enemies" in the Bolshevik Party, stating that the necessity of a military alliance with them should not be confused with a recognition of their political authority. Makhno still hoped that victory over the Whites would oblige the Bolsheviks to honor his desire for soviet democracy and civil liberties in Ukraine. He would later consider this to be a "grave error" on his part.

Under the terms of the pact, Makhno was able to seek treatment from the medical corps of the Red Army, physicians and surgeons seeing to a wound in his ankle, where he had been hit by an expanding bullet. He was also visited by the Hungarian communist leader Béla Kun, who gave him gifts, including over 100 photographs and postcards depicting the Executive Committee of the Communist International. In October, the insurgents successfully reoccupied Huliaipole, driving the Whites out of the city for the last time.

Back in his hometown, Makhno's request for three days of rest and recuperation was rejected by the Bolshevik command, which ordered the insurgents to continue their offensive, under penalty of nullifying their alliance. The still-wounded Makhno stayed behind in Huliaipole anyway, along with his black guard, while dispatching Semen Karetnyk to lead the Makhnovist offensive against the Army of Wrangel. Makhno once again turned his attention towards reconstructing his vision of anarchist communism, overseeing the reestablishment of the local soviet and other anarchist projects.

=== Anti-Bolshevik rebellion ===
After the combined Bolshevik-Makhnovist forces defeated Pyotr Wrangel in Crimea and ended the Russian Civil War's Southern Front, the Bolsheviks once again turned on their anarchist allies. In late November 1920, the Red Army launched a surprise attack against the insurgent forces, putting the Makhnovist capital of Huliaipole under siege. Caught unprepared, Makhno rallied together 150 Black Guards to defend the town. After spotting a gap in the Red lines, he escaped with his detachment and led a counterattack that pushed the Red forces back to Novouspenivka. His own forces regrouped and gained some defecting Red soldiers before recapturing Huliaipole a week later. The Red Army command justified the attacks against the Makhnovists on grounds that Makhno had refused orders and intended to betray them, though the Red Army had planned to break the alliance with the Makhnovists even before the beginning of the offensive against Wrangel's White Army.

The following week in Kermenchyk, Makhno was finally reunited with Karetnyk's detachment, which had been reduced to a fifth of its original size after its commander was assassinated by the Bolsheviks in Crimea. Lenin gave direct orders for the Red Army to "liquidate Makhno", the insurgents leading a guerrilla campaign in the face of their encirclement. On 3 December, Makhno led a detachment of 4,000 insurgents in an assault routing a Red Kirghiz brigade at Komar. In the following weeks, he recaptured Berdiansk and Andriivka from the Bolsheviks, defeating several Red divisions before a stalemate with the remaining divisions at Fedorivka.

Makhno had hoped that simply defeating a few Red divisions would halt the offensive but found himself having to change tactics in the face of his encirclement by overwhelming numbers. He consequently split up his contingent into smaller detachments and sent them in different directions, to carry out their guerrilla sabotage efforts more effectively. Taking his own 2,000-strong detachment north on horseback at a pace of 80 kilometers each day, he derailed a Bolshevik armored train at Oleksandrivsk, before pushing deep into the provinces of Kherson and Kyiv, all the while pursued by Red divisions.

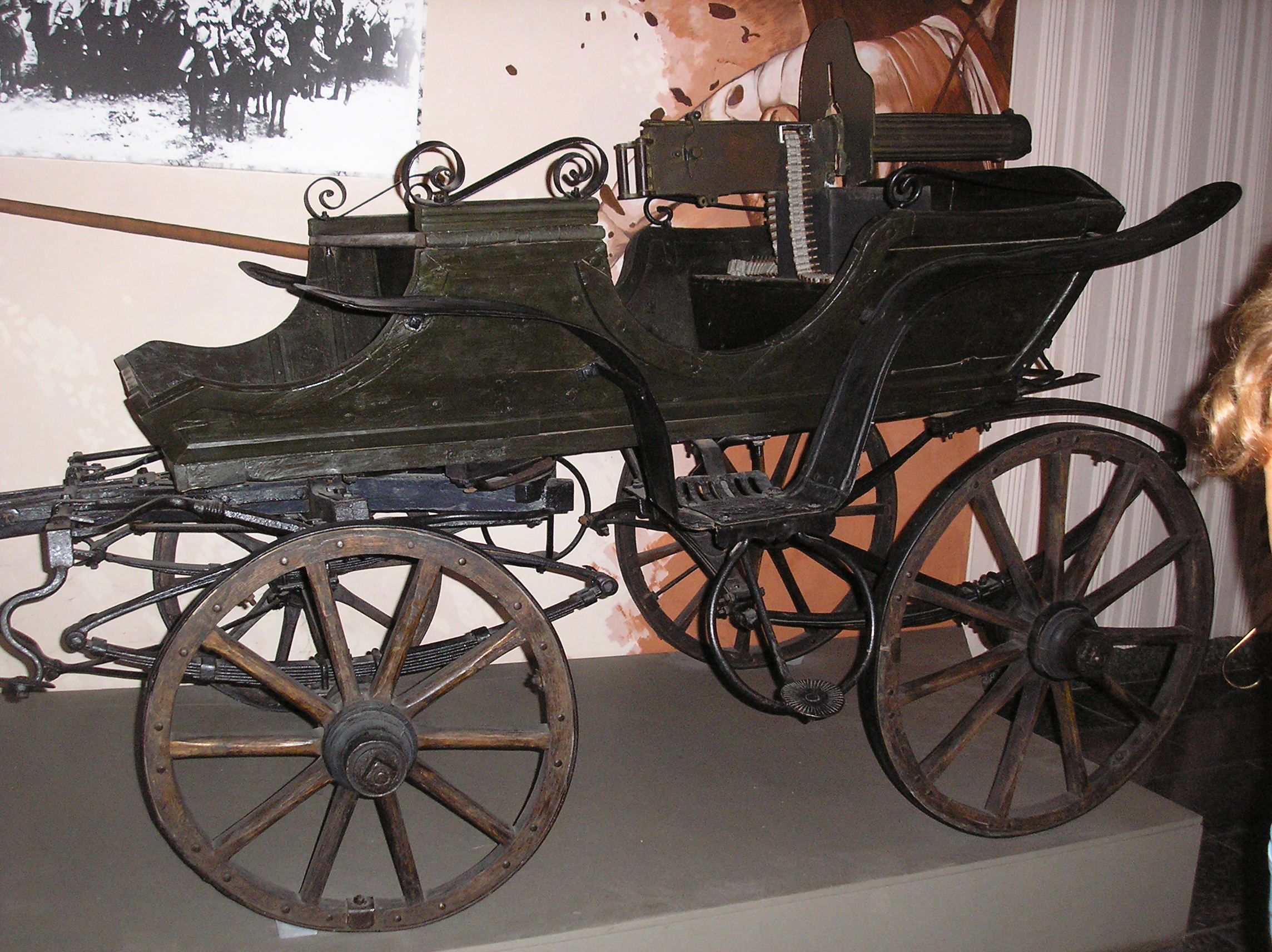
The tachanka, a horse-drawn cart with a mounted machine gun, was widely used by the Revolutionary Insurgent Army of Ukraine.

Surrounded and under constant pursuit by the Red Cossacks, Makhno's detachment could only advance slowly under heavy machine gun fire and artillery bombardment. Makhno led his detachment to the Galician border before suddenly swinging around and heading back across the Dnieper. Heading north from Poltava to Belgorod, they finally managed to shake off the pursuing Cossacks at the end of January 1921. By this point he had travelled more than 1,500 kilometers, lost most of his equipment and half of his detachment, but he also found himself in a position to once again lead an offensive against the Red Army. Following the outbreak of the Kronstadt rebellion, Makhno dispatched detachments to various regions of Southern and Central Russia to foment insurrection, while he himself stuck to the banks of the Dnieper River. At this time, Makhno was wounded in the foot and had to be carried by a tachanka, but still managed to personally lead the detachment from the front. After crossing back over to left-bank Ukraine, he split his detachment again, sending one to stir up revolt against the Cheka near the Sea of Azov while Makhno's own contingent of 1,500 cavalry and two infantry regiments continued along its path, seizing the equipment of the Red units it routed. During one engagement, Makhno was wounded in the stomach and fell unconscious, having to be evacuated on a tachanka. Upon his resuscitation, he again divided his forces and sent them out in all directions, leaving himself behind with only his black sotnia remaining.

Makhno was unable to withdraw from the front and tend to his injuries, as his sotnia repeatedly came under attack by the Red Army. During one engagement, several Makhnovists sacrificed themselves to ensure Makhno's escape. Towards the end of May 1921, Makhno attempted to organize a large-scale offensive to take the Ukrainian Bolshevik capital of Kharkiv, pulling together thousands of partisans before he was forced to call it off due to substantial Red defenses. The Red Army command resolved to focus its efforts on Makhno's small 200-strong sotnia, deploying a motorized detachment to pursue them. Upon its arrival, Makhno led the ambush of one armored car, taking it for himself and driving it until it ran out of fuel. The subsequent pursuit of Makhno lasted five days and covered 520 kilometers, causing his sotnia heavy losses and almost running them out of ammunition, before they were finally able to shake the armored detachment off their trail.

== Exile ==
=== Eastern Europe ===
Red Army commander Mikhail Frunze demanded the "definitive liquidation" of the Makhnovist movement in July 1921. Makhno continued to execute raids in the Don river basin despite having suffered several wounds. By August, the severity of his wounds convinced him to seek treatment abroad. Leaving Viktor Bilash in command of the Insurgent Army, Makhno, his wife Halyna, and around 100 loyalists set out for the Polish border. The Red Army followed them with sustained attacks; Makhno took a bullet in the neck and several of his old friends died in battle in late August. When a scout was captured by the Reds, Makhno diverted his forces south towards Romania. After crossing the Dniester, Romanian border guards disarmed and interned Makhno's group. Makhno and his wife were eventually released from the Brașov internment camp and granted permission to stay in Bucharest under police surveillance while Makhno recovered from his wounds.

Bolshevik politicians Georgy Chicherin and Christian Rakovsky demanded Makhno's extradition, which the Romanian government of Take Ionescu refused. The two states had no extradition treaty and Romania had abolished capital punishment, so the Romanian government requested a formal assurance that the Ukrainian Soviet government would not sentence Makhno to death. Makhno came into contact with the exiled Ukrainian nationalists associated with Petliura, themselves allies of both Romania and Poland. Makhno's calls for an alliance between the Makhnovists and the Petliurists to reignite an insurgency in Ukraine were unsuccessful.

With Romania still caught up in the extradition demands, Makhno fled to Poland. He was caught at the border and sent to the Polish Strzałkowo internment camp in April 1922. The Polish government refused Makhno's requests to move to Czechoslovakia or Germany. The Russian Bolshevik government sent an agent provocateur to entrap Makhno and force his extradition by embroiling him in a plan to launch an insurgency in Galicia. Makhno and his wife were formally charged by the Polish authorities and for over a year held in pre-trial detention, where Halyna gave birth to their daughter in October. In prison, Makhno drafted his first memoir, which Peter Arshinov published in 1923 in his Berlin-based newspaper Anarkhicheskii vestnik (Russian: Анархический вестник; English: Anarchist Messenger). Makhno also sent open letters to exiled Don Cossacks and the Ukrainian Communist Party, and began to learn German and Esperanto. His tuberculosis relapsed under the prison's conditions.

Makhno received support from the European anarchist movement. Polish and Bulgarian anarchists even threatened violence in the event of Makhno's extradition. At their five-day trial in November 1923, Makhno and Halyna were acquitted on all charges and given residence permits for Poznań. The following month he and his family moved to Toruń, where he was under close police surveillance. He was also arrested and interrogated several times in the wake of Lenin's death. Unable to secure a visa to travel to Germany and facing a severe strain on his marriage with Halyna, Makhno attempted suicide in April 1924 and was hospitalized by his injuries.

In July 1924, Polish authorities let Makhno and his family move to the Free City of Danzig. Here, Makhno was swiftly arrested by the Danzig authorities for visa violations. While interned he was struck again by tuberculosis and transferred to a prison hospital. Makhno's anarchist allies helped him escape the hospital and, after a time in hiding, leave for Berlin. With Russian anarchist Volin acting as his interpreter, Makhno met with prominent anarchists that were also living in the city such as Rudolf Rocker and Ugo Fedeli. He finally moved to Paris in April 1925.

=== Paris ===
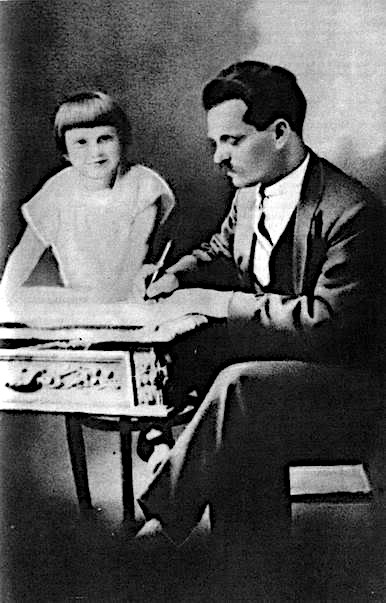
Makhno and his daughter Elena in Paris

Upon his arrival in Paris in April 1925, Makhno wrote that he had found himself "amongst a foreign people and political enemies whom I have so often declaimed against". He was reunited with his wife and daughter in the city, where French anarchists like May Picqueray provided the family with lodging and healthcare. Makhno found work at a local foundry and a Renault factory but was forced to leave both jobs due to his health problems. His right foot was considered for amputation because of an old bullet wound in his ankle. His health care was overseen by the libertarian feminist Lucile Pelletier, who described his body as being "literally encased in scar tissue". She advised his family to move out to prevent them from contracting tuberculosis. Between his debilitating illness, homesickness and a strong language barrier, Makhno fell into a deep depression. According to Alexander Berkman, Makhno particularly despised living in a big city and dreamed of returning to the Ukrainian countryside, where he could "tak[e] up again the struggle for liberty and social justice".

Makhno undertook to write his Memoirs, which sold poorly. He also collaborated with exiled Russian anarchists to establish the bimonthly libertarian communist journal Delo truda (Russian: Дело труда, English: The Cause of Labor), in which Makhno published an article in each issue over three years. Arshinov, the journal's editor, criticized Makhno's articles as poorly written, which upset Makhno greatly and exacerbated his resentment of those anarchists whom he considered to be "armchair theoreticians". The theoretical developments of the journal eventually culminated in the publication of the Organizational Platform of the General Union of Anarchists, which called for the reorganization of the anarchist movement into a more cohesive structure, based on the experiences of revolutionary Ukraine and their defeat by the Bolsheviks. The Platform attracted criticism from the synthesists, such as Volin, who regarded it as a Bolshevization of anarchism. A March 1927 meeting to discuss the Platform in L'Haÿ-les-Roses attracted anarchists from Russia, Poland, Bulgaria, Italy, and China. When the meeting was raided by police, Makhno was arrested and threatened with deportation, but he was defended by Louis Lecoin and Henri Sellier, who secured his continued stay in France.

French police file on Makhno, Kuzmenko and their daughter

During this period, Makhno often met with anarchist friends in cafes and restaurants, reminiscing over a bottle of wine about their time in Ukraine. In June 1926, during a meal with May Picqueray and the exiled Russian-American Jewish anarchist Alexander Berkman in a Russian restaurant, Makhno met with the Ukrainian Jewish anarchist Sholem Schwarzbard, who went pale upon seeing the Ukrainian nationalist leader Symon Petliura walk into the room. Schwarzbard immediately informed Makhno of his intention to assassinate Petliura in revenge for the anti-Jewish pogroms carried out in the Ukrainian People's Republic, during which some 15 of his family members had been killed. Makhno attempted to dissuade him but the deed was carried out anyway. Schwarzbard's subsequent trial revealed a trove of documentary evidence regarding the pogroms in Ukraine, which helped exonerate the assassin.

Around this time, rumors began to circulate about Makhno's own relationship to antisemitism, resulting in public debates on the matter. Citing stories of Makhno told by White émigrés, Joseph Kessel published a novel that portrayed a fictionalized version of Makhno as an Orthodox Christian and antisemite, an accusation which Makhno categorically denied. Makhno defended himself by speaking up about the pogroms in Ukraine: in To the Jews of all Countries, published in Delo truda, he asked for evidence of antisemitism in the Makhnovist ranks; at an open debate in June 1927, Makhno claimed that he had defended Ukrainian Jews from persecution, an assertion that was backed up by Russian and Ukrainian Jews in attendance.

During his time in Ukraine, Makhno had condemned and severely punished cases of antisemitism within the Makhnovist ranks, even having ordered the execution of Makhnovists that had participated in a pogrom against the Jewish settlement at Gorkaya and redistributed weapons to the Jewish community for their own protection. According to Volin, investigations by the Jewish historian Elias Tcherikower had found no evidence of Makhno himself having perpetrated antisemitic violence. Allegations of antisemitism were later also disputed by historians and some of Makhno's biographers, including Paul Avrich, Peter Kenez, Michael Malet and Alexandre Skirda.

=== Failing health and death ===
By the late 1920s, Makhno was succumbing to physical and mental illness. His relationships with fellow Ukrainian exiles deteriorated. His wife grew to resent him, causing the couple to separate several times; Halyna unsuccessfully applied for permission to return to Soviet Ukraine. Over the editing of his memoirs, Makhno quarreled with Ida Mett, who quit out of frustration with Makhno's "indecipherable and meandering manuscripts". He also came into a serious personal and political conflict with Volin, which would last until their deaths, resulting in the later volumes of Makhno's memoirs only being published posthumously. As gossip spread about Makhno, he became increasingly defensive against any criticisms of himself, no matter how minor. In the pages of Delo truda, he published categorical denials of anything from allegations of antisemitism to whether the Makhnovists had used a flag that carried a skull and crossbones.

Due to the threats of deportation, he mostly kept to his writing, as he was no longer able to attend meetings or engage in active organizing. In great pain, increasingly isolated and financially precarious, Makhno got odd jobs as an interior decorator and shoemaker. He was also supported by the income of his wife, who worked as a cleaner. In April 1929, May Picqueray and other French anarchists established a "Makhno Solidarity Committee" to raise funds. Much of the money was contributed by the Spanish anarchists of the Confederación Nacional del Trabajo (CNT), who greatly admired Makhno; the fundraiser in Le Libertaire eventually secured Makhno's family a weekly allowance of 250 francs, barely one-third of the living wage. Makhno spent most of this money on his daughter, neglecting his own self-care, which contributed further to his declining health. His ideological conflict with the synthesists escalated and, in July 1930, Le Libertaire suspended his allowance. Individual fundraising attempts were unsuccessful.

Alienated from many of the Russian and French anarchists in Paris, Makhno turned his attention towards Spain. Following the release of Spanish anarchists from prison, Makhno met with Francisco Ascaso and Buenaventura Durruti. The Spaniards expressed their admiration for Makhno, who himself displayed a sense of optimism about the Spanish anarchist movement and foretold of a coming anarchist revolution in Spain. Makhno was particularly impressed by the revolutionary traditions of the Spanish working classes and the tight organization of the Spanish anarchists, declaring that if a revolution broke out in Spain before he died, then he would join the fight.

Around this time, Makhno learned that Peter Arshinov had defected to the Soviet Union, which left him even more isolated from the Ukrainian exiles. Makhno spent his last years writing criticisms of the Bolsheviks and encouraging other anarchists to learn from the mistakes of the Ukrainian experience. His final article, an obituary for his old friend Nikolai Rogdaev, went unsent as Makhno could not afford the postage. As he suffered from malnutrition, Makhno's tuberculosis worsened to the point that he was hospitalized on 16 March 1934. After several operations failed to help, Makhno died in the early hours of 25 July 1934. He was cremated three days after his death; five hundred people attended his funeral at the Père Lachaise Cemetery in Paris.

== Personal life ==
While imprisoned in the 1910s, Makhno received "warm letters" from one Nastia Vasetska, a young peasant woman from Huliaipole. After his return home in 1917, the two met and married, living together on a commune where Makhno contributed but his activism during this time left him "little time for personal affairs". Vasetska was eventually forced to flee Huliaipole after being threatened by Black Guards, taking their child with her. After Makhno himself was forced into exile by the invasion of the Central Powers in early 1918, he managed to reunite with Vasetska in Tsaritsyn, finding her lodging at a nearby farm. Makhno soon left her to continue his travels. They never saw each other again. Their baby died young and, after hearing a rumor that Makhno had also died, Vasetska found another partner.

Following the Makhnovist capture of Huliaipole from the Central Powers in late 1918, Makhno met a local schoolteacher called Halyna Kuzmenko, who became his wife and a leading figure in the Makhnovshchina. With the defeat of the Makhnovist movement, the couple fled to Romania and then on to Poland, where Kuzmenko gave birth to their daughter Elena while she and Makhno were both in prison. The family finally settled in Paris but were forced to live separately for some time due to Makhno's worsening tuberculosis.

Years after Makhno's death, Volin described Makhno's "greatest failing" as being alcohol abuse, claiming that "under the influence of alcohol, he became perverse, over-excitable, unfair, intractable and violent". These claims of alcoholism were disputed by Ida Mett and Makhno's biographer Alexandre Skirda, who respectively noted Makhno's low alcohol tolerance and his enforcement of prohibition during the war. Other biographers, such as Michael Malet and Victor Peters, wrote that Makhno began to drink heavily during the final years of his life, "when he knew that the tuberculosis was killing him anyway".

Makhno's widow and his daughter Elena were deported to Nazi Germany for forced labor during World War II. After the end of the war they were arrested by the Soviet NKVD and taken to Kyiv for trial in 1946. For the crime of "anti-Soviet agitation", Halyna was sentenced to eight years of hard labor in Mordovia and Elena was sentenced to five years in Kazakhstan. Following the death of Stalin, the two were reunited in Taraz, where they spent the rest of their lives: Halyna died in 1978, followed by Elena in 1993. Makhno's relatives in Huliaipole faced harassment by Soviet authorities up until the dissolution of the Soviet Union.

== Legacy ==
The Ukrainian anarchist insurgency continued after Makhno's 1921 flight to Romania. Makhnovist militant groups operated clandestinely throughout the 1920s. Some continued to fight as partisans during World War II. Although the Soviets eventually extinguished the Ukrainian anarchist movement, it experienced a resurgence following the Revolutions of 1989. Various anarchist groups draw on the name of Makhno for inspiration, such as the Revolutionary Confederation of Anarcho-Syndicalists (RKAS), established in Donetsk in 1994.

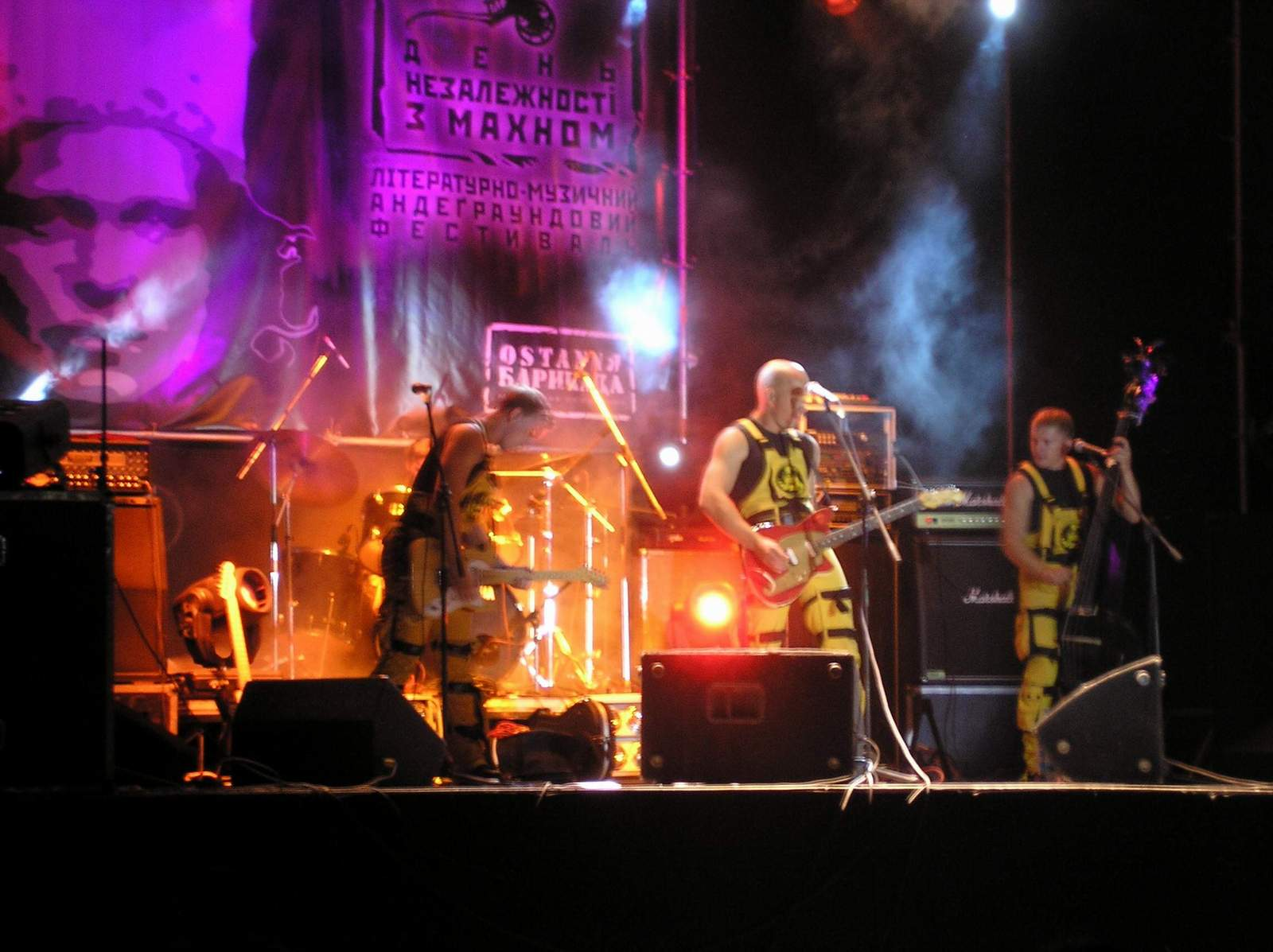
The band Ot Vinta! playing at Makhnofest-2006 in Huliaipole

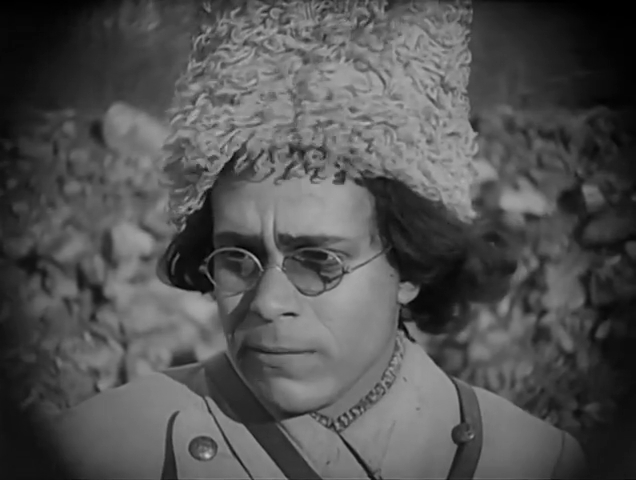
Makhno as portrayed by Vladimir Kucherenko in Red Devils (1923)

Makhno is a local hero in his hometown of Huliaipole, where a statue of him stands in its main town square. The Huliaipole Local History Museum hosts a permanent exhibition dedicated to Makhno. In the late 2010s, the Huliaipole City Council prepared documentation requesting the return of Makhno's ashes from France, as part of a campaign to attract tourists to the city, declaring Makhno to be part of the city's brand. Since the dissolution of the Soviet Union, sections of the Ukrainian far right have also attempted to reclaim Makhno as a Ukrainian nationalist and to downplay his anarchist politics.

Several Soviet and Russian films depicted Makhno, often in a negative light. Makhno was the antagonist in the 1923 Red Devils, portrayed by the Odesa gangster and part-time actor Vladimir Kucherenko. He reprised his role in the 1926 sequel Savur-Mohyla and returned to crime under the pseudonym "Makhno". Boris Chirkov portrayed Makhno in the 1942 epic film Alexander Parkhomenko in which he famously sang the traditional Cossack song "Lovely, brothers, lovely" while drinking vodka. In 1970, Valeri Zolotukhin played Makhno in the drama film Hail, Mary!. Aleksey Tolstoy's novel trilogy The Road to Calvary portrays Makhno as a dangerous deformation of the revolution with a corrupting influence on the morally unstable. Television miniseries adaptations of the novel have also presented Makhno in a negative light. In 2005, a Russian biographical miniseries —The Nine Lives of Nestor Makhno—was produced. The series was noted for its positive portrayal of Makhno, although some reviewers also criticized the series for lacking narrative coherence. Hélène Châtelain directed a 1995 French documentary about Makhno.

Cultural allusions to Makhno in popular media have included a supporting role in Michael Moorcock's 1981 alternative history novel The Steel Tsar, the opening track in the Russian rock band Lyube's 1989 album Alert during the fall of communism in the Eastern Bloc, a song U.S. representative Dana Rohrabacher had written and played for the 1991 official visit of a People's Deputy of Ukraine, and the pseudonym used by the leader of an "anti-yuppie crusade" in San Francisco against perceived gentrification by Silicon Valley.

=== Russian invasion of Ukraine ===
Following the Russian invasion of Ukraine which began in 2022, the legacy of Nestor Makhno and the Makhnovshchina was again taken up by Ukrainian anti-authoritarians that joined the Territorial Defense Forces (TDF). The Ukrainian Armed Forces also adopted the name "Makhno's bow" (Ukrainian: Махновський лук) for their defense forces engaged in the battle of Huliaipole, which has occupied a key place in the line of contact between Ukrainian and Russian-occupied Zaporizhzhia. A museum exhibition on Makhno was damaged during the Russian shelling of Huliaipole; his statue in the town center was protected by sandbags. On 23 May 2024, Ivan Fedorov, the Ukrainian Governor of Zaporizhzhia Oblast, reported that the statue was destroyed by Russian artillery; and on 23 August the museum was reported to have been destroyed after catching fire as a result of Russian strikes on the town. Local authorities spent a month restoring the statue, which was unveiled on 11 September 2024. In London, a group of squatters inspired by Makhno occupied the mansion of Russian oligarch Oleg Deripaska, in an act of protest against the invasion.

== See also ==
- Alexander Antonov – Russian revolutionary and military leader (1889–1922)
- Ricardo Flores Magón – Mexican anarchist, social reform activist, and revolutionary (1874–1922)
- Rummu Jüri – Estonian itinerant and thief
- Svyryd Kotsur – Ukrainian insurgent (1890–1920)
- Stepan Petrichenko – Russian anarcho-syndicalist revolutionary (1892–1947)
- Danylo Terpylo – Ukrainian military commander; leader of the Green armies (1886–1919)
- Emiliano Zapata – Mexican revolutionary (1879–1919)

== Bibliography ==
- Archibald, Malcolm, ed. (2021). "Translator's Introduction to Nestor Makhno's Memoirs of his Early Life". Young Rebels against the Empire. Black Cat Press. pp. vii–xv. ISBN 978-1-926878-24-9.
- Avrich, Paul (1988). "Nestor Makhno: The Man and the Myth". Anarchist Portraits. Princeton: Princeton University Press. pp. 111–124. ISBN 978-0-691-04753-9. OCLC 17727270.
- Chamberlin, William Henry (1987) [1935]. "Ukraina, Whirlpool of Peasant Anarchism". The Russian Revolution. Vol. II. Princeton: Princeton University Press. pp. 221–241. ISBN 0-691-05493-2. OCLC 311567963.
- Darch, Colin (2020). Nestor Makhno and Rural Anarchism in Ukraine, 1917–1921. London: Pluto Press. ISBN 978-1786805263. OCLC 1225942343.
- Footman, David (1961). "Makhno". Civil War in Russia. Praeger Publications in Russian History and World Communism. Vol. 114. New York: Praeger. pp. 245–302. OCLC 254495418.
- Kenez, Peter (1992). "Pogroms and White ideology in the Russian Civil War". In Klier, John D.; Lambroza, Shlomo (eds.). Pogroms: Anti-Jewish Violence in Modern Russian History. Cambridge: Cambridge University Press. pp. 293–313. ISBN 0521405327. OCLC 895464910.
- Lincoln, William Bruce (1989). "The Ukraine in Ferment". Red Victory: A History of the Russian Civil War. New York: Simon & Schuster. pp. 302–328. ISBN 0-671-63166-7. OCLC 795310657.
- Malet, Michael (1982). Nestor Makhno in the Russian Civil War. London: Palgrave Macmillan. ISBN 978-0-333-25969-6. OCLC 8514426.
- Palij, Michael (1976). The Anarchism of Nestor Makhno, 1918–1921: An Aspect of the Ukrainian Revolution. Publications on Russia and Eastern Europe. Seattle: University of Washington Press. ISBN 978-0-295-95511-7. OCLC 81941010.
- Patterson, Sean (2020). Makhno and Memory: Anarchist and Mennonite Narratives of Ukraine's Civil War, 1917–1921. Manitoba: University of Manitoba Press. ISBN 978-0-88755-578-7. OCLC 1134608930.
- Peters, Victor (1970). Nestor Makhno: The Life of an Anarchist. Winnipeg: Echo Books. OCLC 7925080.
- Shubin, Aleksandr (2010). "The Makhnovist Movement and the National Question in the Ukraine, 1917–1921". In Hirsch, Steven J.; van der Walt, Lucien (eds.). Anarchism and Syndicalism in the Colonial and Postcolonial World, 1870–1940. Studies in Global Social History. Vol. 6. Leiden: Brill. pp. 147–191. ISBN 978-9004188495. OCLC 868808983.
- Skirda, Alexandre (2004) [1982]. Nestor Makhno–Anarchy's Cossack: The Struggle for Free Soviets in the Ukraine 1917–1921. Translated by Sharkey, Paul. Oakland, California: AK Press. ISBN 978-1-902593-68-5. OCLC 60602979.
- Sysyn, Frank (1977). "Nestor Makhno and the Ukrainian Revolution". In Hunczak, Taras (ed.). The Ukraine, 1917–1921: A Study in Revolution. Cambridge, Massachusetts: Harvard University Press. pp. 271–304. ISBN 978-0674920095. OCLC 942852423. Archived from the original on 23 September 2015.
