= Savelii Makhno =

Ukrainian anarcho-communist (1872–1920)

Savelii Ivanovych Makhno
- Савелій Іванович Махно
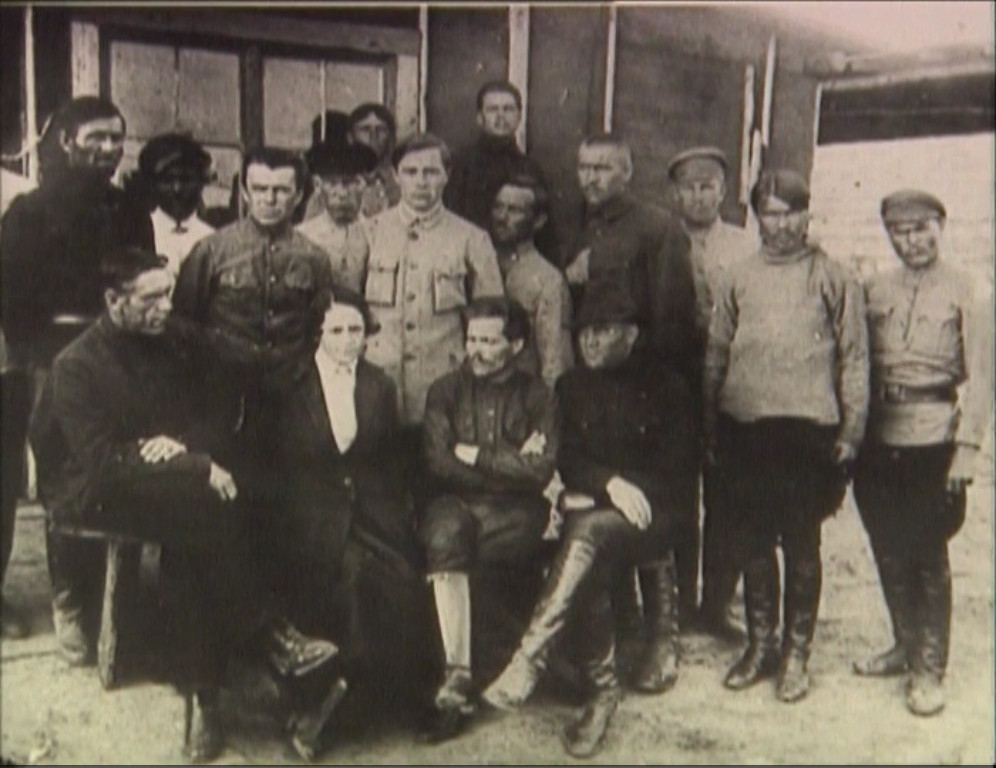
- possibly Savelii Makhno, 1919, sitting in first row next to Nestor Makhno
- Born: 2 December 1872; Huliaipole, Yekaterinoslav, Russian Empire
- Died: 21 February 1920 (aged 47–48); Huliaipole, Yekaterinoslav, Ukrainian SSR
- Military career
- Allegiance: Russian Empire (1904–1905); Ukrainian People's Republic of Soviets (1917–1918); Makhnovshchina (1918–1920)
- Service: Imperial Russian Army (1904–1905); Black Guards (1917–1918); Revolutionary Insurgent Army of Ukraine (1918–1920)
- Service years: 1904–1920
- Nickname: Savva
- Conflicts: Russo-Japanese War; Ukrainian War of Independence

Savelii Ivanovych Makhno (1872 – 21 February 1920) was a Ukrainian anarcho-communist, member of the Makhnovist movement, and brother of Nestor Makhno.

== Biography ==
Savelii Makhno was born on 2 December 1872 in Huliaipole to a poor peasant family. Shortly after the birth of his younger brother Nestor, Savelii's father died, leaving he and his brothers in the care of his mother. By the turn of the 20th century, Savelii was married to Theodora and had 7 children - Thomas, Paul, Ivan, Gregory, Anastasia, Evdokia and Maria.

In 1904, Savelii was called up to serve in the Imperial Russian Army and set off to fight in the Russo-Japanese War. After returning home during the 1905 Revolution, he joined the anarcho-communist Union of Poor Peasants in 1907. Savelii's brother Nestor was arrested and imprisoned for his own activities in the Union, only being released following the February Revolution. Upon Nestor's return to Huliaipole, he was greeted by Savelii, along with his mother and his elder brother Omelian, and they set about reorganising the town's anarchist movement. Over the subsequent months, Savelii participated in the foundation of a libertarian society in Huliaipole.

Following the October Revolution, a civil war broke out in Ukraine, as the forces of the Central Council of Ukraine and the Ukrainian People's Republic of Soviets struggled to take power. The Huliaipole Soviet resolved to intervene against the Ukrainian nationalists, which were threatening the nearby city of Oleksandrivsk. On 4 January 1918, a 800-strong detachment of Black Guards was established in Huliaipole, with Savelii elected as its commander, and they set by train off towards Oleksandrivsk, where they linked up with the Red Guards under the command of Semyon Bogdanov.

After a few days of fighting, the city was captured from the nationalists by the combined Soviet forces. A revolutionary committee was subsequently established as the city's centre of power, with Nestor Makhno and Maria Nikiforova being elected to prominent positions. Savelii's Black Guards occupied the Kichkassky bridge across the Dnieper and began to disarm the Cossacks who were leaving the front. But following the ratification of the Treaty of Brest-Litovsk and the subsequent advance of the Central Powers through Ukraine, Savelii left Oleksandrivsk with his detachment and returned to Huliaipole for reorganization.

This is how the Izvestiya newspaper described the situation of Savelii's family during the period of the Austro-German occupation:

It is difficult to describe all the torments that the Makhno family suffered. Even the tiny three- or four-year-old children of Savelii Makhno, one of Nestor Makhno's brothers, were not left alone and they took off their last shirts on the streets, saying: "This is German, give it back!" They came to them several times, kicked them out of the huts, intending to burn them, put them off again, then two days later they started again with the same thing and, finally, burned and blew up the walls themselves.

After the arrival of the Germans, Savelii disappeared in an unknown direction. In April 1918, Savelii participated in an anarchist conference in Taganrog, where it was decided that insurgents would return to Ukraine by July 1918 and carry out an insurrection against the occupying powers. Savelii resolved to return immediately and crossed back over the front lines into southern Ukraine, but he was captured and imprisoned in Oleksandrivsk. Nestor learnt of his brother's arrest upon his own return to Ukraine in July.

By November 1918, Nestor's Revolutionary Insurgent Army had driven the Austrian forces out of Huliaipole and established a free soviet to coordinate the local workers, peasants and insurgents. They immediately set about attempting to secure the release of anarchist prisoners, including Savelii, but the Ukrainian State stalled on the negotiations. But following the Armistice of 11 November 1918 and the subsequent overthrow of Pavlo Skoropadskyi by the Directorate, the new Ukrainian authorities declared an amnesty for all political prisoners and Savelii was finally released on 14 December.

Upon his return, Savelii joined the Makhnovshchina as an officer in the supply services. He was later elected by a Regional Congress to head the supply department, which oversaw the confiscation of property from the local bourgeoisie. Following the capture of Huliaipole by the Armed Forces of South Russia in June 1919, Savelii's wife was tortured and then executed by officers of the White movement. Makhno subsequently ordered Vasyl Kurylenko to personally track down and exact revenge against his wife's killers, which he carried out swiftly.

Following the conquest of eastern Ukraine by the Red Army in January 1920, the 13th Red Army carried out a surprise attack against the Makhnovists in Huliaipole, liquidating the local forces in an operation directed against the Insurgent Army's general staff. Savelii was captured during the operation and shot by soldiers of the 42nd Rifle Division on 21 February 1920.

== Bibliography ==
- Archibald, Malcolm (2007). Atamansha: the Story of Maria Nikiforova, the Anarchist Joan of Arc. Dublin: Black Cat Press. ISBN 978-0-9737827-0-7. OCLC 239359065.
- Belash, Alexander Viktorovich; Belash, Victor Fedorovich (1993). Дороги Нестора Махно (in Russian). Kyiv: РВЦ "Проза". ISBN 9785770738148. OCLC 429142607.
- Danilov, Victor Petrovich (2006). Нестор Махно: Крестьянское движение на Украине, 1918—1921: Документы и материалы (PDF) (in Russian). Moscow: ROSSPEN. ISBN 9785824307696. OCLC 741204339.
- Malet, Michael (1982). Nestor Makhno in the Russian Civil War. London: Palgrave Macmillan. ISBN 978-0-333-25969-6. OCLC 8514426.
- Palij, Michael (1976). The Anarchism of Nestor Makhno, 1918–1921. Seattle, WA. United states: University of Washington Press. ISBN 0-295-95511-2. OCLC 2372742.
- Skirda, Alexandre (2004). Nestor Makhno: Anarchy's Cossack, the struggle for free Soviets in the Ukraine 1917-1921. Oakland, Ca. United States: AK Press. ISBN 978-1-902593-68-5. OCLC 1902593685.
