= Makhno and Memory =

2020 book by Sean Patterson

- Author: Sean Patterson
- Subject: History
- Publisher: University of Manitoba Press
- Publication date: 2020
- Pages: 218
- ISBN: 9780887558382

Makhno and Memory: Anarchist and Mennonite Narratives of Ukraine's Civil War, 1917–1921, is a history book by Sean Patterson on Nestor Makhno and the Makhnovist movement. The book discusses competing Makhnovist and Mennonite narratives of the Russian Civil War, and purports to shed new light on the Eichenfeld massacre, where Makhnovist forces killed Mennonite colonists.
