= Elena Mikhnenko =

Ukrainian exile (1922–1993)

- Елена Михненко
- Born: Elena Nestorovna Mikhnenko; 30 October 1922; Warsaw, Second Polish Republic (present-day Poland)
- Died: 16 January 1993 (aged 70); Jambyl, Kazakhstan
- Other name: Lucie
- Citizenship: Stateless
- Criminal charges: Anti-Soviet agitation
- Parents: Nestor Makhno (father); Halyna Kuzmenko (mother)

Elena Nestorovna Mikhnenko (Russian: Елена Несторовна Михненко; (Note: Also known by Олена Несторівна Міхненко, Olena Nestorivna Mikhnenko in Ukrainian.) 1922–1993) was the daughter of the Ukrainian anarchist revolutionaries Nestor Makhno and Halyna Kuzmenko. Born in exile, she spent her early life in France, where she was living at the outbreak of World War II. Following the occupation of France, Mikhnenko was captured and conscripted into forced labour in Nazi Germany. She was subsequently arrested by Soviet state security, which first imprisoned her for "anti-Soviet agitation" and then exiled her to the Kazakh Soviet Socialist Republic. She lived and worked in Kazakhstan for the rest of her life.

== Biography ==
=== Birth and early life ===
Elena Mikhnenko's parents, Nestor Makhno (Note: Nestor Makhno's family name was originally Mikhnenko, but his father took the abbreviated version "Makhno" and registered his children's births under that name. When he fled into exile, Nestor re-assumed the name "Mikhnenko" and had documents issued to him under that name.) and Halyna Kuzmenko, were leading figures in the Makhnovist movement, which attempted to establish anarchist communism in southern Ukraine. They met at the height of the Ukrainian War of Independence, in which the Makhnovists were defeated by the Bolsheviks, forcing Makhno and Kuzmenko to flee into exile. They briefly stayed in Romania, before moving on to Poland, where they were interned separately on charges of plotting an anti-Polish uprising in Galicia.

On 30 October 1922, Mikhnenko was born in Warsaw's Pawiak prison, where her mother was being held, while her father was himself imprisoned in Mokotów Prison. At their trial the following year, the couple were acquitted, released from prison and permitted to stay in Poland. In July 1924, they moved to the Free City of Danzig, where the whole family was arrested on charges of Makhno's alleged persecution of German Mennonites in Ukraine. Halyna was quickly released and fled to Paris with Elena, while Makhno himself escaped from prison and made his way to France through Germany.

=== Life in France ===
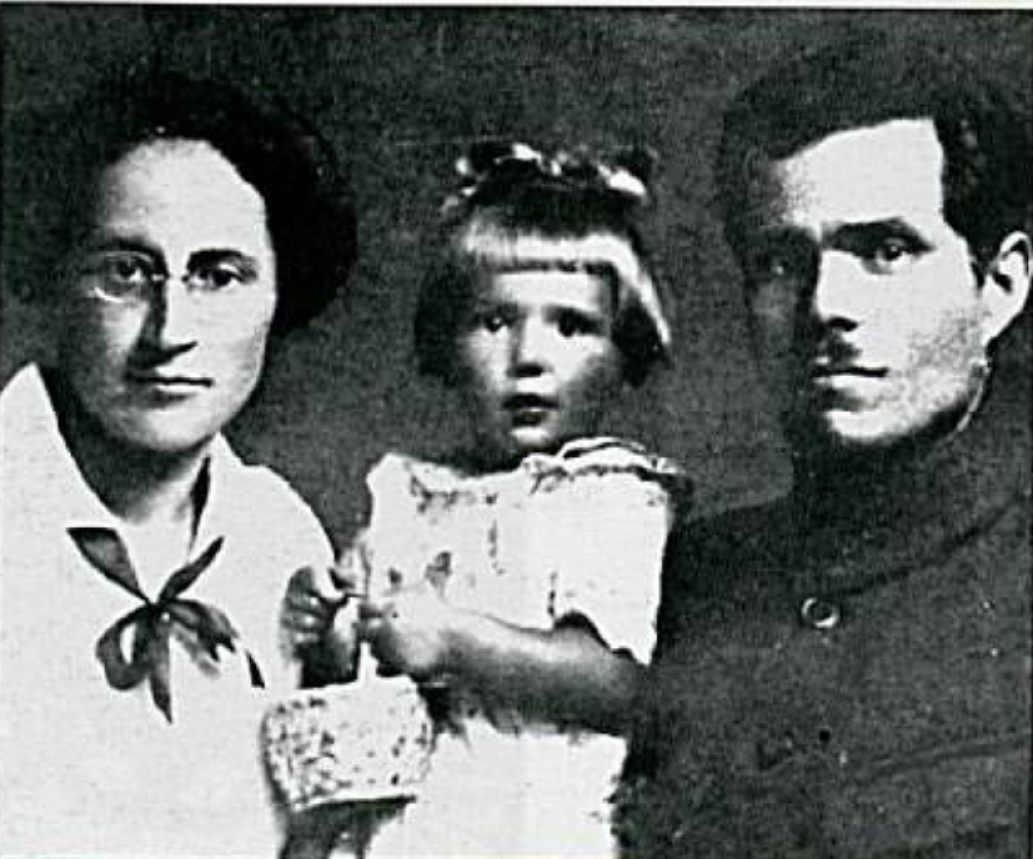
A young Elena (center) with her mother Halyna Kuzmenko (left) and her father Nestor Makhno (right)

By 1925, the family had arrived in Paris, where Elena lived for most of her formative years, helping out in her mother's grocery store in Vincennes. The strain of life in exile caused the family to quickly fall apart, with Makhno and Kuzmenko frequently separating. Elena spent most of her early years with her mother, rarely ever getting a chance to connect with her father. The families of French anarchists often looked after the young Elena, giving her the Francised pet name of "Lucie". She thus grew up speaking the French language, eventually forgetting how to speak Russian and never even learning how to speak Ukrainian.

French police file on Mikhnenko and her parents

Sick and in poverty, her father was financially supported by the French anarchist movement, but spent most of this money on Elena. Le Libertaire, which had been tasked with financially supporting Makhno's family, paid out 123 francs to Makhno, 100 to Kuzmenko and 300 to Elena. In 1929, Elena was taken on holiday by her father to the southern coastal town of Aimargues, which was well-known for its relatively large anarchist community. In March 1934, her father finally succumbed to his tuberculosis, leaving his daughter with the final words "be healthy and happy, my daughter", before he died in his sleep. Of the 500 mourners that attended his funeral, largely from the international anarchist movement, Elena and her mother were the only Ukrainians present. Due to her father's political activities, Elena came to reject politics at a young age, pledging that she would "take no interest in politics or newspapers".

=== Forced labour and exile ===
In 1939, Elena graduated from secondary school and got a job in textile manufacturing. Following the Nazi invasion of France, she was conscripted into forced labour and transferred to Berlin, where she worked as a drafter for Siemens and as a German-French translator. She was followed there by her mother, who tried unsuccessfully to return to Ukraine. Ida Mett claimed they were killed in an air raid on Berlin, but this was quickly confirmed to be untrue following the end of the war. On 14 August 1945, after the fall of Berlin, Elena and her mother were arrested by the Soviet state security and transferred to Kyiv. While imprisoned in the Ukrainian capital, Elena slapped a fellow inmate after they asked if her father was "the renowned bandit".

Elena was accused of collaboration with the Nazis, which she denied and which state security service could not prove. Although also found to be uninformed about her father's past activities in Ukraine, Elena was sentenced to five years for "anti-Soviet agitation" and subsequently exiled to Jambyl, in the Kazakh Soviet Socialist Republic.

While surveilled by the authorities, she found employment doing manual labour in the city's canteens, factories and pig farms. She was often blocked from promotions, or even dismissed, after her employers learnt that her father was Nestor Makhno. This fact also kept her single for most of her life, as men often left her upon discovering her father's identity.

=== Later years ===
On 12 September 1950, Elena was released from her imposed exile. Following the death of Stalin in 1953, Elena was joined in Jambyl by her mother, but it had been so long since they had been together that they initially did not recognize each other upon Kuzmenko's arrival. They stayed together in the Kazakh city, in poverty and under constant surveillance by the KGB. At this time, Soviet journalists from Moscow and Leningrad started arriving in Kazakhstan, specifically looking for an interview with Elena Mikhnenko, which she usually refused.

In 1968, Elena reluctantly accepted to be interviewed by the Russian historian Sergey Semanov, who described her as "edgy, irritated and trusted no one." During the interview, Elena reportedly spoke Russian with a thick Parisian accent. She declared that she felt she had no homeland, neither in France nor the Soviet Union, but nevertheless asked Semanov to send her some French newspapers, which she was unable to get in Kazakhstan. Other journalists that met Elena described her as a "real Parisian" who was always well-dressed, even while living in poverty, and carried herself with a certain kind of chic. Semanov also interviewed her mother, who according to Vladimir Litvinov had attempted to avoid "complicating the lives of herself and her daughter with stories that denied the official historiography." Kuzmenko died in Jambyl the following decade.

Although for a time she lived together with a civil aviation pilot, who some sources state she married, Elena remained childless into old age. She consciously decided not to have children, as she feared they would share her fate of ostracisation for the identity of her father, declaring that she did not want to "breed poverty". She eventually graduated from Jambyl's Hydro-Melioration Institute, where she worked as an engineer for the rest of her life. In 1990, she was formally rehabilitated during the period of perestroika. In 1993, following the dissolution of the Soviet Union, Elena Mikhnenko died in Jambyl, at the age of 70.

== Bibliography ==
- Darch, Colin (2020). Nestor Makhno and Rural Anarchism in Ukraine, 1917–1921. London: Pluto Press. ISBN 9781786805263. OCLC 1225942343.
- Malet, Michael (1982). Nestor Makhno in the Russian Civil War. London: Palgrave Macmillan. ISBN 978-0-333-25969-6. OCLC 8514426.
- Moiseeva, Olga (7 November 2022). "Почему дочери Нестора Махно в Советском Союзе не разрешали учиться в институте" [Why Nestor Makhno's daughter was not allowed to study in the Soviet Union]. Novy Ochag (in Russian).
- Peters, Victor (1970). Nestor Makhno: The Life of an Anarchist. Winnipeg: Echo Books. OCLC 7925080.
- Skirda, Alexandre (2004) [1982]. Nestor Makhno–Anarchy's Cossack: The Struggle for Free Soviets in the Ukraine 1917–1921. Translated by Sharkey, Paul. Oakland: AK Press. ISBN 978-1-902593-68-5. OCLC 60602979.
- Syromyatnikov, Nikolai (27 January 2021). "Елена Михненко: что стало с дочерью Нестора Махно" [Elena Mikhnenko: what happened to Nestor Makhno's daughter]. Russkaya Semerka (in Russian).
- Zdorovets, Natalya (27 April 2023). ""Продлить срок ссылки оснований нет"" ["There is no reason to extend the period of exile"]. Nasha Gazeta (in Russian).
