= University of Manitoba Press =

Academic publishing house

- Parent company: University of Manitoba
- Founded: 1967
- Country of origin: Canada
- Headquarters location: 301 St. John’s College, 92 Dysart Road, Winnipeg, MB
- Distribution: International
- Key people: David Carr, Director; Glenn Bergen, Managing Editor
- Publication types: Books
- Official website: uofmpress.ca

The University of Manitoba Press (UMP) is an academic publishing house based at the University of Manitoba in Winnipeg. Founded in 1967, the UMP is the first university press in western Canada.

Publishing 12 to 14 books a year, UMP is regarded as a leading publisher of books with a focus on Indigenous history, Indigenous studies, and Canadiana. Editorially, the Press has given focus to such subjects as the Arctic and the North; ethnic and immigration studies; Indigenous languages; Canadian literary studies (especially Indigenous literature); and environmental, land use, and food studies.

== Organization ==
Its distribution is handled by UTP Distribution in Canada; Michigan State University Press in the US; and Eurospan Group internationally (EMEA, Asia-Pacific, Latin America, Caribbean).

UMP's publishing program is supported by the federal government via the Canada Book Fund, the Council for the Arts, and the Awards to Scholarly Publications Program (funded by the Social Sciences and Humanities Research Council); the provincial government via the Department of Sport, Culture, and Heritage, the Manitoba Arts Council, and the Manitoba Book Publishing Tax Credit; and Livres Canada Books.

UMP is also a member of the Association of Canadian University Presses.

== Publications ==
The University of Manitoba Press publishes 12 to 14 books a year, with its selection process involving a scholarly peer review; all UMP books go through rigorous review by external experts, followed by a review by the UMP editorial board.

The Press publishes various works exploring Indigenous history and studies (such as cultures of the Inuit, Anishinaabe, Cree, and Métis); Canadiana (such as Canadian history and literature), especially the culture and history of the Canadian Prairies; and Canadian-immigrant cultures (such as Italian, Japanese, Ukrainian, and Icelandic). In addition, it has given focus to such subjects as the Arctic and the North; ethnic studies; Indigenous languages; Canadian literary studies (especially Indigenous literature); and environmental, land use, and food studies.

UMP has also published academic works, such as the political history of Manitoba and the laws of early Iceland (translated into English), the latter first published by UMP in 1980.

=== Book series ===
Series of the University of Manitoba Press, 2021
| Series | Description | Series editor | ISSN |
|---|---|---|---|
| Contemporary Studies on the North | This series publishes books that expand common understandings of Northern Canada and "its position within the circumpolar region," through new research that "incorporates multidisciplinary studies on northern peoples, cultures, geographies, histories, politics, religions, and economies." | Christopher Trott | 1928-1722 |
| Critical Studies in Native History | This series publishes books that explore the historical experience of Indigenous people through the lens of critical theory. | Jarvis Brownlie | 1925-5888 |
| First Voices, First Texts | This series introduces "some of the most important Indigenous literature of the past, much of which has been unavailable for decades," through "newly re-edited texts that are presented with particular sensitivity towards Indigenous ethics, traditions, and contemporary realities." | Warren Cariou | 2291-9627 |
| Human Rights and Social Justice Series | This series publishes works that explore "the quest for social justice" and for basic rights and freedoms, including civil and political rights, economic, social, and cultural rights, and collective rights. | Karen Busby and Rhonda Hinther | 2291-6024 |
| Perceptions on Truth and Reconciliation | This series purposes to "bridge the knowledge gap between Western and Indigenous approaches to addressing historical and ongoing injustices in settler colonial states, repairing harms, and mitigating conflict across all levels and sectors of society." | N/A | 2371-347X |
| Publications of the Algonquian Text Society | This collection is limited to texts presented in the form of critical editions that originate from the UManitoba Linguistics Department. | N/A | 0829-755X |
| Studies in Immigration and Culture | This series publishes historical works that elaborate on the "Canadian and transnational immigrant experience in both urban and rural contexts," especially focusing on the "cultural adjustments of the migrants," including their ethnic, religious, gender, class, racial, or intergenerational identities and relations. | Royden Loewen | 1914-1459 |
| University of Manitoba Icelandic Studies | This collection provides critical editions that focus on "early Western European sagas and legal texts." | N/A | 0709-2997 |
