= Bolshevik–Makhnovist conflict =

1920–21 political and military conflict in southern Ukraine

- Part of the Ukrainian War of Independence and the Red Terror
Date	First phase: 9 January – 2 October 1920; Second phase: 26 November 1920 – 28 August 1921
Location	Ukraine
Result	Bolshevik victory: Makhnovshchina liquidated; Insurgent core flees to Romania; Low-level insurgency persists throughout the early 1920s

Belligerents
(Russian Soviet Federative Socialist Republic) Russian SFSR (Ukrainian Soviet Socialist Republic) Ukrainian SSR	Makhnovshchina

Commanders and leaders
(Russian Soviet Federative Socialist Republic) Leon Trotsky (Russian Soviet Federative Socialist Republic) Mikhail Frunze (WIA) (Russian Soviet Federative Socialist Republic) Lev Kamenev (Russian Soviet Federative Socialist Republic) Semyon Budyonny (Russian Soviet Federative Socialist Republic) Semyon Timoshenko (Russian Soviet Federative Socialist Republic) Marcian Germanovich (Russian Soviet Federative Socialist Republic) Alexander Parkhomenko † (Russian Soviet Federative Socialist Republic) Vladimir Nesterovich (Russian Soviet Federative Socialist Republic) Vitaly Primakov (Russian Soviet Federative Socialist Republic) Grigory Kotovsky (Russian Soviet Federative Socialist Republic) Konstantin Avksentevsky (Russian Soviet Federative Socialist Republic) Roberts Eidemanis (Russian Soviet Federative Socialist Republic) Vasily Blyukher (Russian Soviet Federative Socialist Republic) Nikita Khrushchev	(Makhnovshchina) Nestor Makhno (WIA) (Makhnovshchina) Viktor Bilash (POW) (Makhnovshchina) Fedir Shchus † (Makhnovshchina) Foma Kozhyn † (Makhnovshchina) Vasyl Kurylenko † (Makhnovshchina) Mykhailo Brova † (Makhnovshchina) Grigori Maslakov † (Makhnovshchina) Semen Karetnyk (executed) (Makhnovshchina) Dmitry Popov (executed) (Makhnovshchina) Vasyl Sharovsky (surrendered) (Makhnovshchina) Oleksandr Kalashnykov †

Units involved
Red Army: 4th Army; 6th Army; 13th Army; 1st Cavalry Army; 2nd Cavalry Army	Revolutionary Insurgent Army of Ukraine

Strength
150,000	50,000

Casualties and losses
- c. 1.5 million deaths

The Bolshevik–Makhnovist conflict was a period of political and military conflict between the Ukrainian Soviet Socialist Republic and the Makhnovshchina, for control over southern Ukraine. The Bolsheviks aimed to eliminate the Makhnovshchina and neutralise its peasant base. In turn, the Makhnovists fought against the implementation of the Red Terror and the policy of war communism.

The conflict broke out after the Red Army returned to Ukraine in early 1920, following the defeat of the White advance on Moscow. It attacked the Makhnovshchina, which at the time occupied most of southern Ukraine, and carried out a sustained attempt to pacify the region. After a brief truce, in order to ensure the final defeat of the White movement, the Red Army again attacked the Makhnovshchina in November 1920, leading to a resumption of hostilities.

The conflict mainly consisted of guerrilla warfare, without conventional maneuvers or open battles. It was also highly mobile, with territory regularly changing hands between the two. The Bolsheviks largely maintained territorial control, while the Makhnovists were kept on the defensive. In this condition, the Makhnovists were not able to carry out offensives, instead mostly attacking isolated Red units.

Following the implementation of the New Economic Policy and the onset of fatigue due to the conditions of the war, support for the Makhnovist insurrection began to dwindle. Despite efforts by the Makhnovists to reorganise and carry out larger offensives, by August 1921, the Makhnovshchina had effectively been wiped out. Its core around Nestor Makhno fled into exile, while a low-level insurgency persisted throughout the 1920s.

== Background ==
The advent of the October Revolution caused the outbreak of civil war in Ukraine, as the forces of the Central Council and the Soviets struggled to take power in the country. When the Ukrainian nationalists seized control of Oleksandrivsk, the local Bolsheviks and Left Socialist-Revolutionaries appealed for support from Ukrainian anarchists to reestablish Soviet power in the city. From the nearby town of Huliaipole, an 800-strong detachment of Black Guards, led by Savely Makhno, reinforced the Red Guards and retook the city for the Soviets. The gains of the Ukrainian Soviet Republic were lost after the Central Council signed a peace treaty with the Central Powers and invited them to invade Ukraine, with the Bolshevik government in Moscow later signing their own peace treaty with the Central Powers, formally ceding control of Ukraine. By April 1918, after months of fighting against the imperial advance, the anarchists lost control of Huliaipole and were driven out of Ukraine.

After regrouping their forces in Taganrog, the anarchists resolved to return to Ukraine and fight a war of independence against the Central Powers, with Nestor Makhno soliciting the aid of Vladimir Lenin himself in making their return. In July 1918, the Ukrainian anarchists ignited their insurrection against the Central Powers, defeating the Austro-Hungarian Army at Dibrivka and eventually retaking Huliaipole. By November 1918, the Central Powers had surrendered and subsequently withdrawn from Ukraine, leaving the region of Pryazovia under the control of the Makhnovshchina.

While the Makhnovshchina set about establishing libertarian communism in their captured territory and the anarchist armed forces fought on multiple fronts against the White movement, Don Cossacks and Directorate of Ukraine, the Bolsheviks finally broke the Treaty of Brest-Litovsk and ordered the Red Army to invade Ukraine, with Christian Rakovsky proclaiming the establishment of the Ukrainian Soviet Socialist Republic in Kharkiv. When a nationalist counteroffensive forced the Makhnovists to retreat to Huliaipole, they undertook a complete reorganization of their forces on every front, eventually culminating with their integration into the Ukrainian Soviet Army as the 3rd Trans-Dnieper Brigade, with Nestor Makhno subordinating himself to the command of Pavel Dybenko.

Despite the integration, tensions between the Bolsheviks and the Makhnovists heightened over time, as the autonomy of the Makhnovshchina was increasingly attacked by their Bolshevik commanders. Vladimir Antonov-Ovseenko and Lev Kamenev attempted to resolve the dispute after Dybenko proscribed a Makhnovist conference. But after Nykyfor Hryhoriv mutinied against the Bolsheviks, tensions between the two factions culminated with the Makhnovists being declared outlaws and Makhno resigning his command within the Red Army.

The advance of the Armed Forces of South Russia subsequently forced the Makhnovists to retreat west to Kherson, while the Bolsheviks quit Ukraine entirely following the fall of Kharkiv. In Kherson, the Makhnovists reconstituted themselves as an independent force, the Revolutionary Insurgent Army of Ukraine, and defeated the Volunteer Army at the Battle of Perehonivka, allowing them to capture most of southern Ukraine and halting the White advance on Moscow. While the Makhnovists were beset by epidemic typhus and attempting to hold off attacks by the White movement, the Red Army returned to Ukraine once again.

== First phase (January–September 1920) ==
Map of Ukraine, depicting the Makhnovshchina's rough area of control before the Bolshevik invasion in January 1920

Under pressure by the advancing Makhnovists, on 30 December, Slaschov's White forces finally quit Katerynoslav province and retreated to Crimea, where they built a new base of operations. The remainder of White forces were split between Odesa and the Don, with their supply lines through Pryazovia cut off by the Insurgent Army. With the White movement falling into a retreat, the territories that had been cleared by the Insurgent Army were subsequently occupied by the Red Army. In the cities of Ukraine, the Bolsheviks began to carry out a political struggle against dissident communists, such as the national communists and the Group of Democratic Centralism, who they denounced as Makhnovists.

In the first week of January 1920, the 14th Red Army took the cities of Katerynoslav, Chaplyne, Mariupol, Oleksandrivsk, Huliaipole and Berdiansk, all without resistance. On 4 January, the Red commander Ieronim Uborevich split up his divisions: the 41st Division was quartered in the insurgent capital of Huliaipole, while the 45th Division was sent west towards Kherson, where they were ordered to wipe out any Insurgent detachments encountered and to disarm the local populace. The Makhnovists had underestimated the rapid advance of the Red Army, with Peter Arshinov later analyzing that a tactical error had been made by the insurgents in not establishing a front from Oryol to Poltava. Instead of reinforcing their northern front, the Makhnovists had diverted their attention towards the reconstruction of Ukraine along anarcho-communist lines, with their only resistance to the Red advance consisting of propaganda leaflets.

On 5 January, the commander of the 45th Division met with the insurgent commanders Nestor Makhno and Semen Karetnyk in Oleksandrivsk, culminating with the two sides holding a joint assembly, in which they agreed to join forces against the White movement. But despite the initial mutual amicability of the encounter, the Bolsheviks soon made it clear that they were hostile to any political negotiations. On 7 January, the Insurgent Army published a declaration To all Peasants and Workers of Ukraine!, calling for a "Pan-Ukrainian Congress of Workers and Peasants" to self-organize a new order in the country. In the declaration, the Makhnovists further proposed: the rescinding of all White edicts; the redistribution of private property and enterprise to the peasants and workers respectively; the establishment of "free soviets" outside of political party control; the institution of civil liberties; the abolition of state police; the dual use of both the Soviet ruble and Ukrainian hryvnia as currencies; and the construction of a barter economy. This proclamation was met with opposition by the Bolsheviks, who declared: "Long live the worldwide Bolshevik Communist Party! Long live the Third International! Down with anarchy!"

=== Bolshevik attack ===
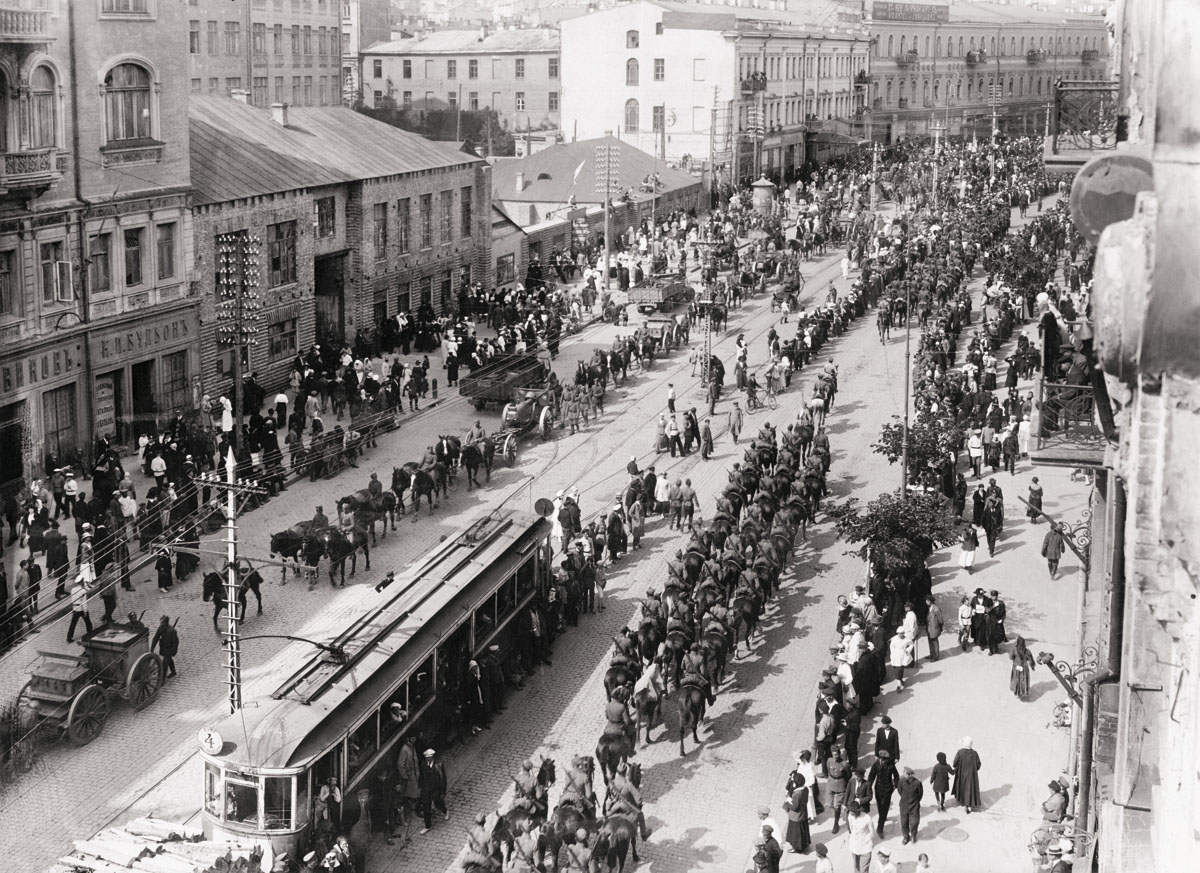
Polish troops in Kyiv, during the Polish–Soviet War

On 8 January, Uboverich ordered the Insurgents to surrender and be integrated into the ranks of the 12th Red Army, in order to join the fight in the Polish–Soviet War. Beset by epidemic typhus and more inclined to fight on their home turf than in western Ukraine, the Insurgent Army responded with a categorical rejection of the order, just as the Bolshevik command had anticipated. The following day, the All-Ukrainian Central Executive Committee issued a decree against Makhno and the Insurgent Army, declaring them to be outlawed for insubordination. Before the decree had even been published, Estonian and Latvian Riflemen started disarming the Makhnovists that they encountered. The Bolsheviks also initiated an anti-Makhnovist propaganda campaign, de-emphasising the insurgent role in the defeat of the Whites and accusing them of having caused the earlier Soviet defeat in the battle for Donbas.

As hostilities with the Red Army resumed, the Military Revolutionary Council was disbanded and its members went underground, while other prominent anarchists, such as Volin, were arrested by the Cheka. By 15 January, the Red Army had occupied Nikopol, where 15,000 insurgents were sick with typhus, shooting the Makhnovist commanders stationed there and capturing large amounts of war material. Towards the end of January, the 13th Army attacked Huliaipole, during which they killed Savely Makhno, took 300 prisoners of war and captured a substantial amount of the insurgents' military equipment. Further attacks against the Makhnovists were carried out by divisions from Estonia, Latvia and China, due to their lack of ties to Ukraine, resulting in the perceived liquidation of the Insurgent Army. Following the capture of Huliaipole and the dispersal of the insurgent staff, the Southwestern Front declared victory over the Makhnovshchina on 9 February.

=== Red Terror ===
With the insurgent army taken care of, the Bolsheviks turned their attention towards carrying out the Red Terror in Ukraine, with Leon Trotsky himself ordering that all supporters of the partisans be "mercilessly punish[ed]". The Cheka were moved into the villages, where they killed all the local Makhnovists and installed Communist Party officials in power. The Cheka then set about disarming the local populace, taking villagers hostage while their troops set about searching homes and killing the hostages if they found any unreported weaponry. Petro Hryhorenko would later state that "there was no end of bloodshed", drawing attention to reports of one massacre in the Makhnovist town of Novospasivka, where the Cheka had "shot down one in every two able-bodied men". In what Alexandre Skirda described as an act of "outright genocide", an estimated 200,000 Ukrainian peasants were killed during the Red Terror.

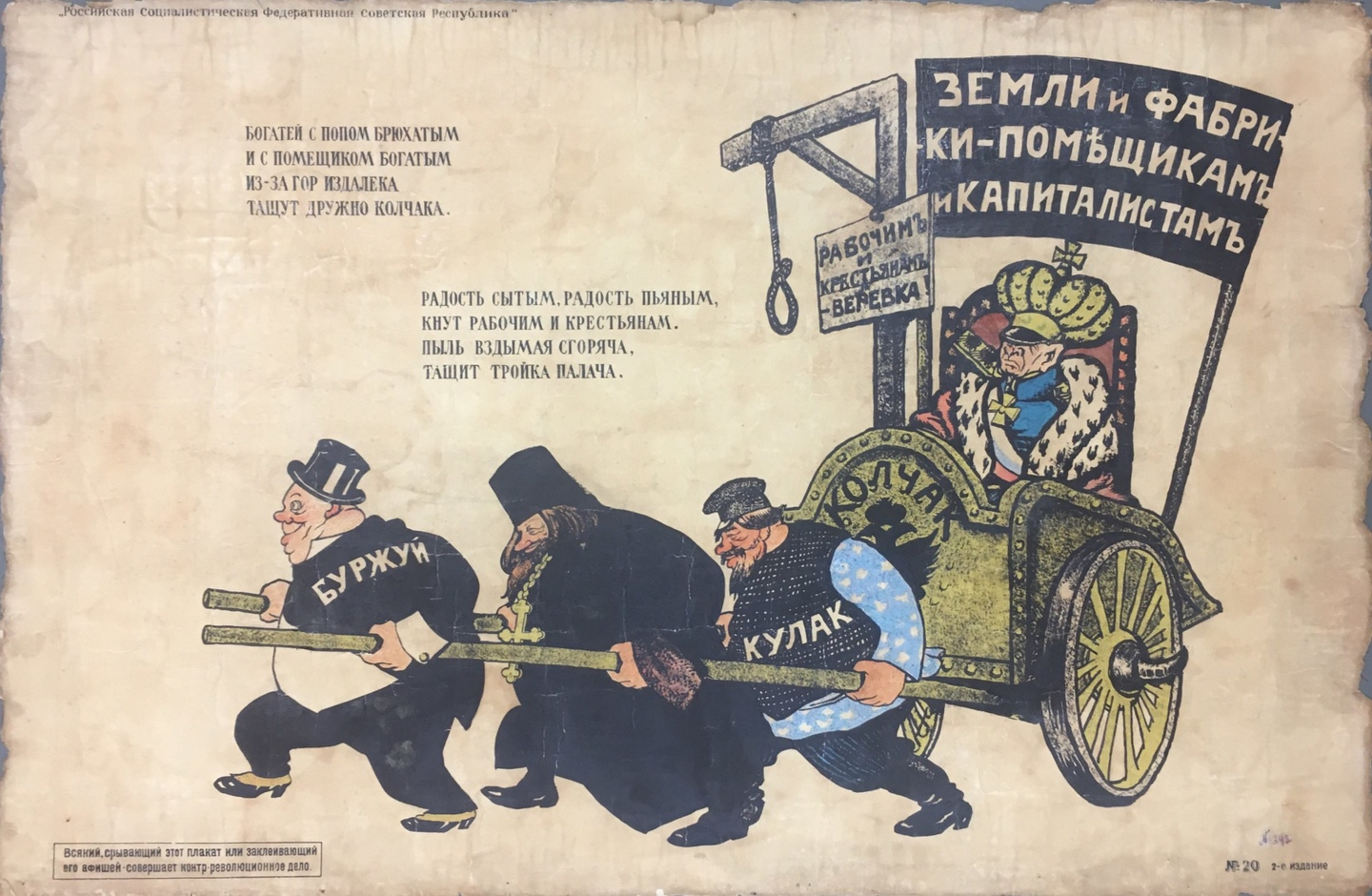
Bolshevik anti-kulak propaganda poster

The Bolshevik government implemented war communism in Ukraine, introducing a strict system of rationing and food requisitioning, which confiscated agricultural produce and livestock from the peasantry, and even forbade them from fishing, hunting or collecting lumber. The attacks against the Ukrainian peasantry were justified under the policy of Dekulakization, despite the fact that, by this point in time, only 0.5% of the peasantry owned more than 10 hectares of land. The sovkhozes also collapsed, with the number of state-owned farms halving and their land area reducing to a third, over the course of 1920. Even the soviet historian Mikhail Kubanin noted that, to most of the Ukrainian peasantry, "the Soviet economy was a new and abhorrent form of rule ... which in reality had merely set the State in the place of the former big landowner."

The implementation of war communism thus resulted in a resurgence of peasant revolts. Insurgents directed their attacks against Bolshevik officials, particularly members of the Cheka and requisitioning units, of whom over 1,000 were killed by the fall of 1920. The Insurgent Army eventually revealed itself with an Address to the Peasants and Workers of Ukraine, in which they announced their intention to carry out violent retribution against the Bolsheviks. The insurgents began to prosecute a campaign of guerrilla warfare against the Red Army throughout left-bank Ukraine, where the Makhnovists knew the land and could carry out a series of surprise attacks against the Bolshevik forces. Towards the end of February, the Estonian Red Riflemen in Huliaipole were eliminated in a surprise attack, after which its commanding officers and political commissars were shot, while its rank-and-file soldiers were given the option to either join the insurgent army or be stripped of their uniforms and sent home. This discriminatory policy was extended throughout the Red Army, with the Insurgents issuing an appeal To the Comrades from the Red Army of the Front and Rearguard, in which they encouraged Red soldiers to mutiny and join the insurgent peasantry in the fight against both the Red and White armies. The 42nd Division and Estonian Division were subsequently ordered to root out these guerrilla elements of the Makhnovshchina. After they reoccupied Huliaipole and seized the insurgents' artillery, their job was considered to be finished, and they were transferred into the reserves and to the Crimean Front respectively.

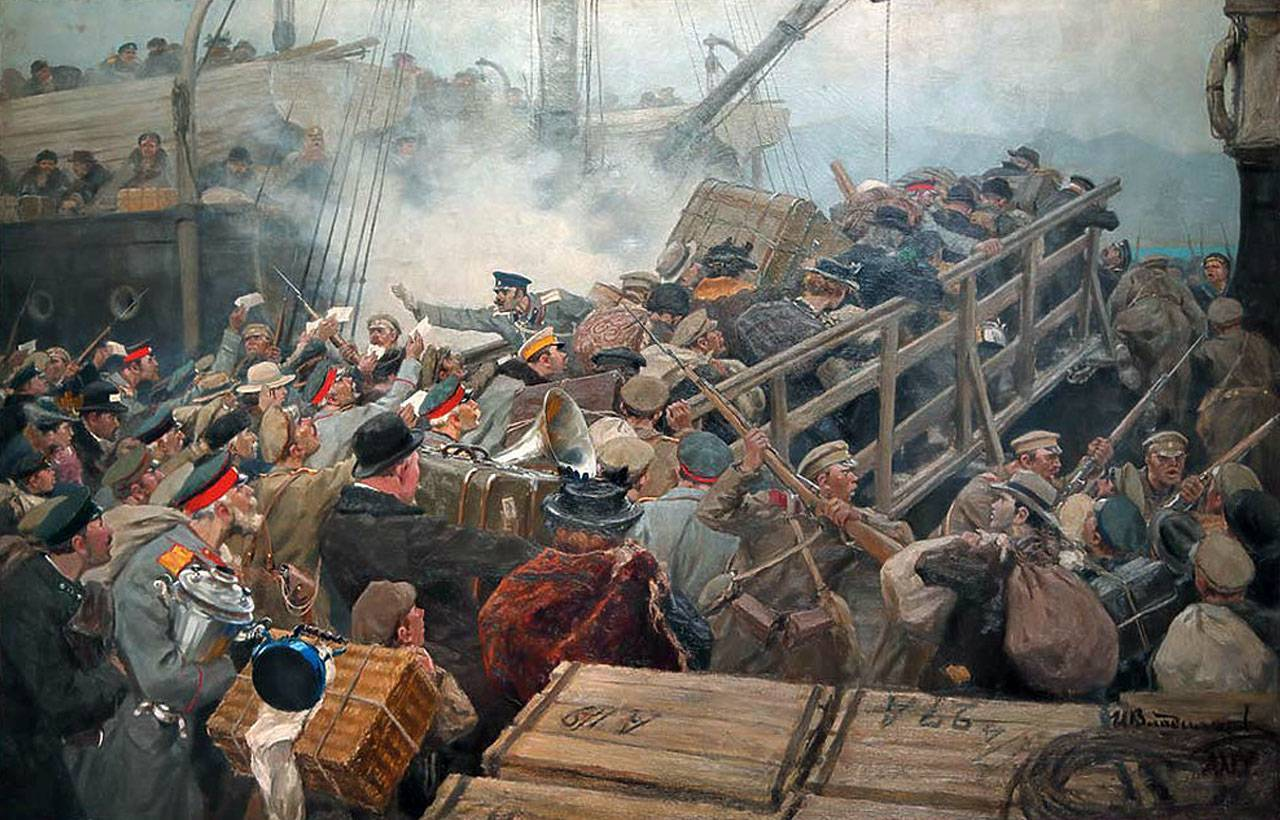
Painting depicting the flight of the bourgeoisie from Novorossiysk in March 1920

In March 1920, the Kuban region was captured by the Red Army, forcing the Armed Forces of South Russia to evacuate to Crimea, where Pyotr Wrangel replaced Anton Denikin as the commander-in-chief of the Russian Army. The Bolsheviks were unable to prevent the evacuation, due in part to their lack of a navy, while their attentions also shifted from the Southern Front to the Western Front, as the Polish advance on Kyiv took precedence over the retreating Whites. Wrangel took the opportunity to reorganise his forces and launch an offensive into northern Tavria, aiming to secure a supply of grain and fresh recruits from the region.

=== Insurgent counteroffensive ===
By this time, the Insurgents had regrouped their forces enough to begin launching larger operations again. Their 4,000-strong force was split into two contingents, each with their own cavalry, infantry, artillery cannons and tachanki. The insurgents set out from Huliaipole on a series of raids against the Red Army positions in northern Ukraine, taking 13,400 soldiers as prisoners of war, rendering a further 30,000 hors de combat and executing 2,000 political commissars and commanding officers. The insurgents also captured a substantial amount of equipment from the Red Army, including 5 artillery cannons, 2,300 artillery shells, 93 machine guns, 2,400,000 cartridges, 3,600 rifles, 25,000 uniforms, a field hospital, and even a ship and an airplane. These raids were complemented by a number of surprise attacks against Red Army units around Huliaipole, during which insurgent cavalry detachments routed the 46th Division, once again bringing the region under insurgent control.

The continuous attacks against Red positions, combined with sustained propaganda efforts and the redistribution of property to the local peasantry, eventually resulted in more partisan detachments joining the Insurgents. The Insurgent Army also issued appeals to the rank-and-file soldiers of the Red Army to cease all attacks against them, identifying the Bolshevik commissars together with the Whites as oppressors of the poor, and urged the Red soldiers to join the insurgents. Within months, the Insurgent Army's ranks increased to 35,000 soldiers, who reestablished the central command of the Military Revolutionary Council, consisting of seven delegates elected by the insurgents themselves, the decisions of which would only be put into effect with the consent of the rank-and-file. On 25 May, the Bolshevik authorities of Katerynoslav province decided to re-focus local efforts on eliminating the resurgent Makhnovshchina, prioritizing anti-insurgent activities over the newly-established Committees of Poor Peasants and the requisitioning of food.

By June, the Insurgent Army were engaged in sustained combat with the 13th Red Army, which forced the Insurgents to retreat to the area around Zaitseve and Domakha, where they intercepted a Red supply train bound for Oleksandrivsk and seized from it a large amount of equipment, including four machine guns. On 8 June, a band of 4,000 insurgents sustained heavy losses after attacking the railway between Pysmenne and Ulyanivka. On 13 June, the remnants of this detachment arrived in Novouspenivka, where they discovered a Red Army unit that was carrying a treasury. The insurgents launched a surprise attack against the Reds and seized their money, but when the insurgents attempted to retreat, they were counterattacked by the Red units, which reduced the insurgent detachment to a few dozen survivors and almost captured Nestor Makhno himself. Following this defeat, Makhno led the insurgents back towards Huliaipole, while the 13th Red Army attempted to encircle them. On 14 June, the Red units sent from Chaplyne were defeated by the insurgents at Velykomykhailivka, resulting in the destruction of half of the Red's artillery battery and the death of 30 Red soldiers. The unit's commander and commissar were subsequently arrested by their own command, due to the detachment's apparent sympathy towards the insurgents. The following day, an even larger battle took place there, resulting in the retreat of the Red units, which put a critical dent in the 13th Red Army's rear and forced some units to be withdrawn from the Taurida front to protect the Red lines of communication between Polohy and Volnovakha.

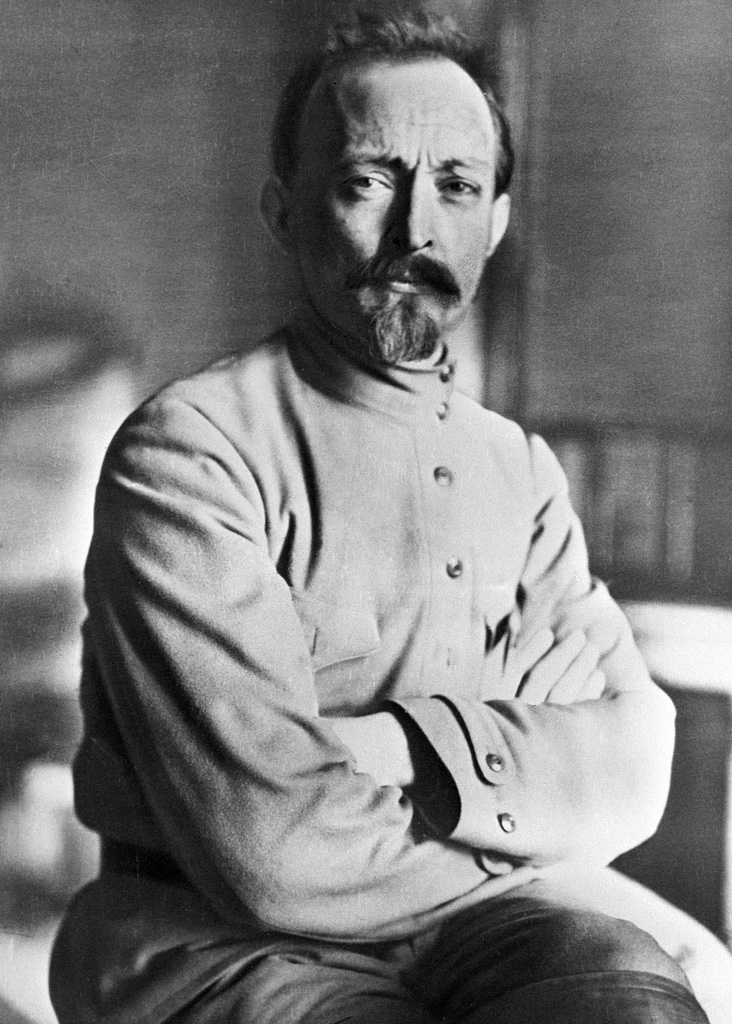
Felix Dzerzhinsky, chairman of the Cheka

On 21 June, the Insurgents attacked Huliaipole, defeating a 300-strong Red infantry detachment and capturing the town. A few days later they surrounded the 522nd Red Regiment and took them prisoner, with many in the regiment defecting to the Insurgent ranks. As Red Army defections increased, the Bolshevik central command once again turned its attention towards the insurgents, with the Cheka's director Felix Dzerzhinsky even arriving in Katerynoslav province to personally direct the anti-Makhnovist campaign. Dzerzhinsky drafted an address to the peasantry of Katerynoslav to try and turn them against the "Makhnovist bandits", alleging links between them and the Ukrainian People's Republic, and calling for the "extermination of the Makhnovists like savage beasts". He also ordered that any village found to have collaborated with the Makhnovists was to be "leveled" and promised that Makhnovist defectors would spared if they chose to "expiate their sin" on the Polish front. The insurgents responded by inviting Red Army soldiers to "think on it", reaffirming their goal of establishing a "free soviet regime" and again encouraging them to defect. It was at this point that the Cheka orchestrated a plot to assassinate Makhno, but the attempt was uncovered before it could be carried out and both of the Cheka's agents were executed.

=== White advance ===
The Insurgents had themselves claimed that their anti-Bolshevik uprising constituted a "Third Revolution", drawing a direct line of succession from the February Revolution and October Revolution, intending to rally together all revolutionary socialists that still supported "free soviets". This drew the attention of Wrangel, who had just defeated Dmitry Zhloba's 30,000-strong Cavalry Corps in Northern Taurida. Wrangel himself had already reorganized the White movement, making concessions to the local Crimean peasantry and attempting to reach out to other anti-Bolshevik forces. On 9 July, one of Wrangel's emissaries met with the Insurgent staff at Vremivka, where he proposed that the Insurgents cooperate with the Whites in their war against the Bolsheviks. Outraged by the proposal, the Insurgents immediately shot the messenger and when a second envoy was sent, they lynched him and hung a sign on his corpse that read "all White emissaries will share this one's fate." Despite the insurgent staff having officially rebuffed Wrangel's overtures, Red, White and foreign newspapers continued to circulate rumours of the alleged alliance, even convincing two former insurgent lieutenants to join the Russian Army as a partisan detachment baring Makhno's name. The Makhnovists responded by issuing a categorically anti-Wrangel declaration, in which they reiterated their history of fighting against counterrevolutionaries and appealed to White soldiers to defect to the insurgent banner.

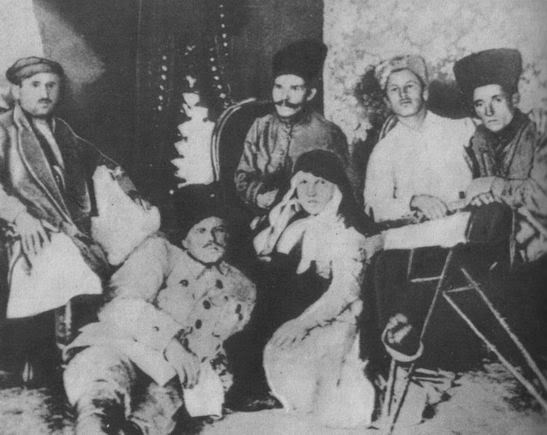
Insurgent lieutenants at a hospital in Starobilsk

While the Reds and Whites engaged each other at Orikhiv, the Insurgent Army launched a series of raids into Poltava. In the first week of August, they were joined by a 500-strong independent anarchist detachment at Liutenka, while under pursuit by Red Army units. On 16 August, attacked Myrhorod, where they destroyed local Bolshevik office buildings, killed 21 Red soldiers and looted the regional food committee. They then moved on to Kobeliaky, where they derailed a Red armoured train, and on 24 August, their detachment of 3,000 infantry and 700 cavalry arrived in Hubynykha. The following day, the insurgents were attacked by the 115th Red Cavalry Regiment and forced to retreat, first to Izium and then to Starobilsk, where they seized 4 machine guns, 40,000 cartridges and 180 horses, before freeing 1,000 Red prisoners of war.

In September, the Red Army captured Huliaipole from the Whites, establishing it as the headquarters of the 42nd Division. By this time, the Makhnovist core consisted of about 2,000 soldiers, but could count on over 20,000 reserves from sympathetic villages. Throughout September, the Insurgents posed the greatest threat to the Bolshevik authorities in Katerynoslav province, with Sergey Kamenev demanding the liquidation of the Insurgent Army. But by October, a renewed White offensive had seen the occupation of Oleksandrivsk and had pushed as far as the gates of Katerynoslav, which shifted the priorities of both the Red Army and the Insurgent Army. The Red command came to believe that if they could first defeat the Whites and establish the Ukrainian Soviet Socialist Republic as the sole regime in Ukraine, then the elimination of the Makhnovshchina would quickly follow.

On 27 September, Mikhail Frunze arrived in Kharkiv, where he took command of the Northern Taurida Operation. While the 30,000-strong Red Army outnumbered the 25,000-strong White Army, the Whites had more than twice the cavalry of the Reds, which gave them greater mobility on the steppe. It was Makhno's 12,000-strong force that had the cavalry numbers to overwhelm the Whites, which pressured the Bolshevik command to open negotiations with the Makhnovists.

== Truce (October–November 1920) ==
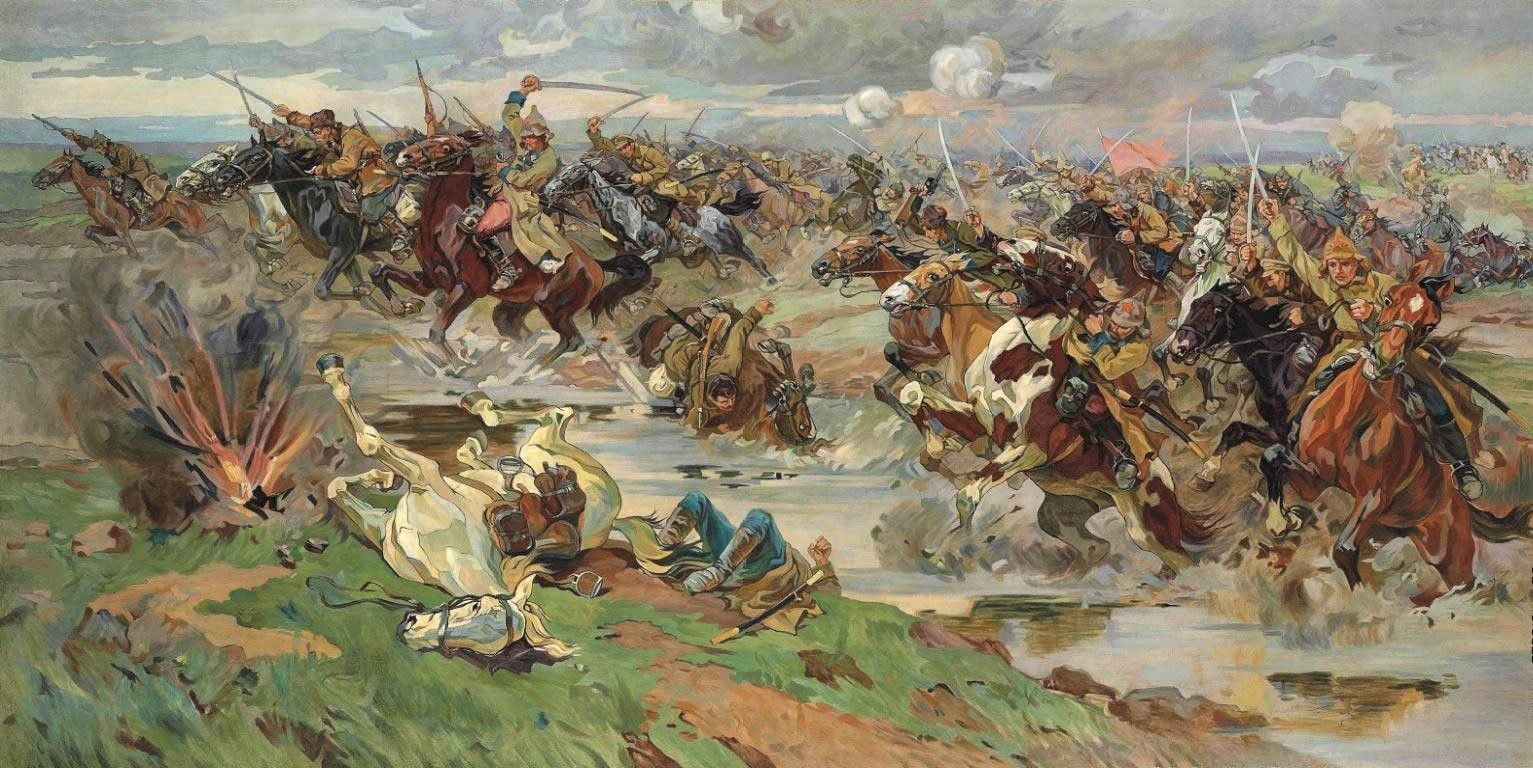
Painting depicting the Soviet cavalry charge during the Siege of Perekop

On 30 September 1920, a truce was brokered between the Red Army and the Insurgent Army. Negotiators from both factions drafted the terms of a political-military agreement, which would extend civil liberties to Ukrainian anarchists in return for the military subordination of the Insurgent Army to the Bolshevik high command. Together, the united front of the anarchists and the Bolsheviks was able to defeat the White offensive and force them back to Crimea, where the Whites coordinated their evacuation, bringing an end to the Southern Front of the Russian Civil War.

== Second phase (November 1920 – August 1921) ==
One of the Bolshevik signatories to the pact, Sergey Gusev, himself claimed that the military alliance with the Makhnovists had not made for the sake of insurgent aid in the war against Wrangel, "but in order to rid ourselves for a time of an enemy behind our lines", stating that the agreement would always have "quite naturally broken" following Wrangel's defeat. The other Bolshevik signatory was Yakov Yakovlev, who denounced the Ukrainian anarchists at the first congress of the Red International of Labor Unions, blaming the breakdown of the alliance on the Makhnovists, who he labelled as "bandits". Despite the Bolshevik displays of Realpolitik, the Makhnovists hoped that the pact would continue to hold for another few months, which would allow them time to build a libertarian alternative to the Ukrainian Soviet government. The Makhnovist delegation to the anarchist congress in Kharkiv, led by Dmitry Popov, bluntly declared the restoration of the free soviets and the autonomy of the Makhnovschina, calling on the Bolsheviks to fully implement the terms of the political pact. Other Makhnovists were not so optimistic, with the chief-of-staff Hryhory Vasylivsky even declaring the end of the agreement and calling for the insurgents to prepare for a Bolshevik attack within the week.

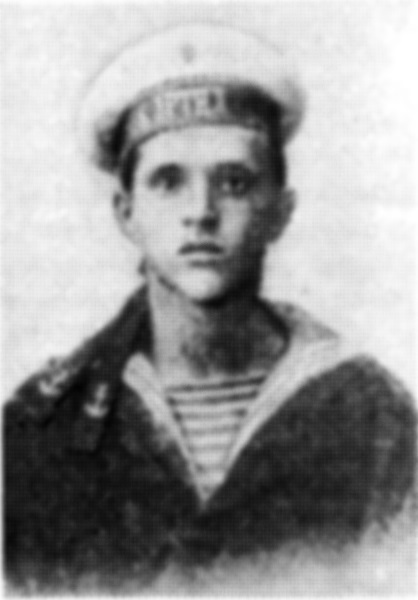
Dmitry Popov, a member of the Makhnovist delegation to the Ukrainian soviet government in Kharkiv, who was assassinated by the Cheka on 26 November 1920

On 14 November, the Bolshevik plans to liquidate the Makhnovshchina were finalised by the All-Ukrainian Central Executive Committee, with the approval of both Vladimir Lenin and Leon Trotsky. The insurgents began reporting to their high command that Makhnovist supporters were being harassed and arrested on charges of banditry, as Mikhail Frunze began issuing orders to sweep Ukraine of all "bandits". On 17 November, Frunze issued Order 00106, which integrated the Insurgent Army into the 4th Army and transferred it to the Caucasian Front, although the order was never actually sent to insurgent command. The following week, on 23 November, Frunze issued Order 00149 directly to Makhno, instructing the Insurgent Army to dissolve itself. He then issued Order 00155 to his own troops, instructing them to prepare to liquidate the Makhnovshchina within 48 hours. Copies of these orders, in which Frunze declared the Makhnovists to be outlaws and ordered the concentration of Red Army forces in the Makhnovist region, were not sent to Huliaipole or the delegation in Kharkiv. Vladimir Lenin also directly ordered Rakovsky to covertly initiate the criminalisation of the Ukrainian anarchist movement and to begin preparing charges against them. That same day, spies from the 42nd Rifle Division were discovered attempting to locate the exact whereabouts of the insurgent command, with the purpose of aiding a Red Army offensive against the Makhnovshchina. The delegation in Kharkiv responded by pressing Christian Rakovsky to arrest the 42nd Division's commanding officers and prevent any Red Army incursion into insurgent-held territory, but the Soviet government claimed it had all been a misunderstanding and promised to investigate it.

=== Surprise attack ===
On 26 November, when the Makhnovist delegation inquired about the status of the investigation, they were arrested and sent to Moscow, where they were shot. In total, 346 of the anarchists in Kharkiv were arrested, with a number of prominent Makhnovists being charged with treason and shot by the Moscow Cheka, and almost the entire membership of the Nabat being imprisoned. Coordinated mass arrests of anarchists were also carried in the other major cities of southern Ukraine, including Yelysavethrad. The 42nd Division simultaneously led an attack against Huliaipole, while the 2nd Cavalry Corps surrounded the town. Makhno's 150-strong Black Guard detachment quickly rallied the towns defense, but decided to make their escape after spotting a break in the Red lines. After the 3rd Makhnovist Regiment was captured by the 126th Division at Malaya Tokmacha, Makhno's forces led a counterattack that pushed the Red forces back to Novouspenivka, taking the opportunity to regroup the insurgent forces, with some Red soldiers even defecting to his ranks. With 1,500 infantry and 1,000 cavalry at their disposal, the insurgents retook Huliaipole from the 42nd Division after hours of fighting, capturing 6,000 Red soldiers in the town, 2,000 of whom also joined the Makhnovist ranks. Among the captured soldiers, the Makhnovists found that they had been given orders to attack the Makhnovists as early as 16 November, a day before the Crimean campaign had even reached its conclusion. Despite the victory, the Makhnovists were forced to abandon Huliaipole and retreat.

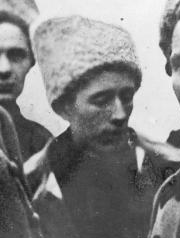
Semen Karetnyk, the leader of the Makhnovist offensive in Crimea, who was assassinated by the Red Army on 26 November 1920

That same night, the Makhnovist commanders in Crimea were summoned to a joint planning conference with the Red Army command, but were ambushed en route and shot, with both Semen Karetnyk and Petro Havrylenko being killed. The following night, their contingent was encircled in a surprise attack by the Cheka and mown down by hundreds of machine guns, wiping out large numbers of insurgents. Part of the detachment was able to escape to Perekop, managing to defeat the 7th Cavalry Division along the way, while being pursued by the 3rd Cavalry Corps and the 52nd Rifle Division. When they reached their destination, they split into two groups, with one crossing the Syvash while the other faced the 1st Rifle Division at the Isthmus. They rejoined each other the following day at Strohanivka, having safely escaped Crimea. Red commanders noted that their "own units displayed no initiative" in attacking the Makhnovists, often not acting without specific orders and only reluctantly engaging. In response, 2,300 Red soldiers were ordered to be shot by their high command, charged with having "undermined the just endeavors of the soviet authorities and of their valiant Red Army." The Red Army command also justified the attacks against the Makhnovists based on claims that they had refused orders and intended to betray them, despite themselves having reportedly planned to break the alliance with the Makhnovists since before the offensive against Wrangel had even begun.

Red troops in mainland Ukraine, who had not themselves participated in the siege of Perekop, were ordered to pursue Karetnyk's detachment and prevent them from regrouping with the other insurgents at Huliaipole. They were caught and encircled at Mykhailivka by the Red Junker Division, 42nd Rifle Division, International Cavalry Brigade and 4th Cavalry Division, under the command of Semyon Timoshenko. Short on ammunition and outnumbered 20-to-1, the insurgent detachment only had 1,000 cavalry, 300 tachanki, 250 machine guns and 6 artillery cannons with which to face the Red divisions. They were able to evade the first encounter but fell into an engagement with the Red Divisions at Timoshivka, capturing the city after a day of fighting and heavy casualties, allowing them to restock ammunition for the first time since their capture of Simferopol. Rather than moving on immediately, the detachment remained in the town, which allowed the Red forces to regroup and attack, eventually forcing the insurgents to retreat back to Mykhailivka after running through their ammunition. Once again, they were pinned down by the Red cavalry and artillery, resulting in the deaths of 600 insurgents and the rest of the detachment breaking up into small groups and attempting to escape. 200 insurgents were immediately intercepted and killed by the sabres of the International Cavalry Brigade, with less than 300 insurgent cavalry managing to escape to Kermenchyk, where they finally linked up with Makhno's forces on 7 December. The contingent's commanders announced "the return of the Crimean army", now only 1/5th of its original size, and told the story of Karetnik's assassination at a general assembly of the remaining insurgent forces.

=== Encirclement attempts ===
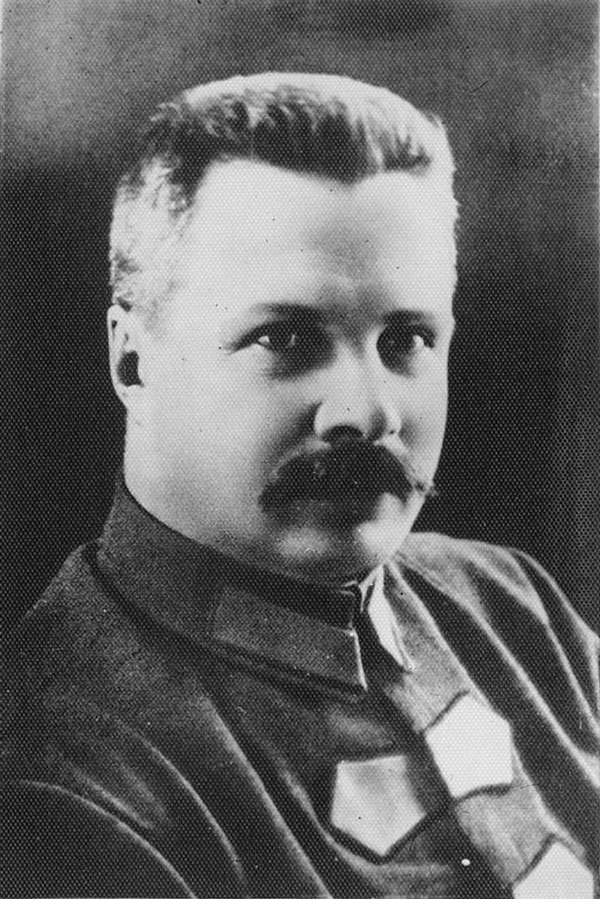
Mikhail Frunze, commander of anti-Makhnovist operations in late 1920, during which he oversaw attempts to encircle the Makhnovshchina

With the surprise attack having failed to eliminate the Makhnovshchina, Mikhail Frunze deployed almost the entire Southern Front of the Red Army against the Makhnovists, aiming to encircle them. The Red Army mustered together 150,000 soldiers to fight against the insurgents, rallying the 4th, 6th and 13th Armies, along with the 1st and 2nd Cavalry Armies. With the Revolutionary Military Council putting pressure on Frunze and Kamenev to liquidate the insurgent movement, they ordered continual sweeps through insurgent-held territory over the subsequent weeks, planning to push them down towards the Sea of Azov, where they would be "ruthlessly exterminate[d]".

But the Makhnovists continued to remain an ephemeral target, launching waves of surprise attacks against Red units and seizing their equipment, before breaking out of their encirclement with relative ease. One Red officer acknowledged that this guerrilla warfare was made possible by the Makhnovists' popular support, which came from the local peasantry, mine workers, war widows and orphans, and even some former Communist Party members and Red Army soldiers. Frunze responded with an order that the local population be completely disarmed, dispatching Internal Affairs commissar Vladimir Antonov-Saratovsky to the Makhnovist region, in order to solidify Bolshevik power and break civilian support for the Makhnovshchina. The Makhnovist movement was also aided by numerous desertions from the Red Army, which became such a systemic problem that the Bolshevik command ordered all Makhnovist prisoners be executed, in order to discourage potential sympathisers. By the time the Crimean army reunited with the Makhnovist core, the insurgents had already seen a number of victories at Komar. At the head of a 600-strong detachment, the Makhnovist commander Mykhailo Brova defeated a Russian hussar brigade, and the following day, Makhno himself commanded a 4,000-strong insurgent detachment in routing a Red Kirghiz brigade.

Pursued by the Red Army, which was under orders to annihilate the Makhnovshchina before Christmas, the insurgent core subsequently made for Novospasivka, where they joined up with Vdovychenko's insurgent detachment, before finally moving on to Berdiansk. There, on 12 December, the Makhnovists encountered a small and ill-equipped Red garrison, many of whom went over to the insurgent side. The Makhnovist raid on Berdiansk resulted in the deaths of about 83 Reds, before the insurgents moved on to Andriivka. Following a short rest at local farmhouses, the insurgents found themselves under assault by units of the 4th Army, which were approaching from the north-west. Surrounded by a much larger Red force, the insurgents managed to go on the offensive, breaking out to the north and escaping with their entire cavalry and almost all of their infantry after a day of constant fighting, in a battle that became known as the "Andriyivsky konfuz". In the process, the insurgents had managed to capture some 20,000 Red soldiers, who were subsequently given the option to either return home or join the insurgent ranks.

Ignorant of the insurgents' exact whereabouts, Frunze again attempted to encircle them, ordering the 2nd Don Division to sweep the area south of the railway between Oleksandrivsk and Volnovakha, while the cavalry detachment under Roberts Eidemanis was ordered to prevent the insurgents from breaking out of the encirclement. Frunze also put together three 2,000-strong detachments, reinforced by the 2nd Cavalry Army, to pursue the insurgents, with the intention of wiping them out. Some Red units that had joined the insurgents at Andriivka re-defected and informed their commanders of the insurgent positions. On 16 December, the insurgents were surrounded at Fedorivka. For 14 hours, the insurgents fought against the 2nd Cavalry Army and Eidemanis' forces. The battle was apparently confused, with documented cases of friendly fire by Red units, as both sides were wearing the same uniform. The engagement eventually resulted in a stalemate and the insurgents abandoned many of their black standards in the battlefield, along with most of their equipment, including all of their artillery cannons. In a telegram to Lenin, Frunze reported devastating losses on the Makhnovist side, with only a small detachment of cavalry escaping.

=== Retreat and pursuit ===
On 19 December, the insurgents were again encircled by a large Red force at Kostyantin, but managed to escape. By this time, the insurgents were down to only 3,000 soldiers and often faced Red forces between 3 and 5 times their size. The insurgents responded by splitting up into several small detachments and scattering throughout Ukraine, abandoning their heavy weapons in order to stay mobile on the open steppe. Some insurgent detachments even made it as far as Kyiv, attacking members of the Cheka, requisitioning units and Communist Party officials. Alexander Parkhomenko was among the prominent Ukrainian Bolsheviks that were killed in a surprise attack by the insurgents. Makhno himself led a detachment towards Yuzivka, but was turned back by a larger enemy force and retreated to Yelysavethrad, taking care to avoid the roads in order to make their pursuit more difficult.

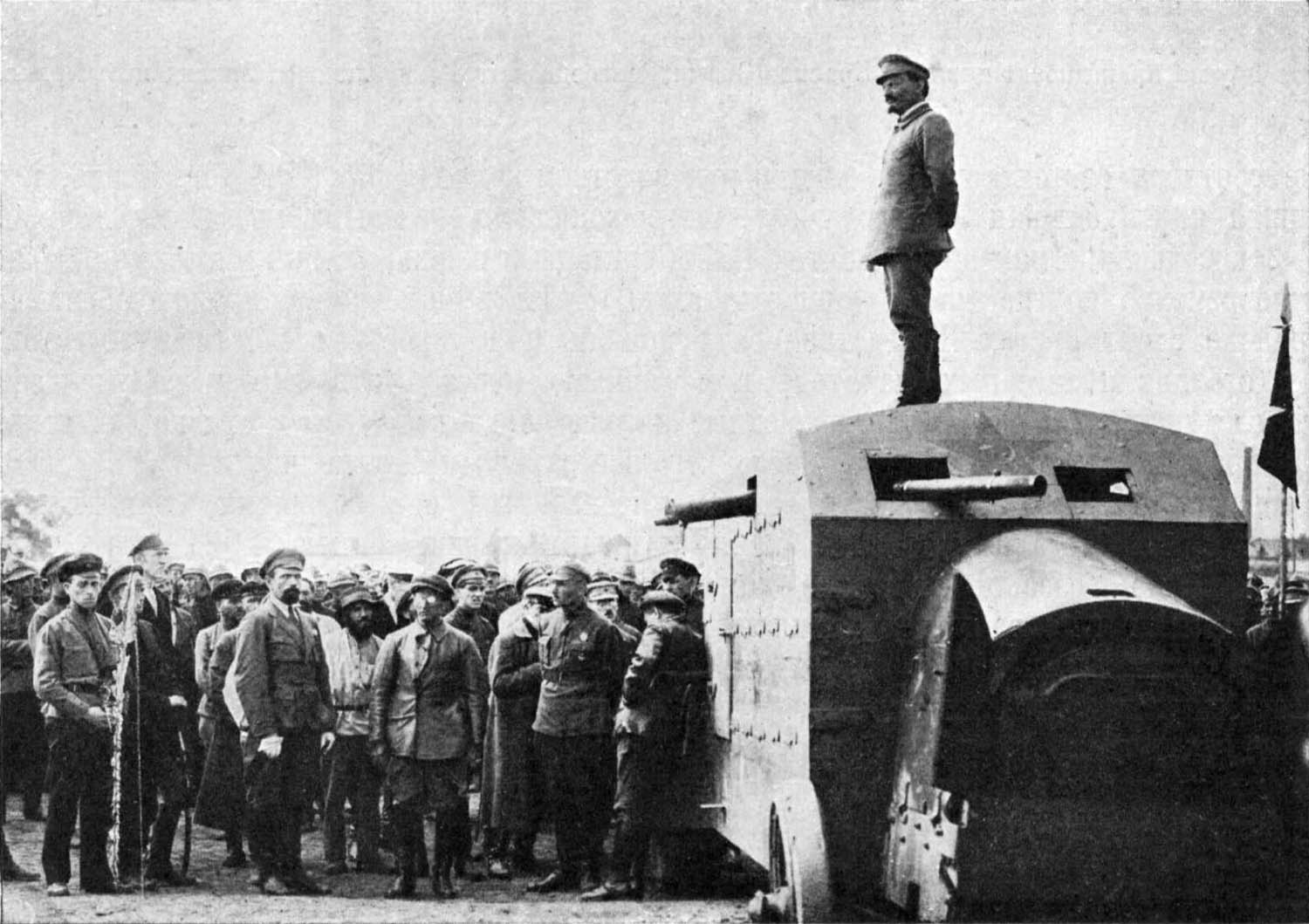
Trotsky in Crimea, 1921

Vladimir Nesterovich was put in command of a "flying corps", composed of the Red Army's best units in Ukraine, that was charged with pursuing the insurgents throughout the country, aided by the Red Cossacks under Vitaly Primakov and Grigory Kotovsky. Makhno's detachment found itself surrounded, only able to advance slowly under heavy machine-gun fire and artillery bombardment. According to Peter Arshinov, none of the insurgents there wanted to disperse, as they were "all determined to die together, side by side." The Makhnovists managed to approach the border with Galicia, before swinging around and heading back across the Dnieper, eventually ending up in Poltava. From there they went north towards Belgorod, where they managed to shake off the pursuing Cossacks by the end of January. At this point they had travelled more than 1,500 kilometers, lost most of their equipment and half of their detachment, but were now in a position to go on the offensive. In February, Makhno's detachment went on to province of Kharkiv and then Kursk, where they captured Korocha, before resolving to return to their home region via the Don, pursued the whole way by the 2nd Cavalry Army. Meanwhile, back in southern Ukraine, the encircled local insurgents were already carrying out reprisals against the Cheka, requisitioning units and other government functionaries.

The Ukrainian Soviet government were increasingly worried by the persistence of the Makhnovist movement, with Eidemanis publishing several papers on how he thought the insurgency could be overcome, through both military and political means. Lenin himself blamed the continuation of the insurgent movement on Mikhail Frunze, who he rebuked at the 10th Bolshevik Party Congress and again demanded the immediate liquidation of the Makhnovists. Semyon Budyonny reported that he faced great difficulty maintaining discipline within his own ranks, having at one point shot a number of brigade and regimental commanders after they had been defeated by the insurgents, declaring that: "none of the commanders had any inclination to complete the task of wiping out Makhno, regardless of cost and with all possible speed." Furthermore, soldiers continued to desert the Red Army in order to join the insurgents. One notable case happened on 9 February, when Grigori Maslakov led his entire brigade in defecting from the 4th Cavalry Division to the Insurgent Army, in which he came to command insurgent operations in the Don and Kuban regions.

This was all happening at a time when anti-Bolshevik uprisings were sweeping through the country, with rebellions breaking out in Tambov, Siberia, Karelia and even Kronstadt. In Ukraine alone, an estimated 50,000 people were in open revolt against the government. The Makhnovists themselves maintained a core group of 2,000 infantry, 600 cavalry, 80 machine guns and 10 artillery cannons, with the ability to field 10,000 more for large scale operations. The Soviet government responded by introducing the New Economic Policy (NEP), which brought an end to the policy of "war communism". The cessation of food requisitioning removed the main grievance that the peasants had against the Bolsheviks, effectively severing the Makhnovshchina from their war-weary peasant base. The Makhnovist's peasant base, which they had relied on for supplies and logistics, started to melt away.

=== Reorganization ===
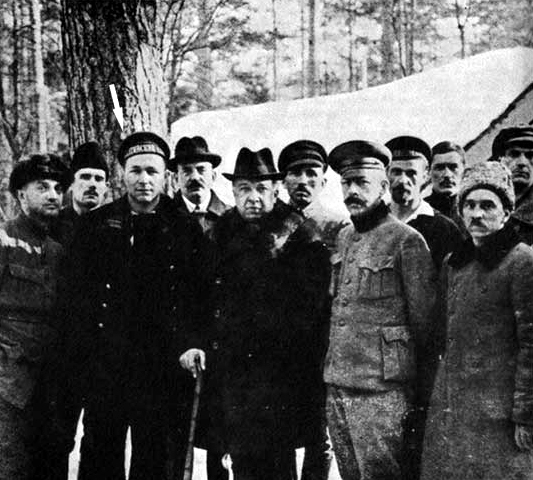
Stepan Petrichenko and other partisans of the Kronstadt rebellion

The Insurgent Army reorganized itself once again, relying on their tested tactics of lightning warfare and decentralization to continue prosecuting the conflict. In response to the outbreak of the Kronstadt rebellion in March 1921, Mykhailo Brova's detachment was dispatched to the Don and Kuban regions, while others were sent to Voronezh and Kharkiv, all in order to foment the further spread of the insurrection. Makhno's detachment stuck to the banks of the Dnieper, eventually splitting up in order to cover more ground, in the face of continued Red Army assaults and ambushes. After attempting to link up with insurgents near Huliaipole, a fierce engagement with Red forces at Melitopol forced Makhno's wounded detachment to retreat to Tokmak, then to Komar. Petro Petrenko led the defense against further Red assaults, but after a botched insurgent counter-offensive resulted in Makhno being seriously wounded, on 15 March, the insurgents split up into independent sotnias of 100–200 men. Makhno's own detachment was forced by the 9th Red Cavalry Division into a long 120 mile retreat to Novospasivka. Here they ran into more Red cavalry and subsequently fled to Starodubivka, where five machine gunners sacrificed themselves in order to cover for the wounded Makhno's escape. On 17 March, following a skirmish at Pokrovske, Makhno's remaining detachment fled on to Hryshyne, where they reestablished contact with Fedir Shchus' detachment after a few days of separation. The insurgents began to regroup their forces once again, setting a rendezvous in Kobeliaky for the beginning of May.

In response to the rebound of the Makhnovshchina, the Fifth All-Ukrainian Congress of Soviets had called for a formal campaign against "banditry" and offered amnesty to those charged with banditry if they turned themselves in before 15 April. Thousands of insurgents gave themselves up, including a number of leading Makhnovists, such as the former artillery commander Vasyl Sharovsky. Despite the intensification of the Red Army offensive, the Insurgent Army continued prosecuting its war into the spring of 1921. The Red Cavalry had found itself largely ineffective against the Makhnovist core and were thus transferred to Crimea, in order to put down Brova's insurrection. When Semyon Budyonny's own cavalry detachment fell into an encounter with Makhno's, the Red Cossacks were forced to flee in the face of the superior insurgent numbers, with the defeat even catalyzing a number of desertions from the 1st Cavalry Army.

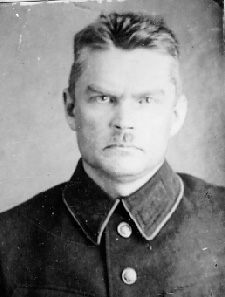
Roberts Eidemanis, who took over anti-Makhnovist operations in the summer of 1921

In May, the Makhnovists mounted an offensive against the Ukrainian Bolshevik capital of Kharkiv, regrouping thousands of insurgent partisans, including 2,000 cavalry. The Bolsheviks responded by surrounding the city with Red Army infantry, tanks, machine guns and artillery cannons, which frustrated the insurgent army's attempted assault, forcing them to abandon the offensive and again revert to decentralized detachments. Over the course of June 1921, the Makhnovists suffered heavy losses, particularly during their defeat in Poltava. The Red Army also suffered heavy losses, but were able to more effectively replenish those losses due to their much larger reserves. On 26 June, when Mikhail Frunze himself was ambushed and wounded by insurgents, the Red Army central command took the opportunity to finally relieve him from command, replacing him with the former Tsarist officer Konstantin Avksentevsky. Under Avksentevsky's command, the Red Army offensive against the Makhnovists was stepped up, with prominent Bolsheviks such as Roberts Eidemanis, Vasily Blyukher and Nikita Khrushchev taking charge of on-the-ground operations. With this change in leadership, the Red Army finally adopted new tactics. Following Eidemanis' suggestions, instead of pursuing the insurgents, the Reds established a series of garrisons along the predicted lines of the Makhnovist raids.

=== Defeat ===
By the summer of 1921, the Makhnovshchina had effectively been defeated, both militarily and politically, with Red Army garrisons everywhere and their peasant base exhausted by the long war. The season brought with it a drought, which forced the insurgent core out of Ukraine on a series of raids around Southern Russia, before returning to Ukraine through the Don. This repeated crossing of the Bolshevik lines showed a weakness in Eidemanis' tactics, with the Bolshevik command resolving to combine it with Frunze's previous tactics of pursuit, which would together cut down on the Makhnovist capability to escape. Although it had finally gained the upper hand with the defeat of the numerous other rebellions around Russia, the Red Army still found itself unable to fully tame the insurrection in Ukraine. In July 1921, there were still 18 insurgent bands, with 1,042 men and 19 machine guns, operating in Donetsk alone. The Red Army command resolved to focus its energies entirely on wiping out the Makhnovist core by fielding a motorized detachment, commanded by Marcian Germanovich, to pursue Makhno's 200-strong sotnia. On 12 July, the motorized detachment disembarked from its armored train at Tsarekonstantinovka but one of its armored cars was immediately ambushed by the Makhnovists, who captured the crew and ran the car out of fuel. The subsequent pursuit of the Makhnovists lasted five days and covered 520 kilometers, causing the insurgents heavy losses and almost running them out of ammo, before they were finally able to shake the armored detachment off their trail. With Makhno having again slipped away from the Red Army, on 22 July, Eidemanis ordered the execution of a number of Makhnovist reserves, while Frunze again demanded the "definitive liquidation" of the Makhnovist movement.

By August, the insurgent army had almost been completely eliminated. Some insurgent commanders like Vasyl Kurylenko had already been killed and others like Fedir Shchus and Foma Kozhyn were gravely wounded, while Makhno himself was hiding out in Donetsk. On 4 August, Frunze held a press conference in which he confidently declared victory over the insurrection, reporting that only a few small insurgent bands were left to wipe out. A wounded Makhno finally accepted defeat and decided to flee into exile, in order to receive medical attention.

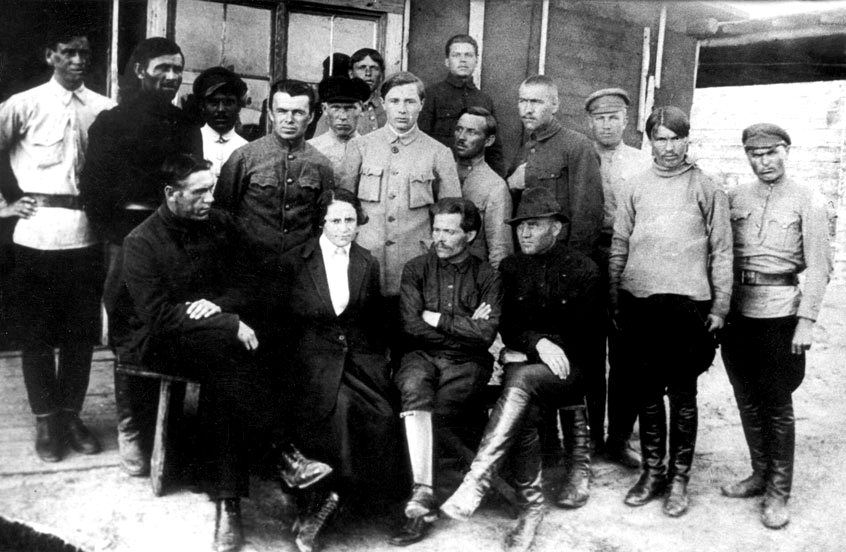
Nestor Makhno and other Makhnovist exiles, in a Polish concentration camp

Leaving Viktor Bilash in command of the insurgent core in Ukraine, Makhno set off on 13 August, taking with him his wife and his black sotnia — consisting of 100 cavalry. On 16 August, they crossed the Dnieper, under constant pursuit by the Red cavalry, which wounded Makhno even further. On 19 August, they encountered the 7th Cavalry Division at Bobrynets. Unable to retreat, the insurgents attacked the division and captured their machine guns, before continuing again on their journary, having lost 17 of their own men. On 22 August, Makhno was shot in the neck, causing a scar where the bullet exited through his right cheek. On 26 August, they fought a final battle with the Red Cavalry, during which the last of his old comrades, including Petro Petrenko, were killed. After one of the insurgent scouts was captured on his way to the Polish border, the detachment changed direction and headed for the Dniester. On 28 August, the insurgents disguised themselves as Red Army soldiers and accosted the Soviet border guards, disarming them before fording the river under heavy fire. Finally in Romania, they were themselves disarmed by the Romanian border guards and taken to an internment camp. In exile, many of the Makhnovists found themselves drifting between a series of concentration camps and prisons. Leading figures of the Makhnovist movement, such as Volin, Peter Arshinov and Nestor Makhno himself, eventually ended up in Paris, where their exile lasted up until their deaths.

Meanwhile, Bilash had found himself unable to sustain the guerrilla war, with his detachment almost being wiped out in an ambush at Znamianka. Some of the survivors managed to flee across the border, but Bilash himself was arrested by the Cheka and transferred to Kharkiv, where he wrote his memoirs before his trial and execution. During the autumn of 1921, 30 Makhnovist commanders and 2,443 insurgents surrendered to the Soviet government, some of whom even asked for official recognition of their role in fighting the White movement. Despite the defeat, the Makhnovist insurrection continued on underground throughout the 1920s: in 1922, a Makhnovist band was eliminated in Poltava; in 1923, a clandestine Makhnovist organization was dismantled; in 1924, there were reported to still be 18 insurgent bands operating in Ukraine. Makhnovist activity even persisted up until the outbreak of World War II, when Makhnovist veterans rose up against the Nazi occupation of Ukraine.

== Bibliography ==
- Avrich, Paul (1971) [1967]. The Russian Anarchists. Princeton: Princeton University Press. ISBN 0-691-00766-7. OCLC 1154930946.
- Darch, Colin (2020). Nestor Makhno and Rural Anarchism in Ukraine, 1917–1921. London: Pluto Press. ISBN 978-1786805263. OCLC 1225942343.
- Footman, David (1961). "Makhno". Civil War in Russia. Praeger Publications in Russian History and World Communism. Vol. 114. New York: Praeger. pp. 245–302. LCCN 62-17560. OCLC 254495418.
- Malet, Michael (1982). Nestor Makhno in the Russian Civil War. London: Palgrave Macmillan. ISBN 978-0-333-25969-6. OCLC 8514426.
- Peters, Victor (1970). Nestor Makhno: The Life of an Anarchist. Winnipeg: Echo Books. OCLC 7925080.
- Shubin, Aleksandr (2010). "The Makhnovist Movement and the National Question in the Ukraine, 1917–1921". In Hirsch, Steven J.; van der Walt, Lucien (eds.). Anarchism and Syndicalism in the Colonial and Postcolonial World, 1870–1940. Studies in Global Social History. Vol. 6. Leiden: Brill. pp. 147–191. ISBN 978-9004188495. OCLC 868808983.
- Skirda, Alexandre (2004) [1982]. Nestor Makhno–Anarchy's Cossack: The Struggle for Free Soviets in the Ukraine 1917–1921. Translated by Sharkey, Paul. Oakland: AK Press. ISBN 978-1-902593-68-5. OCLC 60602979.
