= 1st Donetsk Corps =

Military unit

- 1-й Донецкий корпус
- Active: 1 September 1919–11 January 1920
- Country: Ukraine
- Allegiance: Makhnovshchina
- Branch: Revolutionary Insurgent Army of Ukraine
- Type: Partisan corps
- Size: 15,000
- Garrison/HQ: Donetsk
- Equipment: 15,500 bayonets, 3,650 sabers, 144 machine guns, 16 cannons.
- Engagements: Ukrainian War of Independence: Battle of Peregonovka; Raid of the 1st Donetsk Corps; Battle of Elisavetograd; Defense of Yekaterinoslav

Commanders
- 1st Donetsk Corps: Timofey Lashkevich
- 1st Brigade: Alexander Kalashnikov
- 2nd Brigade: Trofim Yakovlevich Vdovichenko
- 3rd Brigade: Petro Havrylenko
- 4th Brigade: Mikhail Uralov
- 1st Cavalry Brigade: Fedir Shchus
- Counterintelligence: Lev Zadov

The 1st Donetsk Corps was a military formation of the Revolutionary Insurgent Army of Ukraine, it was created on 1 September 1919 and existed until 1920.

== History ==
On 1 September 1919, a meeting of insurgents was held in Dobrovelychkivka, at which a delegate was elected from each regiment. The meeting discussed the question of the further political existence of the Makhnovshchina as an independent organism. They also discussed the issue of reorganizing the rebel regiments into a single army that would be effective in guerrilla warfare. The meeting elected a Military Revolutionary Council, as the central command of the insurgents. The insurgent regiments led by Nestor Makhno were officially named the Revolutionary Insurgent Army of Ukraine (RIAU). Viktor Belash was in charge of organizing the army. Belash developed the structure of the RIAU, which consisted of four corps (three active and one reserve), each built from a number of divisions, which were in turn divided into regiments, battalions, companies and platoons. Kalashnikov was appointed at the head of the 1st Donetsk corps.

On 27 September 1919, the 1st corps took part in the Battle of Peregonovka, in which the RIAU won a major victory. On 28 September 1919, Makhno decided to conduct a deep raid on the Yekaterinoslav, in which the 1st corps also took part. The Insurgent Army set off on a march in three main columns for the raid. The infantry in carts and cavalry made daily marches of 80-90 versts. The left column, consisting of infantry regiments of the 1st corps, moved 320 miles along the route from Novoarkhanhelsk, to Elisavetgrad, Adjamka and Kamenka, before they arrived at Yekaterinoslav. Units of the 1st corps did not delay in storming the city and changed their route. As a result, Kalashnikov's column occupied Krivoy Rog (this was part of the task of the 2nd corps), and his attack on Yekaterinoslav did not take place.

On 11 January 1920, at a meeting of commanders in Gulyaypole, it was decided to immediately disband the 1st corps to their homes. In the spring of 1920, an insurgent detachment headed by Nestor Makhno was created from the soldiers of the former 1st corps.

== Composition ==
- 1st brigade: brigade commander Kalashnikov, chief of staff Serebryansky, adjutant Mischuk. Assigned 9 guns: 6 three-inch guns, 2 English three-inch guns, 1 mountain gun.
  - 1st Ekaterinoslavsky regiment, Dnipro
  - 3rd Crimean regiment: regiment commander Plaksim,
  - 13th Insurgent Regiment, regiment commander Lashkevich
  - 21st Veselo-Ternovsky: regiment commander Berkovsky, Veseloternovatoe
  - 24th Ternovsky regiment: regiment commander Timofey Cherniy, Dmitry Ivanovich Popov, Ternovka
  - 28th Alexander Regiment, Zaporozhye
  - 1st Kuban Cavalry Regiment,
  - 2nd Ekaterinoslav Cavalry Regiment, Dnipro
  - Garkusha detachment.
- 1st cavalry brigade: brigade commander Shchus
- 2nd brigade: brigade commander Vdovichenko.
  - 3rd Don Cavalry Regiment,
  - Pavlovsky detachment,
  - 4th Novospassovsky regiment, Osypenko
  - 1st artillery battalion,
- 3rd brigade: brigade commander Havrylenko. Assigned 5 guns: four 3-inch and one mountain.
  - 3rd artillery battalion.
  - 8th cavalry regiment,
  - 10th Gulyaypole regiment, Huliaipole
  - 11th Lubitsky Regiment, Lubitskoe
- 3rd shock Crimean brigade: brigade commander Bondarev.
- 4th brigade: brigade commander Uralov. Assigned 8 guns: two English 3-inch, five Russian 3-inch, one mountain and of which one long-range.
  - 26th Tavrichesky regiment: regiment commander Ishchenko.
  - 30th Berdyansk regiment, Berdyansk
  - 42nd Nagaysky regiment, regiment commander Golik, Prymorsk
- 5th brigade: brigade commander Mirzlikin. Assigned one 3-inch gun.
  - 13th Kazan regiment
  - 16th Tavrichesky regiment: regiment commander Bukin
  - 19th Melitopol: regiment commander Ryumshin
- 6th brigade: brigade commander Pavlovsky.
  - 62nd Dnieper Regiment
  - 66th Crimean regiment: regiment commander Volodin
  - 7th Cavalry Regiment.
- Supply Department of the 1st Donetsk Corps
- Horse Intelligence Corps
- Commandant company
- Strike group.

== See also ==
- 2nd Azov Corps
- Donbas Battalion
- Donetsk Army
- 383rd Rifle Division

== Bibliography ==
- Belash, Alexander; Belash, Victor (1993). Дороги Нестора Махно (in Russian).
- Makhno, Nestor (2006). Danilov, V.; Shanin, T. (eds.). Крестьянское движение на Украине. 1918—1921: Документы и материалы. Крестьянская революция в России. 1902—1922 гг.: Документы и материалы (in Russian). Moscow: "Russian political encyclopedia" (ROSSPEN). p. 1000.
