= Mikhail Uralov =

Russian anarchist

Bat'ko Mikhail Uralov
- Михаил Уралов
- Born: 1889
- Died: c. 1949 (aged 59–60); Moscow, Soviet Union
- Military career
- Allegiance: Makhnovshchina
- Service: Revolutionary Insurgent Army of Ukraine
- Service years: 1918–1921
- Rank: Commander
- Unit: 1st Donetsk Corps
- Commands: 4th Brigade
- Conflicts: Ukrainian War of Independence: Battle of Peregonovka

Mikhail Uralov (Russian: Михаил Уралов) was a Russian anarchist, the head of the "Black Guard" combat units of the Moscow Federation of Anarchists, and a commander of the Revolutionary Insurgent Army of Ukraine.

== Biography ==
Born in 1889, Uralov joined the Mensheviks during the 1905 Russian Revolution, before going on to join the Socialist Revolutionary Party and later the anarchists. He enlisted as sailor during World War I. Following the October Revolution, in 1918, Uralov became the commander of a unit of Black Guards, established by the Moscow Federation of Anarchist Groups (MFAG). After the victory of the Makhnovshchina over the Central Powers in the Ukrainian War of Independence, he travelled to Huliaipole and joined the Revolutionary Insurgent Army of Ukraine (RIAU). In February 1919, he was a delegate to the Second Regional Congress of Peasants, Workers and Insurgents. There he argued against Nestor Makhno's policy of mass mobilisation, as he believed that a volunteer military would be more effective. But he was unsuccessful in his appeals and the RIAU issued a mobilisation order, compelling many new recruits into their ranks.

Following the integration of the anarchists into the 3rd Trans-Dnieper Brigade of the Red Army, Uralov joined Oleksandr Kalashnykov's 7th Regiment. During the subsequent months, the 7th Regiment captured Berdiansk and Mariupol from the White movement. In August 1919, Kalashnykov led his regiment in a mutiny against the Red command, reuniting with other Makhnovists in Dobrovelychkivka, where they were reorganized into the 1st Donetsk Corps of the RIAU. Uralov was subsequently elected the commander of the 4th brigade of the 1st Donetsk Corps and appointed as Makhno's personal adjutant. Following the Makhnovist victory in the Battle of Peregonovka, Uralov was elected the head of the Makhnovist garrison in the city of Berdiansk. In late October-early November 1919, he was placed in command of a detachment of Vdovichenko's second group, created to liberate the Huliaipole region from the White Army.

At the Fourth Regional Congress of Peasants, Workers and Insurgents, which took place in Oleksandrivsk in November 1919, he was elected to the Makhnovshchina's Military Revolutionary Council (VRS), which had Volin as its chairperson. In the aftermath of the Polonsky conspiracy, the VRS appointed Uralov, Volin and Viktor Bilash to investigate the events, as it had considered the RIAU to have "overstepped its bounds" by unilaterally executing Yevgeny Polonsky without its consent. Uralov and Bilash immediately sided with Makhno, eventually bringing Volin over to their side and negotiating a settlement between the VRS and the RIAU.

During the outbreak of the Bolshevik–Makhnovist conflict in January 1920, Uralov initially issued an appeal in which he condemned Makhno for speaking out against the Communist Party. Soon after, he was arrested by the Berdiansk Cheka, but was later released in March. In May 1920, Uralov was put in charge of the RIAU's political work, collaborating with Peter Arshinov, Juda Grossman and Volin on writing articles for The Road to Freedom.

After the war, he moved to Simferopol, where he held a series of anarchist meetings at his apartment. Between 1921 and 1924, he was arrested three times by the Cheka for anti-Soviet agitation. He went on to work as a construction foreman for the Ministry of Aviation Industry during World War II. In 1949, he was arrested by the Ministry of State Security as part of a purge of "Trotsykists, rightists and anarchists", disappearing into the Gulag.

== Bibliography ==
- Bilash, Oleksandr; Bilash, Viktor (1993). Дороги Нестора Махно (in Russian). Kyiv: РВЦ "Проза". ISBN 978-5-7707-3814-8. OCLC 429142607.
- Danilov, V.; Shanin, T., eds. (2006). "Nestor Makhno. Крестьянское движение на Украине. 1918—1921: Документы и материалы". Russian political encyclopedia. Крестьянская революция в России. 1902—1922 гг.: Документы и материалы (in Russian). Moscow: ROSSPEN.
- Darch, Colin (2020). Nestor Makhno and Rural Anarchism in Ukraine, 1917–1921. London: Pluto Press. doi:10.2307/j.ctv16zjhb1. ISBN 9781786805263. OCLC 1225942343. S2CID 224949062.
- Krivenky, V. V. (1998). Анархисты: документы и материалы, 1883-1935 гг [Anarchists: Documents and Materials, 1883–1935, in two volumes] (in Russian). Vol. 2. Moscow: ROSSPEN. ISBN 978-5-86004-068-7. OCLC 40589563.
- Malet, Michael (1982). Nestor Makhno in the Russian Civil War. London: Palgrave Macmillan. pp. 44, 52, 111, 177. ISBN 978-0-333-25969-6. OCLC 8514426.
