= Ternovka =

Ternovka (Russian: Терновка) is the name of several rural localities in Russia:

- Ternovka, Belgorod Oblast, a selo in Yakovlevsky District of Belgorod Oblast
- Ternovka, Lipetsk Oblast, a village in Storozhevskoy Selsoviet of Usmansky District of Lipetsk Oblast
- Ternovka, Moscow Oblast, a village under the administrative jurisdiction of the Town of Naro-Fominsk in Naro-Fominsky District of Moscow Oblast
- Ternovka, Balashovsky District, Saratov Oblast, a selo in Balashovsky District, Saratov Oblast
- Ternovka, Engelssky District, Saratov Oblast, a selo in Engelssky District, Saratov Oblast
- Ternovka, Vladimir Oblast, a selo in Yuryev-Polsky District of Vladimir Oblast
- Ternovka, Frolovsky District, Volgograd Oblast, a khutor in Ternovsky Selsoviet of Frolovsky District of Volgograd Oblast
- Ternovka, Kamyshinsky District, Volgograd Oblast, a selo in Ternovsky Selsoviet of Kamyshinsky District of Volgograd Oblast
- Ternovka, Rossoshansky District, Voronezh Oblast, a selo in Starokalitvenskoye Rural Settlement of Rossoshansky District of Voronezh Oblast
- Ternovka, Ternovsky District, Voronezh Oblast, a selo in Ternovskoye Rural Settlement of Ternovsky District of Voronezh Oblast
