= 5th Army (RSFSR) =

Field army of the Red Army during the Russian Civil War

The 5th Army was a field army of the Red Army during the Russian Civil War. The 5th Army was formed four times. The first formation was between the beginning of March 1918 and April as a reaction to the Austro-German occupation of Ukraine. The second formation was created between April 1918 and 23 June 1918 to defend Tsaritsyn, the third formation between August 16, 1918, and September 6, 1922, as a part of the Eastern Front and the fourth formation between November 16, 1922, and June 1924 in the Far East.

== History ==
=== First formation ===
On March 17, 1918, the Second All-Ukrainian Congress of Soviets decided to create armed forces to counter foreign and contra-revolutionary forces. Five armies of some 3,000 -3,500 men were created. In fact, these armies were only brigades with limited combat capabilities. Rudolf Sivers became the commander of the 5th Army, which counted some 3,000 men. In March 1918, it defended the area of Kursk, Novhorod-Siverskyi, Bakhmach, Konotop and Vorozhba. It withdrew from Kharkov on April 8 and fought in skirmishes in the area near Kupyansk. On April 10 was renamed to the 2nd Special Army, by the beginning of May it was added to the Voronezh group.

=== Second formation ===
In the middle of April 1918, the 5th Army was created a second time from the detachments of the group of Kliment Voroshilov, who was appointed commander of the Army. The 5th Army then consisted of around 2,000 men and acted together with the 2nd Special Army around Kupyansk and Chertkovo. By April 20, together with the Donetsk Army (which was merged with the 5th Army at the end of April) and part of the 3rd Army, it concentrated in the region of Lugansk-Rodakovo. Here it was decided to defend Lugansk under General Command of Kliment Voroshilov. On April 25 – 26, the 5th Army defeated two German infantry divisions, capturing 2 batteries, 20 machine guns and two aircraft. However, under the onslaught of the superior forces of the enemy, Lugansk was abandoned on April 28, and the 5th Army withdrew to Millerovo and Tsaritsyn, taking with them families of workers, valuable industrial equipment, military property, 100 locomotives and more than 3,000 wagons. All along the way, they were harassed by German troops and White Cossacks. Having withstood persistent attacks by White Cossacks from June 16 to July 2, the Soviet troops crossed to the left bank of the Don and met on July 2 with troops of the Tsaritsyn front. By order of the North Caucasian Military District of June 23, 1918, the 5th and 3rd armies and the Tsaritsyn Front, as well as detachments formed by the population of Donetsk and Morozovsky district, were united in the Voroshilov Group, which from mid-July 1918 was the main force in the defense of Tsaritsyn.

=== Third formation ===
The 5th Army was created a third time on August 16, 1918, from the troops in the Kazan area. It was part of the Eastern Front. On January 15, 1920, it became directly subordinate to the Revolutionary Military Council, and from 20 April 1920 to the Siberian Military District.

It fought in the district of Kazan against White Guards and the Czechoslovak Legion and took Kazan on September 10, 1918. In the autumn–winter of 1918 the enemy's troops were pursued in the direction of Chistopol, Bugulma and Menzelinsk, and Ufa was taken on December 31, 1918. In March–May 1919, during the Spring Offensive of the White Russian Army, it retreated from the Ufa area. It participated in the Counteroffensive of the Eastern front, in which it took Zlatoust (July 13) and Chelyabinsk (July 24). Forcing its way over the Tobol River, it conducted the Petropavlovsk Operation and occupied Petropavlovsk (October 31) and Omsk (November 14, 1919). It pursued the enemy along the Siberian railway line, took Tomsk (December 20, 1919), Krasnoyarsk (January 7, 1920) and waged battles in the Irkutsk region.

In May 1920, the army was transferred to the Assistant commander in chief of the armed Forces of the Republic of Siberia, and later became part of the East Siberian Military District. On October 1, 1920, the chief of staff of the operational department, Semyon Mikhailovich Sharangovich, was sent from Irkutsk to Kharkiv with half of the army headquarters to replenish the headquarters of the Southern Front.

The 5th Army participated in the Invasion of Mongolia (May–August 1921), with the aim of defeating the Army of Roman von Ungern-Sternberg. The 5th Army was disbanded on September 6, 1922, and the troops transferred to the East Siberian Military District.

=== Fourth Formation ===
Оn 20 July 1922, the 104th Balagansk Rifle Brigade was reorganized into the 1st Transbaikal Rifle Division of the People's Revolutionary Army of the Soviet puppet state known as the Far Eastern Republic. The division defended the border with Manchuria from its formation, and between 4 and 25 October took part in the Primorsky operation to defeat the Zemskaya Rat, the last remnants of the Whites in the Far East. During the operation, the 1st Transbaikal Rifle Division fought in the capture of Grodekovo, Nikolsk-Ussuriysky, and Vladivostok.

The fourth time, the 5th Army was created by order of the All-Russian Central Executive Committee of the RSFSR of November 16, 1922 by renaming the People's Revolutionary Army of the Far Eastern Republic. The 1st Transbaikal Rifle Division stayed under command of the new 5th Army (fourth formation). The 1st Transbaikal Rifle Division was based at Vladivostok. In honor of its defeat of White troops on the shores of Pacific and basing on the Pacific coast, the division was redesignated the 1st Pacific Rifle Division (Russian: 1-я Тихоокеанская стрелковая дивизия) on 22 November 1922.

The troops of the 5th Army served to guard and defend the Soviet Far Eastern borders, and, together with the border guards, fight against the White Guard troops of G.M. Semyonov and the remnants of the invaders. On January 24, 1923, the army became subordinated to the Commander-in-Chief of the Armed Forces of the Republic with army headquarters in the city of Chita. For distinction in battles during the liberation of Primorye and Vladivostok, the Revolutionary Military Council of the USSR, by order of July 1, 1923, awarded the 5th Army the honorary title of the Red Banner.

In June 1924 the army was disbanded, and its units and institutions were transferred to the recruitment of the 18th and 19th Rifle Corps of the Siberian Military District.

The 1st Transbaikal Rifle Division shifted into the 19th Rifle Corps of the Siberian Military District in June 1929.

== Commanders ==
=== Commanders ===
- Pēteris Slavens (August 16 – October 20, 1918),
- Jan Blumbergs (October 20, 1918 – April 5, 1919),
- Mikhail Tukhachevsky (5 April – 25 November 1919),
- Genrich Eiche (25 November 1919 – 21 January 1920),
- Gavril Kutyrev (Acting, 24 January – 3 February 1920),
- Vilhelm Garf (Acting, 3–8 February 1920)
- Mikhail Matiyasevich (February 8, 1920 – August 27, 1921),
- Ieronim Uborevich (August 27, 1921 – August 14, 1922),
- Vladimir Lyubimov (Acting, August 14 – 24, 1922)
- Kasyan Chaykovsky (24 August – 6 September 1922)
- Ieronim Uborevich (November 22, 1922 – June 1924).

=== Members of the Revolutionary Military Council include ===
- Arkady Rosengolts
- Valery Mezhlauk
- Vladimir Smirnov
- Ivan Smirnov
- Boris Pozern
- Boris Shumyatsky

== Sources ==
- History of the Red 5th Army By Tom Hillman
