= Tymofiy Lashkevych =

Ukrainian anarcho-communist (died 1920)

- Тимофій Лашкевич
- Born: 1890s Ukraine
- Died: 19 March 1920; Velyka Novosilka, Donetsk, Ukraine
- Military career
- Allegiance: Makhnovshchina
- Service: Red Army (1918–1919), Revolutionary Insurgent Army of Ukraine (1919–1920)
- Service years: 1918–1920
- Unit: 1st Donetsk Corps

Tymofiy Lashkevych (1890s – 19 March 1920) was a Ukrainian anarcho-communist that fought with the Makhnovists during the Ukrainian War of Independence as commander of the 1st Donetsk Corps.

== Biography ==
Tymofiy Lashkevych was born at the end of the nineteenth century into a Ukrainian family.

In 1918, Lashkevych joined the Bolshevik Party, he was drafted into the Red Army and was assistant commander of the 13th Soviet Regiment. In September 1919, Lashkevych joined the Revolutionary Insurgent Army of Ukraine, in which he commanded the 13th Insurgent Regiment. In early October, Lashkevych was the head of the Zaporozhye garrison. In Zaporozhye, to combat drunkenness within his ranks, Lashkevych issued a decree on the garrison banning the sale of alcohol to the rebels in the city.

On 28 October 1919, the 13th regiment occupied Yekaterinoslav, and sank the defenders of the city with the 4th consolidated division and a brigade of guards. With the occupation of the city, Lashkevych was elected head of the garrison of Yekaterinoslav. As the head of the Yekaterinoslav garrison, Lashkevych received 5 million rubles of indemnity, but he did not turn it over to the army cashier.

In 1920, for a short time, Lashkevych was the commander of the 1st Donetsk Corps. In early 1920, he was captured by the Reds, but was able to escape.

In January 1920, Lashkevych arrived in Velyka Novosilka, where he organized parties at the expense of the army. On 18 March 1920, Viktor Belash arrived in Velyka Novosilka and met with Lashkevych, who described it as "[...] very joyful. Everyone kissed him, hugged him and asked him how he ran away from the communists." At this time, local rebels, the Greeks, began to come to the headquarters and tell what a riotous life Lashkevych led in the village. Belash demanded a report on the waste from the latter, to which Lashkevych replied: "I am guilty." On the same day, there was a meeting of commanders on the Lashkevych case, which sentenced him to death.

Lashkevych was arrested on 19 March. Soon Nestor Makhno arrived at Velyka Novosilka. Local residents and rebels gathered in the center of the village, and Lashkevych was brought there to be shot. He was shot at twice, but both times there was a misfire. Lashkevych started to run and the rebels fired two volleys at him. When one approached the fallen Tymofiy to put a bullet in his head, Lashkevych looked at him and said: “At least I lived [my life]!”

== Bibliography ==
- Belash, Alexander; Belash, Victor (1993). Дороги Нестора Махно (in Russian).
- Makhno, Nestor (2006). "Крестьянское движение на Украине. 1918—1921: Документы и материалы". In V. Danilov and T. Shanin (ed.). Крестьянская революция в России. 1902—1922 гг.: Документы и материалы. Krestʹi︠a︡nskai︠a︡ revoli︠u︡t︠s︡ii︠a︡ v Rossii, 1902-1922 gg. (in Russian). Moscow: ROSSPEN. OCLC 654282295.
