= Oleksandr Kalashnykov =

Ukrainian anarchist and commander (died 1920)

- Олександр Калашников
- Born: 1890s Baku, Russian Empire
- Died: June 1920; Barvinkove, Kharkiv, Ukraine
- Military career
- Allegiance: Makhnovshchina
- Service: Revolutionary Insurgent Army of Ukraine
- Service years: 1918-1920
- Unit: 1st Donetsk Corps
- Conflicts: Ukrainian War of Independence

Oleksandr Kalashnykov (1890s – 1920) was a Ukrainian anarchist and a commander of the 1st Donetsk Corps of the Revolutionary Insurgent Army of Ukraine.

== Biography ==
Oleksandr Kalashnykov was born at the end of the nineteenth century in the city of Baku. The son of a worker, he came to live in Huliaipole, before going to fight on the Eastern Front of World War I as a non-commissioned officer. After the February Revolution, he returned to Huliaipole, where he became the secretary of the Union of Poor Peasants. With the town's anarchist group, Kalashnykov organized an agricultural commune on the Klassen estate.

Following the invasion of Ukraine by the Central Powers, Kalashnykov was arrested by the newly-established Ukrainian State and imprisoned in Oleksandrivsk, where he awaited execution alongside Savelii Makhno. But in November 1918, the authorities were overthrown by the Directorate of Ukraine and all political prisoners were freed. These included Kalashnykov and Makhno, who immediately returned home to Huliaipole and joined the insurgents led by Savelii's brother Nestor. On 27 December 1918, Kalashnykov led a partisan band on a morning train to Katerynoslav, which they bloodlessly captured from the Ukrainian People's Army.

Following the integration of the anarchists into the 3rd Trans-Dnieper Brigade, in February 1919, Kalashnykov was elected the commander of the brigade's 7th Regiment. On 15 March, the 7th Regiment moved against Berdiansk. On the outskirts of Berdiansk, Kalashnykov's Regiment held off from entering the city until 28 March, in order to allow the civilian inhabitants to escape. In Berdiansk, Kalashnykov was instructed to arrest and prosecute everyone who collaborated with the White movement. During the city's occupation, Kalashnykov was alleged to have committed a number of war crimes, including the torture and execution of captured prisoners of war.

At the end of March, Kalashnykov and his regiment went to Mariupol. At the beginning of June, there were already 7,000 Makhnovists in the 7th Regiment. In August, the political commissar of the 7th Regiment, Kochergin, ordered the arrest of Kalashnykov. But before this could happen, Kalashnykov led his regiment in a mutiny against the Red command, capturing Kochergin's headquarters in Novyi Buh. Members of the Regiment wanted to shoot him and his wife, but Kalashnykov stood up for them and spared their lives. On 30 August, at the Pomichna station, Kalashnykov fought two armored trains with several echelons of Red Army soldiers who were retreating from Odesa.

On 1 September, a meeting of rebels took place in Dobrovelychkivka, where the restructuring of the army and further actions of the Makhnovists were discussed. Kalashnykov was elected commander of the newly created 1st Donetsk Corps. Following the Battle of Peregonovka, the head of the RIAU set the task for Kalashnykov to move north and occupy Katerynoslav, but he did not complete the task. Ignoring orders, he instead moved to Kryvyi Rih and occupied it. The Kherson group was allocated to Camelyuzhki, which was supposed to turn it toward Katerynoslav.

On 1 October, a commission was created to investigate the reasons for Kalashnykov's non-execution of the order, on the same day it was disbanded, and Viktor Bilash limited himself to issuing a severe reprimand in the order. In mid-October, the command was still expecting that Kalashnykov would go to Katerynoslav, but this did not happen. On 10 October, he arrived in Oleksandrivsk where he explained his actions:

“Why did you take the cavalry away from me, you snatched away the shunting detachments (Kazansky, Vaschenko, Uralov) - with what could I go to Katerynoslav?”

In November, Kalashnykov was appointed head of the defense of Oleksandrivsk. On 29 May 1920, the Makhnovists occupied Oleksandrivka, in which they elected a new composition of the Military Revolutionary Council. Kalashnykov was elected head of the operational department of the SRPU. By the beginning of the Bolshevik–Makhnovist conflict, the SRPU was at the head of all the rebel detachments, which Kalashnykov had been part of since summer.

At the end of June 1920, he died in Barvinkove.

== Bibliography ==
- Bilash, Oleksandr; Bilash, Viktor (1993). Дороги Нестора Махно (in Russian). Kyiv: РВЦ "Проза". ISBN 978-5-7707-3814-8. OCLC 429142607.
- Danilov, Victor Petrovich (2006). "Нестор Махно. Крестьянское движение на Украине. 1918—1921: Документы и материалы". In V. Danilov; T. Shanin (eds.). Российская политическая энциклопедия. Крестьянская революция в России. 1902—1922 гг.: Документы и материалы (in Russian). Moscow: ROSSPEN. p. 1000. ISBN 978-5-8243-0769-6. OCLC 741204339.
- Darch, Colin (2020). Nestor Makhno and Rural Anarchism in Ukraine, 1917-1921. London: Pluto Press. ISBN 978-1-78680-526-3. OCLC 1225942343.
- Malet, Michael (1982). Nestor Makhno in the Russian Civil War. London: Palgrave Macmillan. ISBN 978-0-333-25969-6. OCLC 8514426.
- Skirda, Alexandre (2004) [1982]. Nestor Makhno–Anarchy's Cossack: The Struggle for Free Soviets in the Ukraine 1917–1921. Translated by Sharkey, Paul. Oakland: AK Press. ISBN 978-1-902593-68-5. OCLC 60602979.
