= Brova (surname) =

Brova is a surname. Notable people with the surname include:

- Horden Brova (born 1991), Ukrainian volleyball player
- Mykhailo Brova (d. 1921), Ukrainian anarchist military commander
