= Mykhailo Brova =

Ukrainian Makhnovist

- Михайло Брова
- Born: c. 1890s Novohryhorivka, Bakhmut, Katerynoslav, Russian Empire
- Died: December 1921; North Caucasus, Russian Soviet Republic
- Military career
- Allegiance: Russian Empire (1914-1917); Makhnovshchina (1918-1921)
- Service: Imperial Russian Navy (1914-1917); Revolutionary Insurgent Army of Ukraine (1918-1921)
- Service years: 1914–1921
- Rank: Otaman
- Conflicts: World War I Ukrainian War of Independence

Mykhailo Brova (died 1921) was a Ukrainian anarchist military commander and member of the Makhnovist movement. He was a delegate to the Regional Congresses and member of each convocation of the Military Revolutionary Council.

== Biography ==
Mykhailo Brova was born in the late 19th century into a peasant family in the village of Novohryhorivka. From an early age, he worked as a locksmith at the Avdiivka station near Yuzivka.

In 1904 he became an anarcho-communist and took part in the 1905 Revolution. Following the outbreak of World War I, he was drafted to the Eastern Front, where he served in the navy.

In June 1918, he established one of the first anarchist insurgent detachments in Ukraine and fought against the Central Powers in Dibrivka. In August 1918, he was seriously wounded in the battle and his command passed to Fedir Shchus. By autumn 1918, he had joined the Makhnovist movement, becoming a permanent member of its Military Revolutionary Council (VRS). During autumn-winter campaign of 1919, he was a military commander in the Revolutionary Insurgent Army of Ukraine (RIAU), and led the struggle against Anton Denikin's Volunteer Army.

At the beginning of January 1920, at the head of 400-strong anarchist detachment, he began a guerrilla struggle against the Red Army in Novomoskovsk. During this period, his unit acted largely as a scouting unit that supplied larger insurgent detachments with information on Red Army positions in the Katerynoslav region. In the middle of February, Brova was arrested by security officers during an underground meeting of the district's Makhnovist commanders. He was moved to a prison in Katerynoslav, but escaped in April 1920 and resumed his guerrilla campaign. By the summer of 1920, he re-established contact with the RIAU command and was appointed as a representative of the Revolutionary Insurgent Council in Novomoskovsk, where he led his guerrilla movement in late 1920.

After the conclusion of the Starobilsk agreement with the Ukrainian Soviet government in October 1920, Brova's detachment stopped fighting against the Reds and transferred to the southern front. But on 16 November 1920, he returned to Novomoskovsk to establish a new Makhnovist unit. When the Bolshevik-Makhnovist conflict resumed in December 1920, Brova returned to guerrilla warfare against the Red Army in command of a small and isolated insurgent detachment. He organized a detachment of 400 cavalry and 300 infantry, at the head of which he again conducted guerrilla warfare in the districts of Verkhnedniprovsk, Pavlohrad and Novomoskovsk, managing to escape from encirclement several times. On 2 December 1920, Brova led his detachment in routing a Red hussar brigade at Komar.

On 9 February 1921, the Red cavalry commander Grigori Maslakov defected to the Makhnovists, joining Brova's detachment at Pavlohrad. Maslakov himself took command of the united detachment and Brova became its chief of staff. In March 1921, the Insurgent Army dispatched Maslakov and Brova to the Don and Kuban, where they were tasked with spreading the insurrection. Their detachment was reformed into the independent Caucasian Insurgent Army and they marched towards the North Caucasus. In early 1921, the army captured many mountainous regions and villages from the Reds, and raided small towns. The army enjoyed support from the local population and its numbers increased rapidly, from 1,000 to 10,000 people.

As the Red cavalry proved to have little effect against the insurgent forces in Ukraine, in May 1921, they were transferred towards the Don to put down Brova's insurgency. By August 1921, the Red Army had concentrated considerable forces in the area and began taking hostages and committing mass shootings, which inflicted a number of heavy defeats on the army. The army disintegrated into several small isolated units, one of which was led by Mykhailo Brova.

In December 1921, Brova was murdered by a Cheka agent who had infiltrated his unit.

== Bibliography ==
- Bilash, Oleksandr; Bilash, Viktor (1993). Дороги Нестора Махно (in Russian). Kyiv: РВЦ "Проза". ISBN 9785770738148. OCLC 429142607.
- Skirda, Alexandre (2004) [1982]. Nestor Makhno–Anarchy's Cossack: The Struggle for Free Soviets in the Ukraine 1917–1921. Translated by Sharkey, Paul. Oakland: AK Press. ISBN 978-1-902593-68-5. OCLC 60602979.
