= Osypenko rural hromada =

Osypenko rural hromada Осипенківська селищна громада
- Hromada
- Interactive map of Osypenko rural hromada
- Country: Ukraine
- Oblast: Zaporizhzhia Oblast
- Raion: Berdiansk Raion
- Admin. center: Osypenko

Area
  - Total: 419.6 km^{2} (162.0 sq mi)

Population (2020)
  - Total: 7,365
  - Density: 17.55/km^{2} (45.46/sq mi)
- Settlements: 7
- Rural settlements: 1
- Villages: 6

Osypenko rural hromada (Ukrainian: Осипенківська селищна громада) is a hromada of Ukraine, located in Berdiansk Raion, Zaporizhzhia Oblast. Its administrative center is the village of Osypenko.

It has an area of 419.6 square kilometres (162.0 mi^{2}) and a population of 7365, as of 2020.

The hromada contains 7 settlements, including 6 villages:

- Chervone Pole
- Derevetske
- Kulykivske
- Novopetrivka
- Osypenko
- Staropetrivka

And 1 rural-type settlement: Berdianske.

== See also ==
- List of hromadas of Ukraine
