= 2nd Azov Corps =

Military unit

- 2-й Азовский корпус
- Active: 1 September 1919–11 January 1920
- Country: Ukraine
- Allegiance: Makhnovshchina
- Branch: Revolutionary Insurgent Army of Ukraine
- Type: Partisan corps
- Size: 21,000
- Garrison/HQ: Azov
- Equipment: 21,000 bayonets, 385 sabers, 176 machine guns, 16 cannons.
- Engagements: Ukrainian War of Independence: Battle of Peregonovka; Raid of the 2nd Azov Corps; Battle of Berdyansk; Battle of Mariupol

Commanders
- Commander: Trofim Vdovichenko
- Chief of Staff: Feofan Mironov

The 2nd Azov Corps was a military formation of the Revolutionary Insurgent Army of Ukraine, one of the 4 corps that was created on 1 September 1919, and existed until 1920.

== History ==
On 1 September 1919, a meeting of insurgents was held in Dobrovelychkivka, at which a delegate was elected from each regiment. The meeting discussed the question of the further political existence of the Makhnovshchina as an independent organism. They also discussed the issue of reorganizing the insurgent regiments into a single army that would be effective in guerrilla warfare. The meeting elected a Military Revolutionary Council, as the central command of the insurgents. The insurgent regiments led by Nestor Makhno were officially named the Revolutionary Insurgent Army of Ukraine (RIAU). Viktor Belash was in charge of organizing the army. Belash developed the structure of the RIAU, which consisted of four corps (three active and one reserve), each built from a number of divisions, which were in turn divided into regiments, battalions, companies and platoons. Vdovichenko was appointed at the head of the 2nd Azov Corps.

On 27 September 1919, the 1st corps took part in the Battle of Peregonovka, in which the RIAU won a major victory. On 28 September 1919, Makhno decided to conduct a deep raid on Katerynoslav, in which the 1st corps also took part. The Insurgent Army set off on a march in three main columns for the raid. The infantry in carts and cavalry made daily marches of 80–90 versts. The right column, which was made up of the infantry units of the 2nd corps, advanced 315 versts through Peschanyy Brod, Sofiyevka, Dolinskaya, Kryvyi Rih, Apostolove and Nikopol.

On 8 October, the corps occupied Berdyansk, on 9 October – Prymorsk, Osipenko, on 14 October it occupied Mariupol, from here Vdovichenko sent the 2nd cavalry brigade to occupy the city of Taganrog, which was Denikin's headquarters. By the evening of 16 October, the 2nd cavalry brigade occupied Novoazovsk, 65 versts west of Taganrog. By this time, Karani had occupied the railway line from Mariupol to the station with Vdovichenko's infantry, leading an offensive on Volnovakha, where there was a White Guard group guarding the artillery base. On 24 October 1919, the corps commander, Vdovichenko, issued order No. 1 to the "Urban and Rural Councils, other organizations and authorities" for the arrest of deserters who left the Insurgent Army.

On 11 January 1920, at a meeting of commanders in Huliaipole, it was decided to send the 2nd corps to the Berdyansk and Mariupol districts, where it would then dissolve. In the Mariupol district in the spring of 1920, Foma Kozhyn's formations of 100 sabers with 30 tachankas and Maskalevsky's 500 cavalry, collected from the remnants of the 2nd corps, were raided.

== Composition ==
- 1st cavalry brigade
- 2nd cavalry brigade:
  - 4th Novospasovskiy regiment.
  - 6th Mariupol regiment
- 3rd cavalry brigade

== See also ==
- 1st Donetsk Corps

== Bibliography ==
- Belash, Alexander; Belash, Victor (1993). Дороги Нестора Махно (in Russian).
- Makhno, Nestor (2006). V. Danilov and T. Shanin (ed.). Крестьянское движение на Украине. 1918—1921: Документы и материалы. Крестьянская революция в России. 1902—1922 гг.: Документы и материалы (in Russian). Moscow: "Russian political encyclopedia" (ROSSPEN). p. 1000.
