= 14th Cavalry Division (Soviet Union) =

- 14-я кавалерийская дивизия
- Active: 20 January 1920 – 25 December 1941
- Disbanded: 25 December 1941
- Country: Soviet Union
- Allegiance: Red Army
- Branch: Army
- Type: Cavalry
- Garrison/HQ: Kiev Military District
- Engagements: Polish-Soviet War: Battle of Antonów; Battle of Chołojów; Battle of Komarów; World War II: Soviet invasion of Poland; Soviet occupation of Bessarabia; Operation Barbarossa
- Decorations: Order of Lenin; Order of the Red Banner; Order of the Red Star

The 14th Cavalry Division (Russian: 14-я кавалерийская дивизия, romanized: 14-ya kavaleriyskaya diviziya), formerly known as the 14th Maikop Cavalry Division, was a military unit in the Red Army during the Russian Civil War, the Polish-Soviet War, and World War II. It was formed on 20 January 1920 and dissolved on 25 December 1941.

== History ==
The unit was formed on 20 January 1920. In November 1921, it was renamed to the 14th Maikop Cavalry Division. In August 1924, the unit was again renamed to the 14th Maikop Cavalry Division of the Communist Youth International, and its division number was changed to "10".

The unit fought against the Armed Forces of South Russia during the Russian Civil War, and later with Polish forces during the Polish-Soviet War. On 14 August, the unit was engaged in combat with the 1st Cavalry Division at Chołojów. After a defeat at the Battle of Komarów, the unit no longer played a major role on the front.

In 1930, the previous division number was restored, and the unit was redesignated as the 14th Cavalry Division of the Communist Youth Internationale named after A. J. Parkhomenko

In September 1939, the unit took part in the Soviet invasion of Poland as part of the 2nd Cavalry Corps. The unit later took part in the Soviet occupation of Bessarabia, as well as combat actions against Germany during Operation Barbarossa.

== Staff of the division command ==
=== Division leaders ===
- Grigori Maslakov, from 30 January 1920 until 10 March 1920.
- Alexander Parkhomenko, from 21 April 1920 until 3 January 1921.
- Brigadier General G. I. Kokoriev (c. 1936).
- Brigadier General Vasily Kruchenkiy (c. 1939).

== Unit composition ==
=== During the Polish-Soviet War ===
The composition of the unit during the Polish-Soviet War is as following:

- 1st Cavalry Brigade of the 14th Cavalry Division
  - 79th Cavalry Regiment
  - 80th Cavalry Regiment
- 2nd Cavalry Brigade of the 14th Cavalry Division
  - 81st Cavalry Regiment
  - 82nd Cavalry Regiment
- 3rd Cavalry Brigade of the 14th Cavalry Division
  - 83rd Cavalry Regiment
  - 84th Cavalry Regiment

=== In 1939 ===
The composition of the unit in 1939 is as following:

- Division Command of the 14th Cavalry Division
- 55th Dubno Cavalry Regiment
- 56th Apsheron Cavalry Regiment
- 57th Chorup Cavalry Regiment
- 14th Mechanized Regiment
- 14th Horse Artillery Regiment
- 14th Independent Communications Squadron
- 14th Independent Pioneer Squadron
