= Gavril Kutyrev =

Russian and Soviet officer (1887–1944)

- Born: March 27, 1887 the village of Uryupinskaya, Donskoy army area
- Died: March 3, 1944 (aged 56); Rostov-on-Don, Soviet Union
- Military career
- Allegiance: Russian Empire; Soviet Union
- Branch: Imperial Russian Army; Soviet Red Army
- Commands: 5th Army (RSFSR)
- Conflicts: World War I Russian Civil War

Gavril Yakovlevich Kutyrev (Russian: Гавриил Яковлевич Кутырëв; March 27, 1887 - March 3, 1944) was a participant in the Russian Civil War, and held the ranks of Yesaul and interim commander of the 5th Army of the Red Army.

== Biography ==
The son of the officer Jacob Arkhipovich Kutyrev. Educated in a real school, 6 classes. He graduated from the Novocherkassk Cossack School in 1908. In 1908-1915, in the Don Cossacks. In 1916-1917, the senior adjutant for the operational headquarters of the 84th Infantry Division, the chief of staff of the same division. He graduated from the crash course of the Nikolaev Military Academy in 1917. An officer of the General Staff since 1918, was appointed to the headquarters of the Moscow defense district. Voluntarily entered the Red Army. Head of the intelligence department of the headquarters of the military commander of the Moscow district of defense in 1918, head of the registration department of the Field Headquarters of the RVSR in 1918-1919. Chief of Staff of the 12th Army from June 15 to October 7, 1919. Acting Chief of Staff of the 5th Army from December 1, 1919 to February 15, 1920, temporary acting commander of the 5th Army from January 24 to February 3, 1920, head of the Operations Directorate 5th Army headquarters from February to March 15, 1920. Head of the military unit of the Ural military district on March 25, 1920. In 1920-1921 he was chief of staff of the Don region troops, temporarily serving as commander of the Don region troops. At the disposal of the Chief of Staff of the Separate Caucasian Army on June 28, 1921. Chief of Staff of the Batumi fortified area from August 25, 1921.

== Repression ==
In 1919, a member of the 12th Army PBC A.A. Semashko was arrested by the Special Division of the Cheka with his chief of staff G. Ya. Kutyrev.

Leon Trotsky addressed the Central Committee of the RCP (B.) On August 11, 1919: “Please inform me why Semashko was arrested. I remind you that this is a party worker with serious merits in terms of organization of formations. His crime on the Western Front was that he demanded that the 7th Army be subordinated to the Zapfront. He was arrested against the agreement between Latsis and Rakovsky, against my statement that without the sanction of the Central Committee he would not be arrested. I did not receive any response from the Central Committee to my request. Meanwhile, Semashko is arrested.”

After 3 days, Trotsky again turned to Moscow:

“Semashko, who was arrested on the basis of the order of the Cheka, did not receive any answer to all his inquiries about the PBC member of the 12th Army. The arrest of Semashko causes the greatest bewilderment, and according to the situation - the indignation of all responsible workers, starting with Rakovsky. According to the established procedure, the PBC members cannot be arrested without the consent of the PBC. Was there such consent to whom it was given? ”

Trotsky not only wrested Semashko from the hands of the Chekists, but also insisted on his rehabilitation, which was notified to Moscow on August 15, 1919: “I consider not only acceptable, but also necessary, the return of Kutyrev and Semashko to the 12th army. I ask you to convey the following in writing to both: “Dear comrades Semashko and Kutyrev. I express extreme regret for the outrage committed by you. The arrest was made contrary to my prohibition and is the result of evil will and senseless confusion. With comradely greetings, Trotsky. ""

On August 4, in 1938, he was arrested in the Trotskyite case. He was released on June 16, 1941 due to the dismissal of the case (reference number 89 of the UNKVD in the Rostov Region dated 06.16.1941).

== Ranks ==
- corral (June 15, 1908);
- centurion (October 5, 1911);
- Poddesaul (September 11, 1915);
- Yesaul (1917).

Military offices
Preceded by Genrich Eiche	Commander of the 5th Army RSFSR; January 24 – February 3, 1920	Succeeded by Vilhelm Garf
