= Petro Havrylenko =

Ukrainian anarchist

- Петро Гавриленко
- Born: 1883; Huliaipole, Russian Empire
- Died: 25 November 1920 (aged 36–37); Melitopol, Ukrainian SSR
- Military career
- Allegiance: Makhnovshchina
- Service: Revolutionary Insurgent Army of Ukraine
- Service years: 1918–1920
- Conflicts: Ukrainian War of Independence: Battle of Peregonovka; Siege of Perekop

Petro Havrylenko (Ukrainian: Петро Гавриленко; 1883–1920) was a Ukrainian anarchist that acted as a commander and chief of staff in the Revolutionary Insurgent Army of Ukraine during the Ukrainian Civil War.

== Biography ==
Born into a peasant family, he joined the ranks of the anarchists during the 1905 Russian Revolution. During the First World War, he rose to the rank of a staff captain in the Imperial Russian Army, and for his service in the war he was awarded a Order of St. George. During the Ukrainian War of Independence, he was an active participant in the Makhnovist movement. In 1917, he joined Nestor Makhno's newly formed Black Hundred detachment, which was local to Huliaipole.

In the following years, after joining the Revolutionary Insurgent Army of Ukraine, he rose from company commander to commander of the 3rd Corps, and in autumn 1919 was elected to its Military Revolutionary Council. In early November 1919, he was elected assistant commander of the second group of infantry units of the 2nd and 3rd Corps, created to oust the troops of the Armed Forces of South Russia (AFSR) from the Huliaipole area. Commanding the 3rd Katerynoslav Corps, he played a significant role in the defeat of the AFSR. In January 1920, he was temporarily acting chief of staff of the Insurgent Army, and was arrested by the Soviet authorities, who imprisoned him in Kharkiv. After the defeat of Anton Denikin's forces, he was arrested again by Soviet forces, though he was soon released along with other Makhnovists.

After the conclusion of the agreement between the Black and Red armies, Havrylenko was released from the Cheka prisons. He was immediately sent to the Southern Front and appointed as chief of staff of the Insurgent Army under Semen Karetnyk. After their victory over the Russian Army at the siege of Perekop, the Insurgent detachment was ordered to be integrated into the 4th Army and transferred to the Caucasus. On 25 November 1920, Karetnyk and Havrylenko were summoned to a command meeting in Huliaipole, but they were ambushed en route and executed by the Cheka.

== Bibliography ==
- Malet, Michael (1982). Nestor Makhno in the Russian Civil War. London: Palgrave Macmillan. ISBN 978-0-333-25969-6. OCLC 8514426.
- Skirda, Alexandre (2004) [1982]. Nestor Makhno–Anarchy's Cossack: The Struggle for Free Soviets in the Ukraine 1917–1921. Translated by Sharkey, Paul. Oakland: AK Press. ISBN 978-1-902593-68-5. OCLC 60602979.
- Volkovinsky, Valery Nikolaevich (2004). "Гавриленко, Петро". In Smoliy, Valeriy (ed.). Encyclopedia of History of Ukraine. Vol. 2. Naukova Dumka. p. 10. ISBN 966-00-0405-2.
- Zarubin, A. G.; Zarubin, V. G. (2008). Без победителей. Из истории Гражданской войны в Крыму (in Russian) (1st ed.). Simferopol: Antiqua. pp. 708–728. ISBN 978-966-2930-47-4.
