= Vasyl Sharovsky =

Ukrainian anarcho-communist (1891–1938)

- Василь Михайлович Шаровський
- Born: 24 December 1891; Huliaipole, Oleksandrivsky, Katerynoslav, Russian Empire
- Died: 25 April 1938 (aged 46); Soviet Union
- Military career
- Allegiance: Russian Empire (1914-1917); Ukrainian People's Republic (1917-1918); Makhnovshchina (1918-1921)
- Service: Imperial Russian Army (1914-1917); Black Guards (1917-1918); Revolutionary Insurgent Army of Ukraine (1918-1921)
- Service years: 1914–1921
- Rank: Artillery Chief
- Known for: Artillery
- Conflicts: World War I; Ukrainian War of Independence

Vasyl Mikhailovych Sharovsky (24 December 1891 – 25 April 1938) was a member of the Central Council of Ukraine, an anarcho-communist and an artillery commander of the Revolutionary Insurgent Army of Ukraine.

== Biography ==
Vasyl Mikhailovych Sharovsky was born on 24 December 1891, in Huliaipole.

With the outbreak of World War I, he was called to the front. During his service, he received the title of senior fireworker. While serving in the army, he joined the Ukrainian Socialist-Revolutionary Party, then joined the Borotbists, before finally becoming an anarchist communist. In 1917, he was the head of the battery of the "Black Guards" organized in Huliaipole. In August 1917 he was elected a member of the Central Council of Ukraine from the All-Ukrainian Council of Peasant Deputies, a representative of the Oleksandrivsky Uyezd of the Yekaterinoslav Governorate. In April 1918, Sharovsky, together with a group of former officers of the Imperial Russian Army, organized and led a coup in Huliaipole against the authority of the council and were preparing to meet units of the Austro-Hungarian Army, Imperial German Army and the Ukrainian People's Army.

From January to June 1919, he was the head of artillery of the 3rd Zadneprovskaya brigade, under the command of Nestor Makhno. From September to December 1919, he was Assistant Chief of Artillery of the Revolutionary Insurgent Army of Ukraine (RIAU). From July 1920 to January 1921, he was the Chief of Artillery of the RIAU. In January 1921, in the Korsun region, Vasyl deserted from the RIAU units.

In 1930 he taught in Huliaipole. On 16 February 1938, he was arrested by a troika of the NKVD in the Dnipropetrovsk Oblast, accused of leading a "counter-revolutionary Anarcho-Makhnovist organization" and preparing an armed uprising. He was shot on 25 April 1938.

== Recognition ==
Sharovsky was mentioned in the Bolshevik newspaper Izvestia, on 6 April 1919:

Among the Makhnovists there are many insanely brave and talented people. Such, for example, are two artillerymen, Chuchko and Sharovsky, commanders of the batteries. Both front-line soldiers, who have not received any education, but are able to perfectly understand combat operations, they skillfully place the battery with inimitable composure and the ability to shoot from two shots at any target.

== Bibliography ==
- Belash, Alexander; Belash, Victor (1993). Дороги Нестора Махно (PDF) (in Russian). Kyiv: РВЦ "Проза". ISBN 9785770738148. OCLC 429142607.
- Danilov, Viktor; Shanin, Teodor (2006). Нестор Махно. Крестьянское движение на Украине. 1918—1921 (in Russian). ROSSPEN. ISBN 5824307695. OCLC 741204339.
- Malet, Michael (1982). Nestor Makhno in the Russian Civil War. London: Palgrave Macmillan. ISBN 978-0-333-25969-6. OCLC 8514426.
- Skirda, Alexandre (2004) [1982]. Nestor Makhno–Anarchy's Cossack: The Struggle for Free Soviets in the Ukraine 1917–1921. Translated by Sharkey, Paul. Oakland: AK Press. ISBN 978-1-902593-68-5. OCLC 60602979.
