= Ternovka, Rossoshansky District, Voronezh Oblast =

Ternovka Терновка
- Selo
- Location within Voronezh Oblast Location within Russia
- Coordinates: 50°07′N 39°50′E
- Country: Russia
- Region: Voronezh Oblast
- District: Rossoshansky District
- Time zone: UTC+3:00

Ternovka (Russian: Терновка) is a rural locality (a selo) in Starokalitvenskoye Rural Settlement, Rossoshansky District, Voronezh Oblast, Russia. The population was 557 as of 2010. There are 20 streets.

== Geography ==
Ternovka is located 23 km southeast of Rossosh (the district's administrative centre) by road. Loshchina is the nearest rural locality.
