= Ternovka, Kamyshinsky District, Volgograd Oblast =

Ternovka Терновка
- Selo
- Location within Volgograd Oblast Location within Russia
- Coordinates: 50°12′N 45°29′E
- Country: Russia
- Region: Volgograd Oblast
- District: Kamyshinsky District
- Time zone: UTC+4:00

Ternovka (Russian: Терновка) is a rural locality (a selo) and the administrative center of Ternovskoye Rural Settlement, Kamyshinsky District, Volgograd Oblast, Russia. The population was 983 as of 2010. There are 15 streets.

== Geography ==
Ternovka is located in forest steppe, on the Volga Upland, on the Ternovka River, 18 km northeast of Kamyshin (the district's administrative centre) by road. Verkhnyaya Lipovka is the nearest rural locality.
