= Ternovka, Belgorod Oblast =

Ternovka Терновка
- Selo
- Location within Belgorod Oblast Location within Russia
- Coordinates: 50°43′N 36°35′E
- Country: Russia
- Region: Belgorod Oblast
- District: Yakovlevsky District
- Time zone: UTC+3:00

Ternovka (Russian: Терновка) is a rural locality (a selo) and the administrative center of Ternovskoye Rural Settlement, Yakovlevsky District, Belgorod Oblast, Russia. The population was 1,340 as of 2010. There are 67 streets.

== Geography ==
Ternovka is located 12 km southeast of Stroitel (the district's administrative centre) by road. Shopino and Krasny Vostok are the nearest rural localities.
