= Vladimir Nesterovich =

Belarusian Soviet military commander and defector

- Born: 11 October 1895
- Died: 6 August 1925 (aged 29); Mainz, Germany
- Cause of death: Poisoned
- Military career
- Branch: Russian Army; Red Army
- Rank: Commander
- Conflicts: Russian Civil War

Vladimir Stepanovich Nesterovich (Belarusian: Уладзімір Сцяпанавіч Несцяровіч; 11 October 1895 – 6 August 1925) was a Soviet military commander and intelligence officer of the Russian Civil War. In 1925, he refused to return to the USSR and was subsequently poisoned by Soviet agents.

== Biography ==
He was born into a working-class Belarusian family. Before the war, he worked in the railway workshops at the Gomel station.

He joined the Russian Army in 1915 and served in World War I; he graduated from a military academy in 1916 and rose to the rank of shtabs-kapitan (staff captain) during the war. He became a member of the RSDLP(b) in 1917 and was elected to his regiment's soldiers' committee.

In 1918, he joined the Red Army (RKKA). From January to September 1918, he commanded the 1st Moscow Revolutionary Detachment; from September 1918 to June 1919, he commanded the 1st Moscow Revolutionary Regiment; and from June 1919 to February 1920, he commanded the 1st (also designated the 142nd) Brigade of the 42nd Rifle Division. While commanding the brigade, he fought against Denikin's Volunteer Army, including in the Voronezh-Kastornoye offensive (October–November 1919); for his actions in these battles, he was awarded the Order of the Red Banner (1920).

He was known for his personal bravery; for instance, V.A. Yevlanov and S.D. Petrov wrote:

During a clash with the enemy on October 4 near the village of Valova—when some units wavered under the enemy's fierce onslaught—Vladimir Stepanovich charged on a motorcycle into the enemy's skirmish line and, using heavy machine-gun fire against their flank, threw their ranks into disarray. He led his units in an attack that ended in success.

From February 18 to March 23 and from July 20 to September 1, 1920, he commanded the 42nd Rifle Division, participating in the Northern Taurida operation and fighting against Wrangel's forces. From September 1 to October 18, 1920, he commanded the 9th Cavalry Division.

On January 5, 1921, he was awarded an Honorary Revolutionary Weapon—a saber with a gilded hilt bearing the superimposed emblem of the Order of the Red Banner.

On January 15, 1921, a "Flying Corps" was formed—specifically to operate against Makhno's detachment—based on the Zavolzhskaya Separate Brigade; V.S. Nesterovich was appointed its commander. The corps consisted of 1,800 infantrymen ("bayonets"), 1,100 cavalrymen ("sabers"), 70 machine guns, and 12 artillery pieces. The Flying Corps relentlessly pursued Makhno's detachment for 24 days, covering 1,200 km and engaging in combat 11 times during that period. Nesterovich was unable to decisively defeat Makhno, but he inflicted heavy losses on his detachment. The Flying Corps also suffered significant casualties; on February 4, 1921, it was relieved by the 2nd Cavalry Division. The corps was disbanded shortly thereafter.

From February to April 1921, he once again commanded the 9th Cavalry Division, continuing the fight against the Makhnovists. He was unable to crush Makhno’s main forces, which swept across Ukraine with astonishing speed, covering incredible distances of two to three hundred kilometers in a single day... Nesterovich’s regular cavalry could not, of course, keep pace with these units, which were legendary for their swiftness. Yet, Nesterovich managed to cross Makhno’s path several times and defeat his top commanders—such as Ataman Shchus—and on one occasion in the Kharkov Governorate, he actually caught up with Makhno’s main force; only the resourcefulness of the Makhnovist headquarters saved them from total defeat. — G.Z. Besedovsky, On the Road to Thermidor

After the Civil War, he attended the advanced military courses at the Red Army Military Academy; upon graduating in 1922, he was appointed commander of the 31st Brigade of the 11th Gomel Cavalry Division, a post he held until August 1924. From August 1924 to April 1925, he was at the disposal of the Red Army’s Intelligence Directorate. He operated openly in Austria under the surname Yaroslavsky (using the operational alias "Ibrahim"), heading the Vienna intelligence center while simultaneously coordinating the activities of the Bulgarian Communist Party’s (BCP) military organization.

== Betrayal and Death ==
On April 16, 1925, a group of communists from the BCP’s military organization orchestrated an explosion at the St. Nedelya Church in Sofia. The terrorist attack killed 134 people instantly; another 79 later succumbed to their injuries, and approximately 500 people were wounded. Children were among the fatalities. Deeply shaken by the aftermath of the Sofia cathedral bombing, Nesterovich decided to sever ties with Soviet intelligence and deserted. Upon arriving in Berlin, he went to the French consul and offered certain information in exchange for a French passport and unhindered passage to France. Furthermore, fearing potential provocations from former colleagues, he requested—should the need arise—to be enlisted in the French Foreign Legion. After hearing Nesterovich out, the consul directed him to the city of Mainz, where units of the French occupation army were stationed; he was accommodated in their barracks while awaiting a final decision from the French authorities. However, shortly after his escape, the OGPU received a report stating that, while in Germany, he had made contact with British intelligence agents. This development deeply alarmed the Soviet leadership.

On July 24, 1925, at a meeting of the Balkan Commission of the Comintern Executive Committee and the Central Committee of the RCP(b) in Moscow, the following decision was adopted: "Verify all facts. If confirmed, take all measures to neutralize the subject. Ascertain the possibility of arrest by the Germans. Take measures to discredit him. Immediately dispatch Loganovsky to carry out the neutralization mission. Verify the existence of documents. Take measures to overhaul the apparatus and operations". Consequently, M. A. Trilisser, the head of the OGPU Foreign Department (INO), issued an order for the liquidation of Nesterovich.

On August 6, 1925, Nesterovich was poisoned in a Mainz café by two German communists—the Golke brothers—who had long worked under his command at the Vienna Center and were agents of the OGPU Foreign Department. The official explanation for his killing given was because he had been recruited by British agent Sidney Reilly in Moscow in 1918. Few believed this however, with fellow defector G.Z. Besedovsky writing Nesterovich was killed for attempting to leave the secret service, as well of his knowledge of Kremlin plans regarding Western Europe. The assassination of Nesterovich marked the first instance in the history of Soviet espionage of the elimination of an intelligence officer who had become a defector.

== Awards ==
- Honorary Revolutionary Weapon — January 5, 1921 (Order of the Revolutionary Military Council of the Republic No. 4)
- Order of the Red Banner — March 16, 1920 (Order of the Revolutionary Military Council of the Republic No. 132) — for distinguished service during combat operations from July to December 1919.
