= Donetsk Army =

Short lived Army during Soviet Civil war

The Donetsk Red Army was the field army of the short-lived Donets-Krivoy Rog Soviet Republic during the Russian Civil War. It existed between March 4 and April 15, 1918 and was formed to protect the Republic from the German-Austrian Army, which entered the territory of Ukraine at the invitation of the leadership of the Ukrainian People's Republic. It counted some 8,500 men.

== History ==
On February 27, the Donets-Krivoy Rog Soviet Republic decided to start the full mobilization of the Republic's military forces by releasing the decree "Revolution in Danger !". The central headquarters of the Red Guards of Donbass in Donetsk were renamed to the headquarters of the Red Army in the Donbass. Soon, the volunteer Donetsk miners and workers were joined by soldiers from the former Russian 8th Army of the Romanian front and Anatoliy Gekker became the commander of the Donetsk Red Army.

On March 16, 1918, the Council of People's Commissars issued a "Decree of hostilities", where it announced "the entry of the Republic into the South Russian military alliance in order to jointly fight against the German occupation". Initially, the Donetsk Army defended the north-Donetsk railway, and from the middle of April it defended the line between the village of Borova, the river Oskol, the river Donets and Yaremche. By the end of the month, it fought in skirmishes against German troops in the region of Lugansk-Rodakovo, together with the 5th Army of the Ukrainian People's Republic under the command of Kliment Voroshilov.

== Commanders ==
- Anatoliy Gekker (March 4 - April 6, 1918)
- Pyotr Baranov (since April 7)
- Aleksandr Krusser (since April 20)

== Sources ==
- Savchenko, V. A., Twelve Wars for Ukraine. Kharkov: Folio, 2006. ISBN 966-03-3456-7
- Civil War in Ukraine 1918-1920. A Collection of Documents and Materials in Three Volumes, Four Books. Kyiv, 1967.
- Antonov-Ovseenko, V. A., Notes on the Civil War
