= Grigori Maslakov =

Russian military leader

Grigory Savelievich Maslakov
- Григо́рий Саве́льевич Маслако́в
- Born: 1877; Stavropol Krai, Russia
- Died: 1921 (aged 43–44)
- Military career
- Allegiance: RSFSR (1918-1920); Makhnovshchina (1921)
- Branch: Red Army (1918-1920); Revolutionary Insurgent Army of Ukraine (1921)
- Service years: 1918–1921
- Nickname: Maslak
- Commands: 14th Maikop Cavalry Division; 4th Petrograd Cavalry Division
- Conflicts: Russian Civil War

Grigory Savelievich Maslakov, "Maslak" (1877–1921) was a Russian military leader during the Russian Civil War.

== Biography ==
Grigori Maslakov was born in 1877 to a poor family in the Stavropol Territory. Until the revolution, he lived in the Salsky District of the Don Cossack Region, whose territory is now part of Russia and Ukraine. Before World War I, he served as a patrolman for the horse breeder Korolkov, after he entered the service in the equestrian artillery, where he rose to the rank of sergeant.

=== On the side of the reds ===
In February 1918, Maslakov created a Red partisan detachment in the Salsky District, at the head of which he fought against the Don Army atamans P.Kh. Popov and P.N. Krasnova. In May of the same year, Maslakov's partisans joined Boris Dumenko's detachment. In the brigade formed, the former sergeant became the squadron commander, then commanded the 1st cavalry regiment. In March 1919, Maslakov, along with division chief Dumenko and brigade commander Budyonny, was awarded the Order of the Red Banner for military merits. All in all, Maslakov had two Orders of the Red Banner. Commanding the regiment, he won the sympathy of the Red Army men of the entire brigade. In June 1919, Maslakov was appointed commander of the 1st separate brigade of the 4th cavalry division for his skillful leadership of the regiment and for his "displayed energy in military affairs".

Maslakov also commanded 1 cavalry corps for a short time. In addition, Grigory Maslakov, with the participation of Boris Dumenko, became one of the founders of the 1st Cavalry Army. In early 1920, Grigory Maslakov assumed command of the 14th Maikop Cavalry Division and in the same year became a member of the Russian Communist Party (Bolshevik).

In November 1920, Maslakov took command of the 4th Petrograd Cavalry Division, but in December he was demoted to a brigade commander in the same division.

As part of the 4th division, Grigory Maslakov's brigade participated in the suppression of the rebels under the command of Nestor Makhno in the Yekaterinoslav Governorate.

=== Against the reds ===
For his refusal to carry out punitive actions against the rebels in early February 1921, a counter-revolution case was initiated against Maslakov with the aim of bringing him to trial by a revolutionary tribunal. To avoid punishment, Maslakov called on his brigade and the local population to oppose the Bolsheviks and support the rebels. On February 8, Maslakov managed to leave with part of the brigade to the Don, where he joined the Revolutionary Insurgent Army.

The rebels smashed the revolutionary committees. During this time, the number of Maslakov's brigade increased to 5 thousand people at the expense of the Don Cossacks and Sizov's detachment. On February 11, 1921, Maslakov was outlawed, since “on the basis of drunkenness and demagoguery,” he dragged a significant part of the soldiers of the 19th cavalry regiment into mutiny and “betrayed the cause of the revolution,” as the order said.

On March 10, 1921, Maslakov and Brova with their detachments, with the consent of Nestor Makhno, moved to the North Caucasus, receiving the name "Caucasian Insurgent Army of the Makhnovists". Hoping to convince the villagers from the 1st Cavalry Army under the command of Budyonny and the 2nd Cavalry Army under the command of Mironov to go over to the side of the rebels, Maslakov returned to the Stavropol Territory. In March, Maslakov fought his way to the northeast towards Tsaritsyn and Astrakhan.

The size of Maslakov's army fluctuated over the next 6 months from 1 to 4 thousand fighters and fought in Kalmykia. The first battles Maslakov's army fought in the Maloderbet ulus in March 1921 and in early April occupied Yashkul, Chilgir, Ulan Erge and Burgun-Sala, and on April 29, Maslakov's army occupied the city of Elista. Already in 1921, Maslakov's army was completely defeated by the Red Army. Maslakov and his comrade-in-arms Brova were killed by the amnestied members of the detachment.

== Image in literature ==
Grigori Maslakov appears under the nickname Maslak in the story "Afonka Bida" in the cycle of stories "Cavalry" (1923) by the Soviet writer Isaac Babel.

== Image in cinema ==
The brigade commander Maslakov appears in the 12th (final) episode of the series "Nine Lives of Nestor Makhno" (2007, director - Nikolai Kaptan).
