= Osypenko, Zaporizhzhia Oblast =

Osypenko Осипенко Новоспасівка Нейгофнунг
- Village
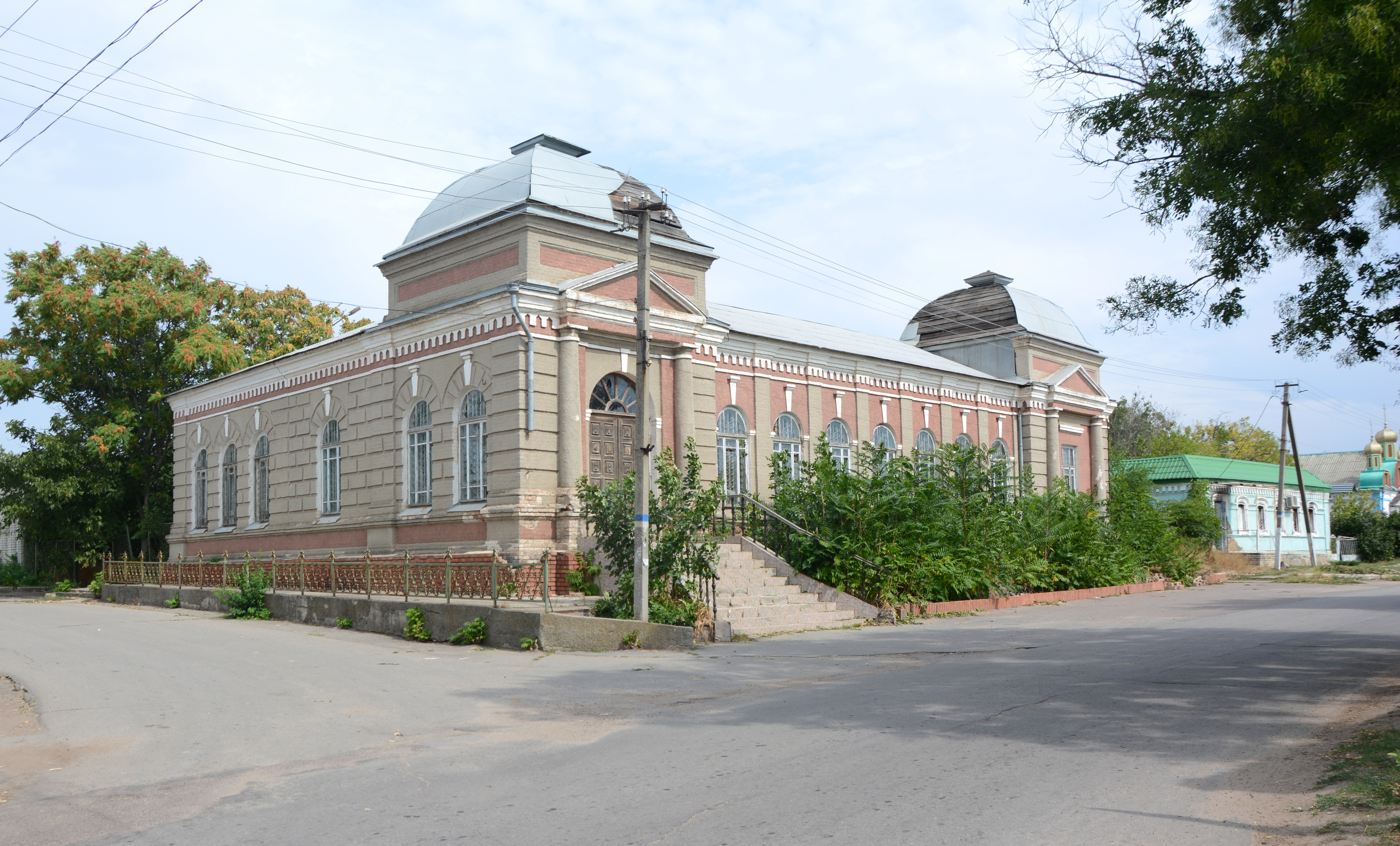

- Location within Zaporizhzhia Oblast Location within Ukraine
- Coordinates: 46°55′00″N 36°49′08″E
- Country: Ukraine
- Oblast: Zaporizhzhia
- Raion: Berdiansk
- Hromada: Osypenko rural hromada
- Founded: 1805

Population
  - Total: 4,667
- Website: Ukrainian Parliament website

Osypenko (Ukrainian: Осипенко) is a village (selo) in Berdiansk Raion, Zaporizhzhia Oblast, southern Ukraine. It is located on the left bank of the river Berda, and is the administrative center of Osypenko rural hromada.

== History ==
=== 19th century ===
The village was established as Novospasivka (Ukrainian: Новоспасівка) in the Russian Empire in 1805 by runaway serfs from Poltava Governorate. By the 1860s, Novospasivka had a population of 3,182 people.

=== 20th century ===
During the Russian Civil War, Novospasivka was the second-most (only behind Huliaipole) important center of the Ukrainian anarchist movement known as the Makhnovshchina. Novospasivka changed hands between the warring factions several times, before eventually falling into control of the Bolsheviks, who established the Soviet Union on much of the former territory of the Russian Empire. The Soviet government incorporated Novospasivka into Berdiansk Okruha of the Ukrainian Soviet Socialist Republic in 1923. In the same year, Novospasivka was designated the center of Novospasivka Raion within the okruha.

In 1925, the raion center was moved to Berdiansk, and it was renamed Berdiansk Raion accordingly. The raion, including Novospasivka, was also transferred to Mariupol Okruha that year. In 1932, the okruha system was scrapped altogether, and Novospasivka became part of Dnipropetrovsk Oblast. As a result of the Holodomor, a manmade famine in the Ukrainian SSR in 1932–1933, over 200 people from Novospasivka are documented to have died.

In 1939, Novospasivka became part of Zaporizhzhia Oblast, a newly created region split off from Dnipropetrovsk Oblast. In the same year, Novospasivka was renamed to Osypenko in honor of Soviet military pilot Polina Osipenko, who was born in the village. During World War II, Osypenko was occupied by Nazi Germany from October 6, 1941 to September 16, 1943.

In 1973, a ceramics factory was founded in Osypenko that produced building materials.

=== 21st century ===
In 2016, Osypenko and some neighboring villages became part of Osypenko rural hromada, one of the hromadas of Ukraine.

In late February 2022, at the beginning of the full-scale Russian invasion of Ukraine, Osypenko was occupied by the Russian military.

== Notable people ==
- Viktor Bilash (1893–1938), Ukrainian anarchist leader
- Vasyl Kurylenko (1890–1921), Ukrainian anarchist leader
- Polina Osipenko (1907–1939), Soviet military pilot
