= ROSSPEN =

Russian academic publisher

ROSSPEN or Political Encyclopedia Publishers (Russian: РОССПЭН, Издательство «Политическая энциклопедия») is a Russian academic publisher. It is a major publisher of archival materials and research works in history of Russia and the Soviet Union.

Its major works include the 100-volume series History of Stalinism ("История сталинизма") (shortlisted for the International Freedom to Publish Award, IPA) and the 119-volume "Библиотека отечественной общественной мысли с древнейших времен до начала XX века" (2010 "Book of the Year", Russia). There are over 100 other award-winning works published by ROSSPEN.
