= Battle of Peregonovka =

Battle in the Russian Civil War

- Part of the Ukrainian War of Independence and the Southern Front of the Russian Civil War
Date	26 September 1919
Location	Perehonivka, Kherson 48°32′01″N 30°31′24″E
Result	Makhnovists victory: Advance on Moscow halted
Territorial changes	Southern and Eastern Ukraine captured by the Makhnovshchina

Belligerents
Makhnovshchina	South Russia

Commanders and leaders
Nestor Makhno; Fedir Shchus	Yakov Slashchov; Nikolai Shilling; See full list: Nikolai Sklyarov; Vladimir Almendinger; Boris Gattenberger †

Units involved
Insurgent Army: 1st Donetsk Corps; 2nd Azov Corps	AFSR: Volunteer Army; Simferopol Officer Regiment; Lithuanian Battalion

Strength
6,000–8,000	12,000–15,000

Casualties and losses
Unknown est.	Total: 10,000 killed See full list: 6,000 killed by insurgents; 4,000 killed by peasants; up to 5,000 taken prisoner; 23 field guns and 100 machine guns captured

The Battle of Peregonovka (Russian: Битва под Перегоновкой) or Battle of Perehonivka (Ukrainian: Битва під Перегонівкою) was a September 1919 military conflict in which the Revolutionary Insurgent Army of Ukraine defeated the Volunteer Army. After retreating west across Ukraine for four months and 600 kilometers, the Insurgent Army turned east and surprised the Volunteer Army. The Insurgent Army reclaimed its capital of Huliaipole within ten days.

== Background ==
In mid-June 1919, Andrei Shkuro, the commander of the Kuban Cossacks, took advantage of the discord between the Bolsheviks and Ukrainian anarchists to raid the anarchist capital of Huliaipole, forcing the anarchists' Insurgent Army into a retreat towards right-bank Ukraine. The Insurgent Army fell back hundreds of kilometers to the west, eventually reaching Kherson, then under the control of the Otaman Nykyfor Hryhoriv. Their alliance with him did not last long, as the Insurgents assassinated him for his connections with the White movement and his participation in antisemitic pogroms. Strengthened by defectors from the Red Army, which had since fled Ukraine, the reconsolidated Insurgent Army launched a series of attacks behind the White lines.

The Volunteer Army commander Yakov Slashchov responded with his own offensive into the insurgents' rear, rescuing a White division that had been trapped at Novoukrainka, but a counter-attack forced them back to Pomichna, causing 300 White casualties and "sowing panic" within the White ranks. They resolved to attack the following day, causing the insurgents to retreat towards Uman and allowing the Whites to recover 400 POWs and three artillery cannons. The insurgents continued their retreat for two weeks, carrying with them 8,000 wounded and sick people, while engaging in daily skirmishes with the Whites. When they arrived at Uman, they found it in the hands of the Ukrainian People's Republic, who offered them neutral ground for their wounded to be treated on. While dug in outside of Uman, at the village of Peregonovka, the outnumbered, surrounded and ill-equipped Insurgent Army decided that they had retreated far enough and began to ready themselves for a counteroffensive.

== Battle ==
On 22 September, the Whites attacked the surrounded insurgents at Peregonovka, intending to finally annihilate them. The Insurgents surveyed their prospective battlefield: it was a hilled area, characterized by its deep ravines, bordered by the Syniukha river in the east and the Iatran river in the west, each of which were surrounded by dense forests and could only be crossed at the northern city of Novoarkhanhelsk or the southern village of Ternivka. The Insurgents thus deployed their units in the forests and claimed the high ground, east of Krutenkoe and Rogovo, where they prepared for the White assault.

Meanwhile, the Simferopol Officer Regiment advanced along the center line towards Peregonovka and Nikolai Sklyarov's units advanced along the right flank towards Uman, causing the two detachments to lose contact. Despite sustained bombardment by Insurgent artillery, the White advance over the subsequent days managed to drive the insurgents from the high ground, although poor coordination by the Whites left their flanks exposed, allowing the Insurgents to regain some ground by 25 September.

The following day, Sklyarov occupied Uman, opening up a wide gap between his units and those of the Simferopol Regiment, which now found itself isolated at Rogovo. The insurgent commander Nestor Makhno used the opportunity to regroup on the right-bank of the Iatran, positioning his forces opposite the weakened right flank of the Simferopol Regiment. Makhno gave his ill-equipped and exhausted troops a rousing speech, declaring that their 600-kilometer retreat was over and now "the real war was about to begin."

That evening, an insurgent brigade carried out a feint attack against the White positions at Krutenkoe, drawing the Whites westward after a light skirmish, allowing the Insurgent Army itself to move back east. In the early hours of the morning, the insurgents detonated some explosives to signal the beginning of their attack. The battle commenced at 03:00, with the Whites quickly gaining the upper hand and forcing the insurgents back to the outskirts of Peregonovka, where the insurgent staff readied their last stand at 09:00. The tide of the battle turned in the insurgents' favor when Makhno led his sotnia in a flanking maneuver against the White positions, charging the much larger enemy force with sabres and fighting them in close quarters combat, which forced the Whites into a retreat. Makhno then led the pursuit of the retreating Whites, decisively routing the enemy forces.

After insurgent infantry pushed the White's machine gun companies back into the forest near Konenkovato, they found themselves surrounded by insurgents and peppered by insurgent artillery fire. The Whites fell back to the Syniukha river, with one regiment going as far as Lysa Hora, abandoning the others to the insurgent assault. The White colonel Vladimir Almendinger reported that the retreat was constantly under attack by the insurgents, leading to a breakdown in the chain of command, with the Whites using what little ammunition they had remaining to repel the insurgent cavalry.

Harassed by the insurgent cavalry and running low on ammunition, the Whites retreated towards Ternivka but were unable to reach it. Having sustained heavy losses, some White units attempted a crossing of the Syniukha river at Burakivka under heavy fire, with some of their men drowning. In desperation, Almendinger's unit was forced to swim across the river and fall back to Novoukrainka, having sustained heavy losses, with barely 100 men remaining out of 6 companies. The final line of retreat was covered by a battalion of 60 men under the command of Boris Gattenberger, who shot himself after his men were all killed in a hail of insurgent machine gun fire and sabre charges.

== Aftermath ==
Map showing the full extent of Makhnovist territory in Ukraine, following the Battle of Peregonovka.

The White defeat at Peregonovka marked the turning point for the entire civil war, with a number of White officers remarking in that moment: "It's over." In the wake of the battle, the Insurgent Army split up in order to capitalize on their victory and capture as much territory as possible. In just over a week, the insurgents had occupied a vast territory in southern and eastern Ukraine, including the major cities of Kryvyi Rih, Yelysavethrad, Nikopol, Melitopol, Oleksandrivsk, Berdiansk, Mariupol and the insurgent capital of Huliaipole.

By 20 October, the insurgents had occupied the southern stronghold of Katerynoslav, taken full control of the regional rail network and blocked the Allied ports on the southern coast. As the Whites had now been cut off from their supply lines, the advance on Moscow was halted only 200 kilometers outside of the Russian capital, with the Cossack forces of Konstantin Mamontov and Andrei Shkuro being diverted back towards Ukraine. Mamontov's 25,000-strong detachment quickly forced the insurgents to fall back from the sea of Azov, relinquishing control of the port cities of Berdiansk and Mariupol. Nevertheless, the insurgents maintained control of the Dnieper and continued on to capture the cities of Pavlohrad, Synelnykove and Chaplyne.

In the historiography of the Russian Civil War, the Insurgent victory at Peregonovka has been attributed to the decisive defeat of Anton Denikin's forces and more broadly to the outcome of the war itself.

== Bibliography ==
- Avrich, Paul (1971) [1967]. The Russian Anarchists. Princeton: Princeton University Press. pp. 217–218. ISBN 0-691-00766-7. OCLC 1154930946.
- Darch, Colin (2020). Nestor Makhno and Rural Anarchism in Ukraine, 1917-1921. London: Pluto Press. pp. 72–90. ISBN 9781786805263. OCLC 1225942343.
- Footman, David (1961). "Makhno". Civil War in Russia. Praeger Publications in Russian History and World Communism. Vol. 114. New York: Praeger. pp. 276–277. LCCN 62-17560. OCLC 254495418.
- Malet, Michael (1982). Nestor Makhno in the Russian Civil War. London: Palgrave Macmillan. pp. 45–53. ISBN 978-0-333-25969-6. OCLC 8514426.
- Peters, Victor (1970). Nestor Makhno: The Life of an Anarchist. Winnipeg: Echo Books. OCLC 7925080.
- Shubin, Aleksandr (2010). "The Makhnovist Movement and the National Question in the Ukraine, 1917–1921". In Hirsch, Steven J.; van der Walt, Lucien (eds.). Anarchism and Syndicalism in the Colonial and Postcolonial World, 1870–1940. Studies in Global Social History. Vol. 6. Leiden: Brill. pp. 147–191. ISBN 9789004188495. OCLC 868808983.
- Skirda, Alexandre (2004) [1982]. Nestor Makhno–Anarchy's Cossack: The Struggle for Free Soviets in the Ukraine 1917–1921. Translated by Sharkey, Paul. Oakland: AK Press. pp. 124–138. ISBN 978-1-902593-68-5. OCLC 60602979.
