= Oleksiy Marchenko =

Ukrainian anarchist military leader

- Олексій Марченко
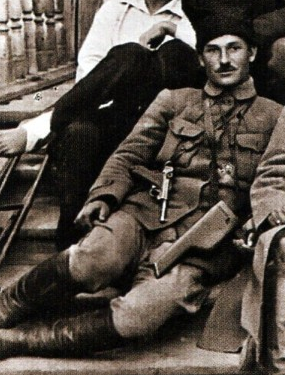
- Born: 1880s Huliaipole, Katerynoslav, Russian Empire
- Died: c. March 1921; Ukraine
- Military career
- Allegiance: Makhnovshchina
- Service: Revolutionary Insurgent Army of Ukraine
- Service years: 1918-1921
- Conflicts: Ukrainian War of Independence; Battle of Dibrivka; Battle for the Donbas; Northern Taurida Operation; Siege of Perekop

Oleksiy Ivanovych Marchenko (Ukrainian: Олексій Іванович Марченко; d. 1921) was a Ukrainian anarchist military leader, who fought in the war of independence as a cavalry commander in the Revolutionary Insurgent Army of Ukraine.

== Biography ==
Oleksiy Marchenko was born into a poor peasant family in Huliaipole. In 1907, he became an anarchist and developed his skills as a propagandist for the Union of Poor Peasants.

On 22 September 1918, Marchenko joined other members of the Huliaipole anarchist group in an insurrection against the occupation forces, aiming to retake their hometown. Led by Nestor Makhno, they ambushed the local Austrian garrison and briefly established control over the region. But an Austrian counterattack forced them to retreat north, towards the village of Dibrivka. Upon linking up with the local partisans led by Fedir Shchus, Marchenko participated in the insurgent counterattack against the Central Powers, culminating in the battle of Dibrivka. With their victory over the occupation forces, the insurrection spread throughout southern Ukraine and a subsequent campaign of reprisals was carried out by both sides.

On 15 November 1918, the insurgents were caught by a Hungarian surprise attack at Temyrivka. Marchenko lead his cavalry in an attempted counterattack, but his group suffered heavy losses and the insurgents were forced to fall back under heavy fire. Marchenko, along with Petya Lyuty and Petro Petrenko, managed to extricate the insurgents and their commander, Makhno, from the battle. Of 350 insurgents, only half survived. Despite the defeat, by 27 November, an insurgent counteroffensive had retaken Huliaipole, where Marchenko was inducted into the general staff of the newly consolidated insurgent forces.

By this time, the November Revolution had forced the occupation forces to withdraw from Ukraine, with the insurgents being left to fill the power vacuum in the south-east of the country, while the nationalist Directorate rose to power in left-bank Ukraine. With conflict against the nationalists on the horizon, the insurgents sought an alliance with the Bolsheviks, sending Marchenko to make contact with their local revolutionary committee at Nyzhnyodniprovske. A nationalist offensive into eastern Ukraine forced the insurgents into a retreat, moving from Huliaipole to Synelnykove, before arriving at Nyzhnyodniprovske on 25 December. Upon linking up with Makhno, Marchenko informed the insurgents of the latest information about the front. He suggest the formation of a combined front with the Bolsheviks, in order to briefly take Katerynoslav and seize its weapons before enemy reinforcements could arrive. With this in mind, the combined Soviet forces were able to capture the city by 28 December, but were forced to retreat the following day by a nationalist counteroffensive. On 3 January, Marchenko was formally elected to the insurgent general staff, serving under Viktor Bilash as chief of staff.

Following the Soviet invasion of Ukraine, the insurgents decided to enter into an alliance with the Bolsheviks. Despite the integration, tensions between the two factions heightened over time, culminating with the insurgents being declared outlaws by the Bolshevik government in June 1919. The advance of the Armed Forces of South Russia subsequently forced the insurgents to retreat west to Kherson. Marchenko accompanied his comrades from the Huliaipole anarchist group in the retreat, as part of a roughly 100-strong cavalry detachment. In Kherson, the insurgents reconstituted themselves and defeated the Volunteer Army at the Battle of Peregonovka, allowing them to capture most of southern Ukraine and halting the White advance on Moscow.

The Red Army swiftly returned to Ukraine and immediately entered into a conflict with the insurgents, but before long a renewed offensive by the White movement began to make another alliance seem necessary. In contrast to his earlier position, when another alliance with the Bolsheviks was proposed at an insurgent staff meeting on 23 June 1920, Marchenko spoke out against it, declaring that the Bolsheviks only sought to use the insurgents. Nevertheless, by October 1920, the proposed alliance had been ratified and the insurgents launched another counteroffensive, moving once again on Huliaipole. Under the command of Petro Petrenko and aided by information about the White positions, on 22 October, Marchenko's cavalry attacked the White Drozdov Division at Huliaipole, breaking the White lines and capturing 4,000 prisoners of war.

While Makhno remained back in Huliaipole, Semen Karetnyk was charged with leading the remainder of the insurgent offensive against the Russian Army. With Marchenko commanding the cavalry division within Karetnyk's detachment, by November 1920, the insurgents had reached Crimea, finally pushing the Whites out of mainland Ukraine.

On 7 November, a receding tide allowed some Red units to cross the Syvash, upon which the managed to take the northern part of the Lithuanian Peninsula. A change in wind initially prevented the insurgents from making the crossing, but after a number of Red cavalry divisions crossed the next morning, at 04:00, the insurgents were ordered by Mikhail Frunze to follow. On 9 November, at 05:00, Marchenko's cavalry crossed the Syvash, followed by a machine gun regiment commanded by Foma Kozhyn, sustaining many casualties under the heavy fire. The insurgent assault established a solid bridgehead, which allowed further Red units to cross and attack the White positions in the rear. When Kuban Cossacks led by Ivan Barbovich attacked the 15th Division's left flank, Marchenko's cavalry division counterattacked, dispersing at the last moment and leaving the Kuban Cossacks in the line of fire of Kozhyn's tachankas, decisively swinging the tide of battle in the Soviet favour. By 14 November 1920, Karetnyk's detachment had occupied Simferopol and a number of other Crimean cities, forcing the Government of South Russia to evacuate and resulting in the establishment of the Crimean Autonomous Soviet Socialist Republic.

With the Soviet occupation of Crimea secured, the Bolsheviks once again turned on their insurgent allies. On 27 November, the Red Army launched a surprise attack against the insurgent forces, ambushing and killing Karetnyk. Marchenko's cavalry division managed to break out of their encirclement and, on 29 November, broke the Red Army lines at Perekop and crossed over into northern Taurida. On 1 December, they engaged the 1st Cavalry Army in battle at Tymoshivka, with only about 250 of Marchenko's cavalry managing to escape. On 7 December, Marchenko arrived at Kermenchik, where he reunited with Makhno's own detachment, which itself had been ambushed at Huliaipole. After announcing the Crimean Insurgent Army's return, Marchenko informed Makhno of Karetnyk's fate and denounced the Bolsheviks.

The insurgents subsequently engaged in months of guerrilla warfare against the Bolsheviks, but to no avail. In early 1921, Marchenko was killed in a firefight with the Red Army and the remains of the Makhnovshchina fled the country not long after.

== Bibliography ==
- Darch, Colin (2020). Nestor Makhno and Rural Anarchism in Ukraine, 1917–1921. London: Pluto Press. ISBN 978-0-7453-3888-0.
- Malet, Michael (1982). Nestor Makhno in the Russian Civil War. London: Palgrave Macmillan. pp. 45–53. ISBN 978-0-333-25969-6. OCLC 8514426.
- Skirda, Alexandre (2004) [1982]. Nestor Makhno: Anarchy's Cossack. Translated by Sharkey, Paul. Edinburgh: AK Press. ISBN 1-902593-68-5. OCLC 58872511.
