= Petya Lyuty =

- Петя Лютий
- Born: Isidor Lyuty; Huliaipole, Karetynoslav, Russian Empire
- Died: 18 September 1919; Pomichna, Kherson, South Russia
- Military career
- Allegiance: Makhnovshchina
- Service: Revolutionary Insurgent Army of Ukraine
- Service years: 1918–1919
- Conflicts: Ukrainian War of Independence; Battle of Dibrivka; Battle for the Donbas

Isidor Lyuty (Ukrainian: Ісидор Лютий, d. 1919), better known by his nom de guerre Petya Lyuty (Ukrainian: Петя Лютий), was a Ukrainian military commander in the Revolutionary Insurgent Army of Ukraine. An early member of the insurgent staff, he also served as Nestor Makhno's personal bodyguard, before dying in battle against the White Army at Pomichna.

== Biography ==
Petya Lyuty worked as a painter and decorator. Following the outbreak of the Ukrainian War of Independence against the occupying Central Powers, Lyuty joined the insurgent detachment under Nestor Makhno, who he served as his personal bodyguard. Disguised as women, Lyuty and Makhno carried out reconnaissance on the local Austro-German headquarters in Huliaipole, but they called off their planned bombing attack against it, as they feared that they would harm the women and children inside.

On 22 September 1918, Makhno and Lyuty moved to decisively reoccupy Huliaipole, setting off from Ternivka in disguise as officers of the Ukrainian Armed Forces (UAF). Along the way, they encountered a real detachment of the UAF, from whom they received intelligence on the positions and strength of the Austro-German forces, before killing them. On 30 September 1918, Lyuty took a commanding role in the battle of Dibrivka, where the insurgents successfully defeated the local Austrian garrison. This was followed by a series of reprisals, with the Austrian forces eventually driving the insurgents out of Dibrivka.

On 15 November 1918, the insurgents were ambushed by a Hungarian detachment at Temyrivka, with half of them being killed in the attack. During the scrambled insurgent defense, Makhno fired a Lewis gun from Lyuty's own shoulder, killing enough men to stop the attack. But after a failed counterattack, the insurgents fell back, pinned down by gunfire. Lyuty, along with Oleksiy Marchenko and Petro Petrenko, rescued a wounded Makhno from the battle and escaped on horseback.

Nevertheless, the insurgents were able to rally themselves, finally recapturing Huliaipole on 27 November. This accelerated a process of reorganisation of the insurgent forces, which were now surrounded on all fronts by different enemies. At an extraordinary insurgent conference, the various insurgent detachments federated together under a central command, with Lyuty being elected to the insurgent staff.

After Makhno broke with the Bolsheviks and retreated from Huliaipole in the summer of 1919, Lyuty joined the insurgent detachment on its way towards Kherson. In early September, the insurgents fell into a series of clashes with the White Army around Pomichna, during which Petya Lyuty was killed.

== Bibliography ==
- Malet, Michael (1982). Nestor Makhno in the Russian Civil War. London: Palgrave Macmillan. ISBN 978-0-333-25969-6. OCLC 8514426.
- Skirda, Alexandre (2004) [1982]. Nestor Makhno–Anarchy's Cossack: The Struggle for Free Soviets in the Ukraine 1917–1921. Translated by Sharkey, Paul. Oakland: AK Press. ISBN 978-1-902593-68-5. OCLC 60602979.
