= Petro Petrenko =

Ukrainian military commander (1890–1921)

- Петро Петренко
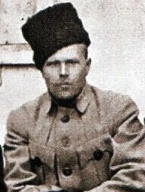
- Born: 1890; Velykomykhailivka, Pokrovske, Katerynoslav, Russian Empire
- Died: 26 August 1921 (aged 30–31); Kherson, Ukraine
- Other name: Petro Platonov
- Military career
- Allegiance: Russian Empire (1914–1917); Makhnovshchina (1918–1921)
- Service: Imperial Russian Army (1914–1917); Revolutionary Insurgent Army of Ukraine (1918–1921)
- Service years: 1914–1921
- Nickname: Petro Blyskavka
- Conflicts: World War I; Ukrainian War of Independence; Battle of Dibrivka; Northern Taurida Operation

Petro Petrenko (Ukrainian: Петро Петренко; 1890 – 26 August 1921) was a Ukrainian military commander in the Revolutionary Insurgent Army of Ukraine.

== Biography ==
In 1890, Petro Petrenko was born in the village of Velykomykhailivka. With the outbreak of World War I, he was called to the front, where he rose to the rank of ensign. In the wake of the 1917 Revolution, Petrenko returned to his home town and joined the local anarchist group, with which he took an active part in the uprising against the Ukrainian State.

On 30 September 1918, Petrenko joined up with the insurgent forces of Nestor Makhno and participated in the battle of Dibrivka, during which the insurgents defeated the forces of the Austro-Hungarian Army and captured Petrenko's home town. The insurgent victory was followed by a fierce campaign of reprisals, by both the occupation forces and the insurgents. On 15 November 1918, the insurgents were ambushed by a Hungarian detachment at Temyrivka and sustained heavy casualties. Makhno himself was only narrowly saved by Petrenko, who led the insurgent retreat, along with Petya Lyuty and Oleksiy Marchenko. The defeat marked the catalyst for the reorganisation of the insurgent forces and the consolidation of several fronts against their enemies.

Petrenko himself was assigned command of the front from Chaplyne to Hryshyne, as part of a federative organisation of the insurgent forces under the central command of Makhno. With Petrenko stationed at Hryhshyne, the Makhnovshchina soon became the predominant force in the province of Katerynoslav. Around this time, the Central Powers were beginning to withdraw from Ukraine, leaving a power vacuum behind that was filled by several competing factions, including the Ukrainian nationalists, the Bolsheviks and the White movement. Surrounded on all sides by different enemies, Petrenko himself was assigned command of the northern front against the Ukrainian People's Army and quickly came to lead about 10,000 partisans of varying left-wing political affiliations. During his time as commander, Petrenko reported a lack of discipline among the insurgent rank-and-file, complaining of hours-long delays in following orders.

Following the integration of the insurgent forces into the 1st Zadneprovsk Ukrainian Soviet Division, Petrenko served as chief of staff for the Bolshevik division commander Pavel Dybenko. But by April 1919, he had already come into direct conflict with his command, when the Third Regional Congress was proscribed by Dybenko himself. As a member of the Military Revolutionary Council, Petrenko signed a response to Dybenko that explained the context of the Congress, refusing his proscription and vowing to continue holding Congresses in the future.

During the Northern Taurida Operation, Petrenko participated in the insurgent capture of Huliaipole from the Whites. On 17 October, Petrenko led a mixed detachment of infantry, machine guns and artillery in an attack against the Drozdov Division, routing them and retaking the insurgent capital. Following the defeat of the White movement at the siege of Perekop, the Bolsheviks turned on their insurgent allies and attacked Makhnovshchina. The insurgents were forced to adapt to guerrilla warfare against the Red Army, with Makhno himself taking Petrenko under his wing and teaching him their new strategy.

In March 1921, the insurgents split their forces up, as they were facing increasing pressure by the Red Army. During this period of guerrilla warfare, Petrenko himself acted as commander of the main insurgent detachment. Following a series of defeats, on 12 March, Petrenko led his 1,500-strong cavalry detachment and two infantry regiments in the defense against the Red assaults, routing a number of Red units and capturing their equipment. But, on 14 March, their counterattack was defeated and they were again forced to split up, with sporadic fighting taking place over the subsequent months.

By the summer of 1921, the insurgents had almost been wiped out. A small core around Makhno made the decision to flee into exile and began their retreat towards the border, under constant attack by the Red Army. On 26 August 1921, Petrenko was killed in battle with a red cavalry division in Kherson province. Two days later, the remnants of the insurgent detachment crossed into Romania, where they began their life in exile.

== Bibliography ==
- Darch, Colin (2020). Nestor Makhno and Rural Anarchism in Ukraine, 1917–1921. London: Pluto Press. ISBN 978-0-7453-3888-0.
- Malet, Michael (1982). Nestor Makhno in the Russian Civil War. London: Palgrave Macmillan. ISBN 978-0-333-25969-6. OCLC 8514426.
- Skirda, Alexandre (2004) [1982]. Nestor Makhno: Anarchy's Cossack. Translated by Sharkey, Paul. Edinburgh: AK Press. ISBN 1-902593-68-5. OCLC 58872511.
