= Revolutionary Insurgent Army of Ukraine =

Anarchist army of Ukrainian peasants and workers (1918–21)

- Революційна Повстанська Армія України
- A flag used by the 2nd Consolidated Infantry Regiment of the RIAU; Inscription in Russian: "2nd Consolidated Infantry Regiment of the Insurrectionary Army of Ukraine, Makhnovists"
- Leaders: Nestor Makhno; Semen Karetnyk; Fedir Shchus; Viktor Bilash
- Dates active: 1918–1921
- Allegiance: Makhnovshchina
- Headquarters: Huliaipole
- Active regions: Southeastern Ukraine
- Ideology: Anarcho-communism
- Political position: Far-left
- Size: 103,000 in December 1919

The Revolutionary Insurgent Army of Ukraine (Ukrainian: Революційна Повстанська Армія України, РПАУ, romanized: Revoliutsiina Povstanska Armiia Ukrainy, RPAU; abbr. RIAU), also known as Makhnovtsi (Махновці), named after their founder Nestor Makhno, was an anarchist army formed largely of Ukrainian peasants and workers during the Russian Civil War. They protected the operation of "free soviets" and libertarian communes by the Makhnovshchina, an attempt to form a stateless and anarcho-communist society from 1918 to 1921 during the Ukrainian War of Independence.

== Terminology ==
"Revolutionary Insurgent Army of Ukraine" is the common translation of the Революційна Повстанська Армія України, Revoliutsiina Povstanska Armiia Ukrainy. It is commonly contracted to "Insurgent Army", or "Revolutionary Insurgent Army". This term has less commonly been translated as "Revolutionary Insurrectionary Army of Ukraine" or "Revolutionary Partisan Army of Ukraine", with their own respective contractions "Insurrectionary Army" and "Partisan Army". The Russian Bolshevik politician Victor Serge himself referred to it as the "Black Army", in his later works about the conflict. Members of the army are generically referred to as "insurgents"; they have also been labelled "Makhnovists" or "Makhnovites" (from the Ukrainian: Махновці, romanized: Makhnovtsi), after their commander Nestor Makhno.

== History ==
=== Background ===
Insurrectionary anarchism first spread throughout Ukraine during the 1905 Russian Revolution, with organizations such as the Black Banner launching a terrorist campaign against the Tsarist autocracy. In the small town of Huliaipole, a young Nestor Makhno joined the Union of Poor Peasants, which carried out "expropriations" against wealthy locals, before much of the group was arrested and imprisoned for their activities. Following the February Revolution of 1917, Makhno was released and returned to his hometown, where he began to organize the local peasantry. With the outbreak of the Kornilov affair threatening the gains of the revolution, Makhno established a revolutionary defense committee that set about "disarming the entire local bourgeoisie and abolishing its rights over the people's assets", resulting in the establishment of numerous agrarian communes. On 10 September [O.S. 27 August], the Ukrainian anarchist Maria Nikiforova responded to the attempted coup by leading a 200-strong detachment from Huliaipole, armed with only 10 rifles and a few revolvers, to disarm a Russian Army regiment in Orikhiv, capturing the town and seizing the regiment's weapons.

The seizure of power by the Bolsheviks during the October Revolution ignited a civil war, as counterrevolutionaries such as the Don Cossacks and Ukrainian nationalists rose up against the new government. Anarchists in Oleksandrivsk, led by Nikiforova, responded by establishing a revolutionary committee (revkom) to combat the counterrevolution. When the Central Council of Ukraine seized control of Oleksandrivsk from the revkom, the city's Bolsheviks and Left Socialist-Revolutionaries appealed for support from the anarchists of Huliaipole. The town's poor peasants and anarchists resolved to intervene in the conflict, dispatching an 800-strong detachment, led by Savelii Makhno, towards Oleksandrivsk in order to join up with the Red Guards and fight against the forces of the Central Council. Meanwhile, back in Huliaipole, Nestor Makhno led the local resistance to the Don Cossacks, successfully defeating and disarming them, before sending them home. Nestor also freed the imprisoned local workers and expropriated 250,000 rubles from the bank, in order to fund the activities of the local soviet.

The Central Powers responded to the outbreak of civil war by invading Ukraine in February 1918, forcing the Bolshevik government to cede control of Ukraine in exchange for the formal recognition of the Russian Soviet Federative Socialist Republic in the Treaty of Brest-Litovsk. Ukrainian revolutionaries were either forcibly disarmed or evacuated to Russia, where the Red Guards also disarmed them. In an attempt to resist the invasion, Nestor Makhno formed a 1,500-strong volunteer detachment and made for Oleksandrivsk. But in their absence, Huliaipole was occupied by German troops, with the assistance of local Ukrainian nationalists. The anarchist detachment retreated to Taganrog where they held a conference, deciding that some would tour Russia to rally support, while others would remain behind to build a clandestine revolutionary organization. The conference set July 1918 as the date to regroup, upon which they would return to Huliaipole and ignite an uprising against the occupying forces.

By the time the anarchist forces returned to Ukraine, the country had been brought completely under the control of the Central Powers, which deposed the Central Council and replaced it with a new Ukrainian State, restoring the rights of the nobility and carrying out a White Terror against libertarian activists. Following Makhno's return to the region, the first Makhnovist detachment was established in Voskresenske and began to carry out raids against enemy positions. Makhno himself formed a peasant detachment in Ternivka, but before long returned to Huliaipole while disguised as a woman, in order to carry out attacks against the occupation forces.

=== Foundation of the Insurgent Army ===
On 22 September 1918, the Huliaipole anarchist group around Nestor Makhno and Semen Karetnyk began to make moves to decisively reoccupy their hometown. Disguised as a detachment of the National Guard, they were able to disarm and attack unwitting units of the Ukrainian State, a tactic which they made frequent use of. Aided by their disguises, they were able to reach Huliaipole within a few days, narrowly avoiding the local German occupation forces. They continued on to Marfopol, where they encountered forces of the Austro-Hungarian Army and led a feigned retreat into the fields, upon which they cut down the Austrian detachment with machine gun fire. Afterwards, the anarchists executed the local police chief and passed out propaganda to the conscripted troops, urging them to mutiny and launch revolutions of their own back home, before releasing them in different directions.

While the occupation forces were busy pacifying Marfopol, the anarchists finally returned to Huliaipole and scattered throughout the region, raising the local peasantry to revolt. They held an assembly with 400 participants, which discussed the ignition of an insurrection and how it would be carried out, quickly working out a program of action. Within a day, the insurgent forces had taken control of the region without any bloodshed, briefly returning local infrastructure to workers' control and re-establishing "the power of the soviets", before declaring a general insurrection throughout Ukraine to overthrow the Hetmanate and oust the occupation forces. However, on 29 September, the Central Powers launched a counterattack, forcing the anarchists to evacuate the town and retreat to Mariupol in order to avoid encirclement and subsequent reprisals. On the way to Mariupol, the insurgents were able to disarm more Hetmanate units and seize their equipment for themselves, before linking up with the 60-strong insurgent force led by the anarchist sailor Fedir Shchus, who had been waging guerrilla warfare against the occupation since the Taganrog conference. The two forces resolved to join, so that they could successfully conduct open warfare against not only the Central Powers but also against the invading White movement. This rallying cry eventually resulted in the insurgents pulling together 1,500 volunteers, although only one-quarter were armed.

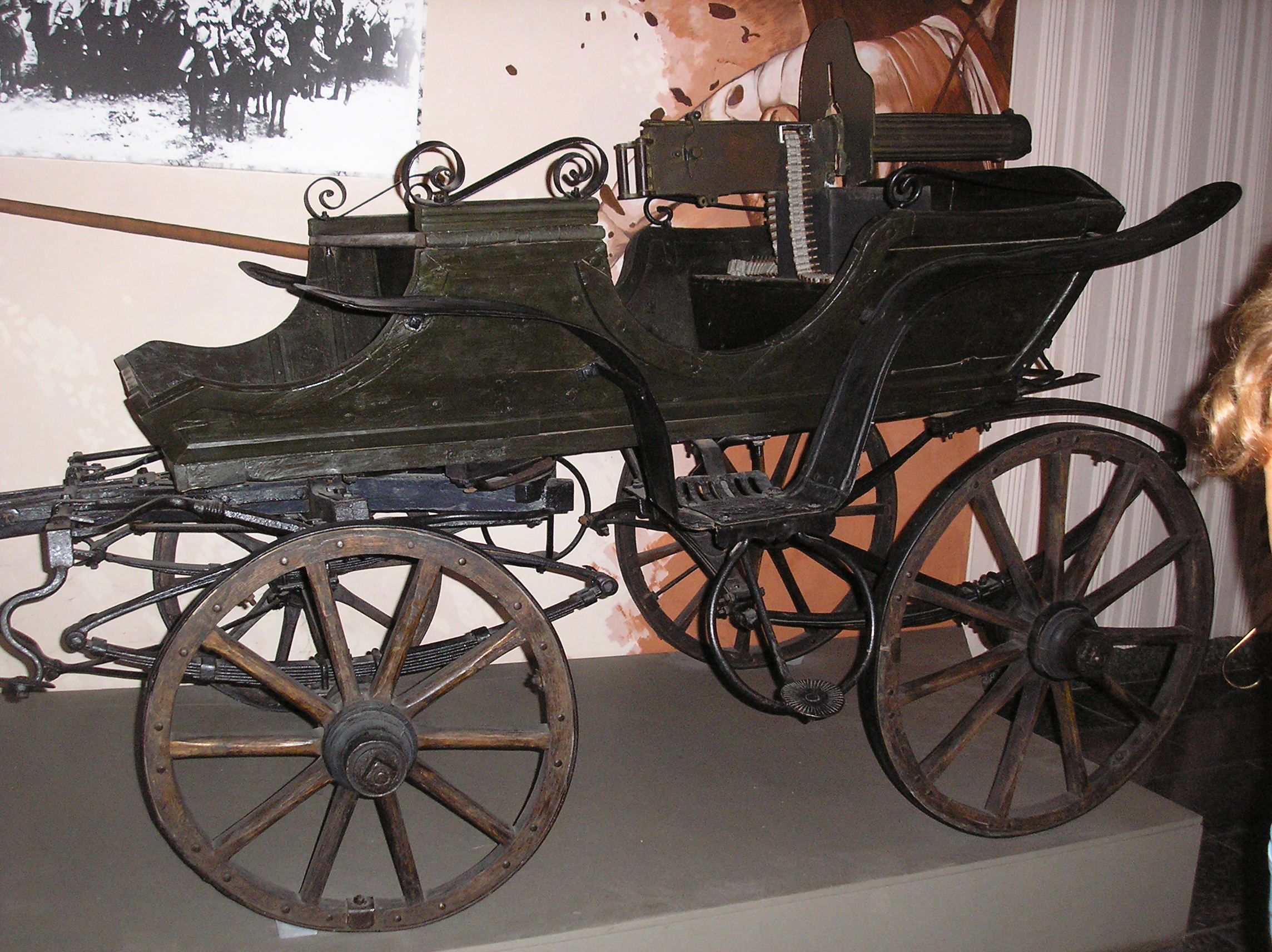
A tachanka used by soldiers of the Insurgent Army, on display in a museum in Huliaipole.

The insurgents were ambushed in Dibrivka, cutting off their route of retreat, but the Makhnovists managed to maintain their access to the forest through a series of flanking maneuvers. In the face of overwhelming odds, Makhno managed to rouse the insurgents to attack the superior enemy force. Thus, on the night of 30 September, a 30-strong insurgent detachment split into two groups - one led by Shchus and armed with a Maxim gun, the other led by Makhno and armed with a Lewis gun. They faced a well-armed force led by 500-strong Austrian battalion, and supported by 100 Ukrainian soldiers and 80 National Guardsmen, in total outnumbering the insurgents by over 20 times. In a surprise attack, the two small insurgent bands positioned themselves on either side of the enemy camp and opened fire on the unarmed troops, forcing them into a panicked retreat, pursued by local peasants armed only with farming tools. After the battle was over, they had captured four machine guns and two munitions vehicles, along with 80 enemy prisoners of war. With their officers having apparently abandoned them to the insurgents, the captured Ukrainian troops were shot, while the remaining Austrian soldiers were fed and released with some provisions, stripped of their kepis (symbolically demilitarizing them). For his military prowess during the battle, Nestor Makhno reluctantly accepted the honorific title of Bat'ko ("father") from the victorious insurgents.

The insurgents subsequently carried out a series of attacks against the Germans and their Ukrainian collaborators, with Makhno and Shchus infiltrating a White Russian meeting on a landowner's estate and blowing up their hosts with a bomb. This was likewise met with reprisals from the occupying forces, which led a counterattack against Dibrivka, burning down hundreds of houses in the village and attacking the local peasantry. The insurgents likewise carried out reprisals against German settlers that had collaborated with the occupation forces, burning down a number of kulak farms, although Makhno ordered that peaceful Germans be spared and even compensated for property damage. Over the following weeks, many insurgent bands began to rise up throughout the region, attacking the occupation forces and collaborators. It was at this point that the insurgents began to characterize their fight as being against landowners and kulaks, as well as the foreign occupation forces, which increased the insurgents' standing with their poor peasant base. The insurgents started to establish "people's courts" to deal with prisoners of war, setting a precedent for releasing enlisted soldiers, while shooting the officers and collaborators.

When insurgent forces occupied a village, they would set up guard posts on all sides to ensure they wouldn't be hit with surprise attacks and could retreat if necessary. They would also lay false trails to mislead the enemy on their direction of travel, frequently diverting course and moving at night in areas they knew well. On 15 November, an Austro-Hungarian attack against the village of Temirivka was aided by a local kulak, who had mistakenly been allowed passage by Makhno himself. The insurgents managed to halt the attack with machine gun fire, but following a failed cavalry charge, they were forced to fall back, pinned down by enemy sniper fire. Despite insurgent attempts to break the attack, Austro-Hungarian reinforcements forced the insurgents to retreat, having lost half of their 350-strong force, with Makhno, Shchus and Karetnyk all being wounded. Despite the defeat, the insurgents continued their sustained attacks against German colonists and Ukrainian landowners, eventually clearing the whole region around Huliaipole of the occupation and collaborationist forces. By the end of 1918, the entirety of Eastern Ukraine was experiencing revolts against the Central Powers, growing to such an extent that the German high command in Alexandrovsk even conceded to insurgent demands of amnesty for their prisoners of war.

At a regional insurgent conference, Makhno proposed that they open up a war on four fronts: simultaneously against the Hetmanate, Central Powers, Don Cossacks and White movement. It was decided to reorganize the insurgent forces into a unified army, using a federal model, with mixed battalions composed of cavalry, infantry, tachanki and artillery sections. With the consent of their forces, the commanders on each of the four fronts were given discretion to introduce military discipline into their ranks and would answer directly to Bat'ko Makhno as commander-in-chief. An intelligence service made up of volunteer women was also established, tasked with keeping track of enemy movements and reporting them to central command. The insurgent high command, which included Shchus and Karetnyk alongside Makhno, was almost wiped out not long after it was constituted, being encircled by occupation forces at Synelnykove and only narrowly saved by reinforcements. Another near-miss came on 20 November, when Makhno's ill-prepared detachment was attacked by a White Russian armored train, killing a number of his most experienced fighters and even resulting in rumours spreading throughout Ukraine of Makhno's death.

By this time, the Central Powers had been forced to sign an armistice, bringing World War I to an end and resulting in the end of their occupation in Ukraine. Symon Petliura had also led a coup in Kyiv which ousted Pavlo Skoropadskyi from power, reconstituting the Ukrainian People's Republic with the Directorate as its government. The new government granted amnesty to all political prisoners, allowing Savelii Makhno and Alexander Kalashnikov to return home to Huliaipole, but the shaky truce between the insurgents and the government began to weaken, as the Petliurists looked to form an alliance with the White movement under Anton Denikin. The anarchist insurgent movement itself, which had only two months ago consisted of a small detachment in Ternovka, was now a tightly organized and battle-hardened fighting force: the Revolutionary Insurgent Army of Ukraine.

=== Intensification of the conflict ===
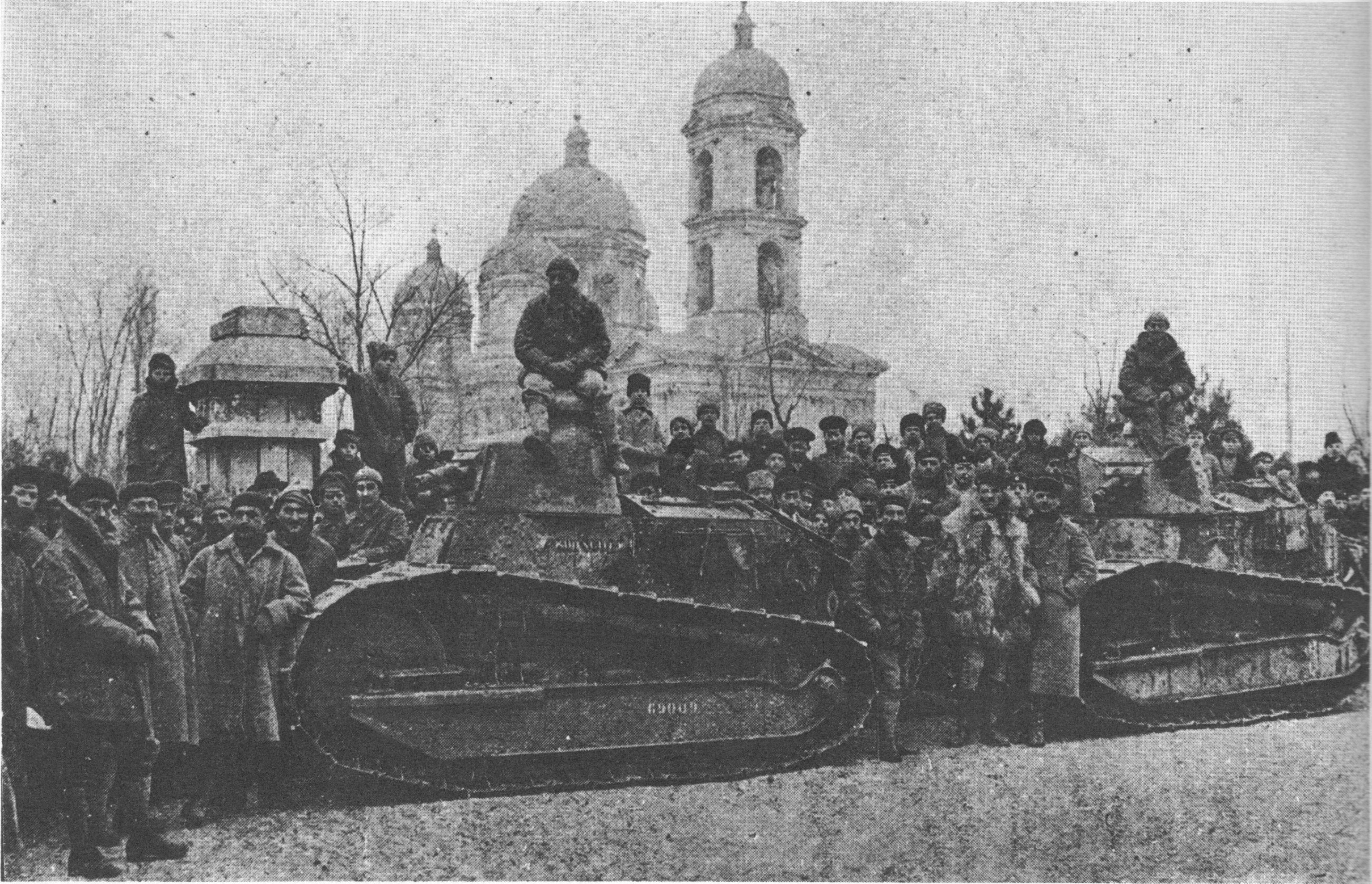
French soldiers, mixed with civilians and White Army soldiers, during the Allied intervention in 1919.

With the Central Powers having pulled out of Ukraine, in December 1918, the Allies led an intervention on the side of Anton Denikin's White movement, with 50,000 Allied troops landing at Odesa and being deployed throughout Southern Ukraine. The Ukrainian People's Republic controlled most of the remainder of Ukraine, but their forces were poorly equipped and isolated, opposed by the Allies, White and Red Russians alike. Caught between the Whites and the nationalists, the Makhnovists themselves had managed to capture a large amount of territory in Zaporizhzhia and Pryazovia. With the support of the local peasantry, their ranks were buffered by thousands of local insurgents, but they remained sorely lacking in arms and ammunition.

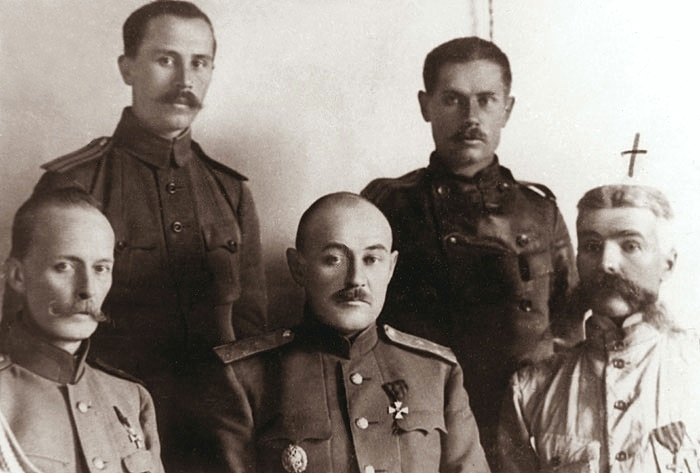
Commanders of the Don Army.

The Insurgent Army was largely occupied on the front in Donbas, where they were engaged in skirmishes with the Cossacks of the Don Republic. Efforts were made to avoid opening up a western front against the Ukrainian nationalists, with the insurgent commander Oleksiy Chubenko negotiating a truce between the two parties in order to effectively oppose Denikin. But after nationalists forcibly broke up the Ekaterinoslav Soviet, the Makhnovists resolved to intervene on behalf of the Bolsheviks, who promised the anarchists military assistance which they had no way of providing. On 27 December, Makhno led a force of 600 insurgents in an attack against the city, quickly seizing the train station without bloodshed and taking over the guard posts. Despite seizing 20 machine guns, 4 artillery cannons and substantial ammunition, the Makhnovists were unprepared for street fighting in an urban environment, taking many more days to clear out the remaining nationalist forces from the city. Despite the anarchists playing the main role in the battle for Ekaterinoslav, the Bolsheviks decided that they would themselves take control of the city, appointing their own officers to key positions in the city's bureaucracy. But the anarchists and Left Socialist-Revolutionaries held firm to their majority on the city's revolutionary committee, preventing the seizure of power by the Bolsheviks, who responded by abandoning their military posts and allowing a nationalist counteroffensive to retake the city. With their main route of retreat cut off, the insurgents were forced to cross over the frozen Dnieper river, with many either drowning in the icy water or being cut down by nationalist gunfire.

The insurgents fell back to Huliaipole, where Viktor Bilash began preparations for a congress to reorganize the Don front, which was still made up of largely disconnected and poorly-supplied partisan detachments. On 3 January 1919, delegates from each of the 40 insurgent detachments met for the conference at Polohy. Delegates expressed their need for supplies and a central command, to which Bilash responded by proposing the reorganization of the detachments into regiments under the command of the Makhnovist general staff, a resolution that was passed unanimously. They elected a central command headed by Bilash, who reorganized the 6,200 troops stationed on the front into five regiments. Each of these regiments were made up of three battalions, which were in turn composed of three companies, in turn composed of three platoons, where every unit would elect their own commanders.

In the process of reorganizing, the insurgent army found itself surrounded on all sides: they faced 2,000 Ukrainian nationalists in the north; 5,000 Mennonite colonists in the west; and 4,500 White Volunteers in the south. But peasant conscripts within these forces often deserted and joined the Makhnovists, which saw their ranks swell over the following weeks: their southern front (250 km) came to count 15,000 rifles, 1,000 cavalry and 40 machine guns; the western front counted 2,000 insurgents; the northern front counted 10,000 insurgents; while 5,000 insurgents were kept in reserve at Huliaipole. By the middle of January 1919, the Makhnovist ranks totaled 29,000 fighters on the 550 km of front-lines and 20,000 in reserve. In response, the enemy ranks on all sides were sent reinforcements from the Caucasus: 2,000 infantry and 300 cavalry to the Mennonites; 10,000 infantry to the Whites at Berdyansk; while a further 2,000 infantry and 800 cavalry spearheaded a White offensive against Huliaipole. As conflict on all of these fronts intensified, many peasants fled to Huliaipole, followed closely by the White advance. On 23 January 1919, the First Regional Congress of Peasants, Workers and Fighters was held in Dibrivka. Units of the Insurgent Army and the rural districts of the Makhnovshchina sent 100 delegates, largely made up of Left Socialist-Revolutionaries and Maximalists, who sought to strengthen the front-lines with veterans of World War I and secure the release of peasant conscripts from the White Russian and Ukrainian nationalist ranks.

From 24 January to 4 February, the Makhnovists fought hard battles with the Whites in order to maintain control of their territory, using up almost all of their ammunition in the process. It was in this situation that they began to look to the Red Army as a potential ally.

=== Integration into the Red Army ===
Flag of the Ukrainian Soviet Socialist Republic (1919–29)

As conscripts began to desert the Ukrainian nationalist forces en masse, the Bolsheviks finally broke the Treaty of Brest-Litovsk and ordered the Red Army to invade Ukraine, with Christian Rakovsky proclaiming the establishment of the Ukrainian Soviet Socialist Republic in Kharkiv. After the Red Army captured Ekaterinoslav from the nationalists and Luhansk from the Whites, on 26 January, the Insurgent Army dispatched Oleksiy Chubenko to meet with the Bolshevik commander Pavel Dybenko and secure a military alliance between the two forces. The Insurgent Army was subsequently absorbed into the Ukrainian Soviet Army and became known as the 3rd Trans-Dnieper Brigade, with Dybenko promising to provide them with sorely-needed weapons, ammunition and money.

Although they were now themselves under Bolshevik command, the insurgents retained the structure that Bilash had established, including the free election of unit commanders. Bilash himself met with his new commander-in-chief Vladimir Antonov-Ovseenko, who reaffirmed the promise of additional supplies for the insurgents and the Red Army's intention to establish a communist society. By 4 February, the Bolsheviks' supply of ammunition had allowed the insurgents to go back on the offensive, resulting in the quick capture of Orikhiv, Polohy and Bakhmut. The newly supplied rifles also enabled the insurgents to arm their reserves, which caused the 3rd Brigade to experience a rapid growth in numbers, even surpassing the size of the division that it was integrated into. With their numbers swelling, the insurgents pushed south and east over the following month, capturing Berdiansk and Volnovakha respectively.

Despite growing tensions between the insurgents and their Bolshevik commanders, due to their political differences, the insurgents displayed marked solidarity with urban workers in Soviet Russia. In one case, the insurgents seized 100 wagons of grain (1,467 tons) from the White movement, which they immediately shipped to Moscow and Petrograd, in an independent action that drew hostility from the Bolshevik command. The insurgents were also called upon to defend the regional population from excesses committed by regiments of the Red Army, which were engaging in acts of robbery and antisemitic pogroms. The Insurgent Army itself harshly punished acts of antisemitism within its own ranks: the only documented case of insurgents committing a pogrom resulted in the execution of the perpetrators, with no more pogroms occurring in Makhnovist territory afterwards.

On 12 February, the Second Regional Congress of Peasants, Workers and Fighters was held in Huliaipole, drawing together 245 delegates from the Makhnovshchina's 350 rural districts. The delegation from Kharkiv reported on their negotiations with the secretary of the Ukrainian Soviet government, who they stated had reaffirmed the Bolsheviks' alliance with the insurgents. The Congress then turned its attention to the issue of the Communist Party's authority over the soviets, with the delegate from Novopavlovsk displaying marked frustration on the matter:

The Ukrainian provisional government stood by, first in Moscow and then in Kursk, until the workers and peasants of Ukraine had liberated the territory of enemies. [...] Now that the enemy is beaten... some government appears in our midst describing itself as Bolshevik and aiming to impose its party dictatorship upon us. Is that to be countenanced? ...We are non-party insurgents, and we have revolted against all our oppressors; we will not countenance a new enslavement, no matter the quarter whence it may come!

In defiance of the Bolsheviks, the Congress thus passed a resolution declaring the establishment of "freely elected, anti-authoritarian soviets", which would be independent of any political party. It also resolved to elect a Military Revolutionary Council, which would act as the executive power of the Makhnovschina between congresses; established a supply section to distribute equipment throughout the frontlines; and ordered a "voluntary" and "egalitarian" mobilization to ensure the continued functioning of the wartime economy. By this time, the insurgents had experienced such a rapid influx of volunteers that they were unable to supply all of them with weapons, which left 70,000 people in reserve while 30,000 active-duty troops fought on the front-lines.

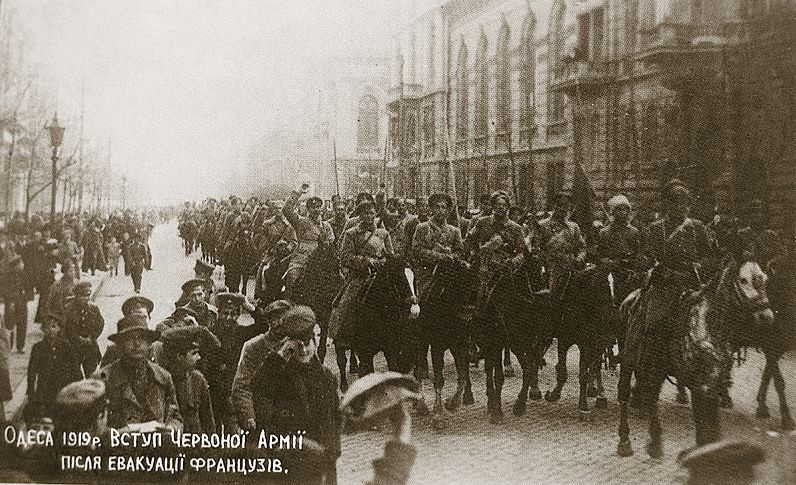
The 6th Ukrainian Soviet Division of ataman Nykyfor Hryhoriv, during their entry into Odesa, in April 1919.

To the Makhnovists, their integration into the Red Army had been an exclusively military decision, but the Bolsheviks saw it through a political lens, and took the decision to be a tacit recognition of the Ukrainian Soviet Republic's authority. The Ukrainian Soviet Army was itself composed "almost exclusively of detachments of local partisans", to the chagrin of the Bolshevik leadership, which sought to impose a strict military hierarchy over the partisans, deposing a number of popular atamans and introducing political commissars to oversee the army's Bolshevization. The Makhnovists were openly resentful of the auditing by the Cheka and commissars, with some insurgents even being shot for not submitting to Bolshevik ideology. This resentment was intensified when the Bolsheviks' pledged material support did not manifest, with the insurgents receiving 3,000 poorly-made rifles and 100,000 rounds of ammunition, but none of the machine guns or artillery cannons which the Red Army command had promised. The supply of weapons was intentionally restricted by the Bolsheviks, who themselves resented the strong influence of anarchists and Left SRs within the insurgent ranks, particularly bemoaning the presence of Dmitry Popov, who had led the Left SR uprising before defecting to the Ukrainian anarchist movement. Josef Dybets, an anarcho-syndicalist turned Bolshevik who headed a revolutionary committee in Berdyansk, would later boast of sabotaging the Makhnovist supply chains, recalling that he had once rerouted a requested shipment of leather at a time when "half of the Makhnovists were virtually barefoot". Despite the hostilities between the Soviet factions, the insurgents continued to aid the offensive against the Whites in Crimea, even pushing as far as Denikin's headquarters in Taganrog before abruptly halting due to their lack of arms and ammunition, equipment which they then attempted to seize from a French detachment at Mariupol.

On 10 April, the Third Regional Congress of Peasants, Workers and Fighters was held in Huliaipole, bringing together delegates from 72 districts, who represented over two million people. Before the Congress could adjourn, they received a telegram from Pavel Dybenko, who pronounced the congress to be "counter-revolutionary", declared its participants to be outlaws and threatened them with "the most rigorous repressive measures". The Military Revolutionary Council sent a response that defended the Congress against these charges, explaining that it had first been convened to coordinate the activities of the insurgent army, at a time when the Red Army did not yet have any presence in the region. They even went so far as to elaborate the reasons for the insurgent movement's very existence, calling on Dybenko to reconsider his labelling of millions of workers as "counter-revolutionaries", asking of him:

Can it be that laws laid down by a handful of individuals, describing themselves as revolutionaries, can afford them the right to declare outside of the law an entire people more revolutionary than themselves? [...] Is it tolerable or reasonable that laws of violence be thrust upon the lives of a people which has just rid itself of all lawmakers and all laws? Is there some law according to which a revolutionary is alleged to have the right to enforce the harshest punishment against the revolutionary mass on whose behalf he fights, and this because that same mass has secured for itself the benefits that the revolutionary promised them... freedom and equality? Can that mass remain silent when the "revolutionary" strips it of the freedom which it has just won? Does the law of revolution require the shooting of a delegate on the grounds that he is striving to achieve in life the task entrusted to him by the revolutionary mass which appointed him? What interests should the revolutionary defend? Those of the party? Or those of the people at the cost of whose blood the revolution has been set in motion?

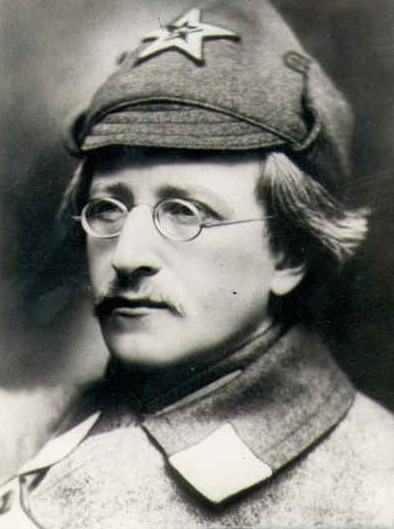
Vladimir Antonov-Ovseenko, commander-in-chief of the Ukrainian Soviet Army and vocal supporter of the Makhnovists.

The Military Revolutionary Council thus closed its letter by declaring its intention to continue its activities, as it considered itself responsible directly to the people it represented. The controversy drew the attention of Vladimir Antonov-Ovseenko, who on 28 April visited Huliaipole, in order to better gauge the situation on the ground. The Ukrainian commander-in-chief was given a warm welcome by the locals, who greeted him with an orchestral rendition of The Internationale. At the insurgent capital, Makhno informed Antonov-Ovseenko of the situation at the front, introduced him to members of the local Soviet and reunited him with his "old acquaintance" Maria Nikiforova. He subsequently inspected the brigade's reserve regiment, describing them as "devour[ing him] with their eyes" while they listened to his speech about their collective struggle and the "necessity for iron discipline". As news came in of the insurgents' successful capture of Mariupol, Makhno proceeded to promise further successes at the front, provided that the insurgents received the necessary equipment. Makhno further elaborated on the material shortages that the insurgents were suffering and bemoaned the problems caused by the 9th Soviet Reserve Division, which he described as "prone to panic", claiming that "its command's sympathies lay with the Whites." Antonov-Ovseenko was also greeted with salutes by insurgents that had been charged with banditry and later sat down with them for a meal, after which he toured a number of the town's secondary schools and hospitals. Antonov-Ovseenko would later note that while his report may have appeared to grant the insurgents some undue idealization, he insisted that he had striven to provide an objective account.

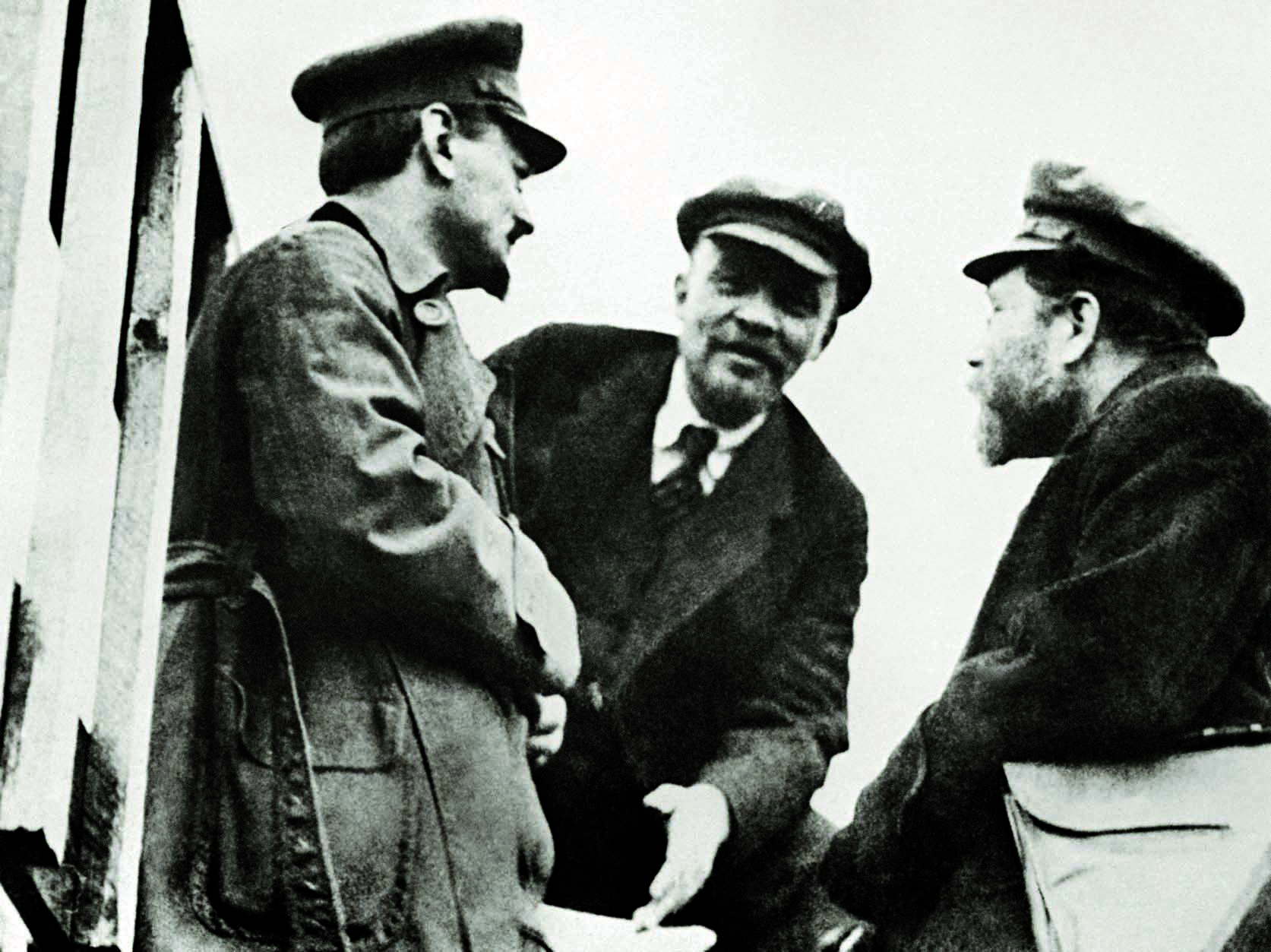
Leon Trotsky, Vladimir Lenin and Lev Kamenev in 1919.

The following day, Antonov-Ovseenko sent a message to Christian Rakovsky, in which the commander-in-chief praised the insurgents and categorically refuted the allegations of an anti-Soviet conspiracy, requesting the Ukrainian Soviet government to put an immediate end to the "senseless punitive measures" against the anarchists. He also openly criticised the Izvestia for publishing anti-anarchist attack pieces, declaring them to be deliberately provocative acts of misinformation and defending the Makhnovists as having demonstrated "extraordinary revolutionary valor". Finally, he ordered Anatoly Skachko to provide the Makhnovists with the supplies they urgently needed, officially requesting they be sent artillery cannons, 4 million rubles, ammunition, medical supplies and personnel, and an armored train, among other miscellaneous pieces of equipment. Antonov-Ovseenko was thereafter criticized for his anarchist sympathies by Leon Trotsky, who urged him to focus their resources on the White offensive in Donbas, to which he responded by reiterating his defense of the Makhnovists and criticising the Red Army's high command in Moscow for their lack of understanding of the military situation in Ukraine. Despite his best efforts, Antonov-Ovseenko's request to better equip the Makhnovists was not met and anti-anarchist polemics continued in the Bolshevik press.

Nevertheless, Antonov-Ovseenko's reports attracted a number of prominent Bolshevik officials, including Lev Kamenev, to themselves visit Huliaipole the very next week. Again to the tune of The Internationale, they were greeted by Nikiforova and Makhno, who gave them a tour of the town. After the initial pleasantries, disagreements soon erupted when the Bolsheviks demanded the Military Revolutionary Council be abolished, a proposal which the insurgents could not accept as it was "created by the masses and on no account could it be disbanded by any authority at all." Despite this, the Bolsheviks and anarchists parted on friendly terms, with Kamenev promising they would "always find a common language with authentic revolutionaries like the Makhnovists." Kamenev immediately requested Nikiforova's conviction be commuted and published an open letter in which he refuted the misinformation being disseminated about the Makhnovists. Like Antonov-Ovseenko before him, Kamenev again called for the insurgents to be supplied with the necessary equipment that they had been promised by the government, claiming that meeting this request would help alleviate the disagreements between the two factions.

=== Mutinies in the Red Army ===
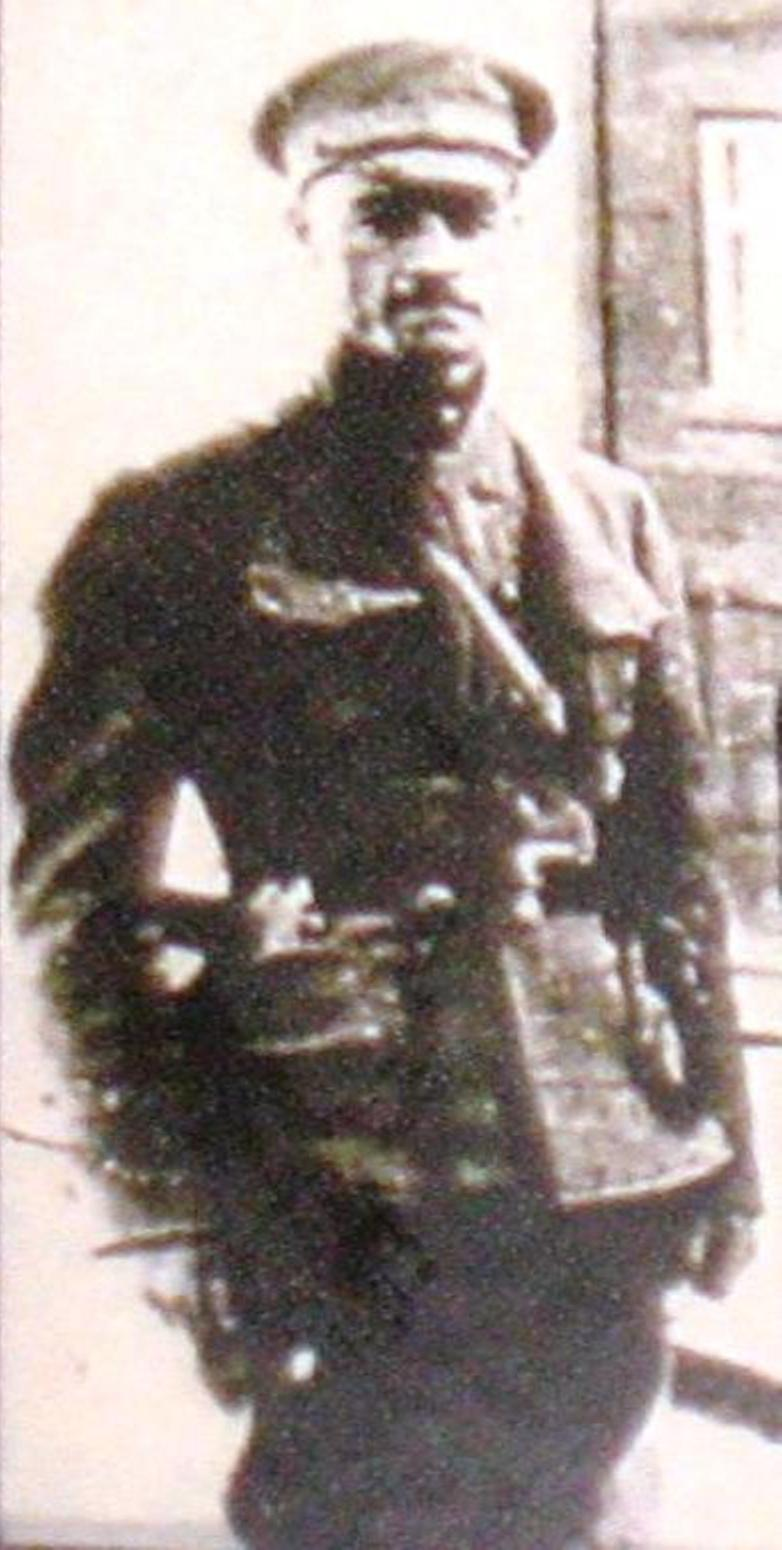
Nykyfor Hryhoriv, ataman of the green army in Kherson.

A few days later, the 6th Ukrainian Soviet Division under ataman Nykyfor Hryhoriv refused an order to relieve the Hungarian Soviet Republic by way of an attack against the Kingdom of Romania. Hryhoriv's "Green Army" subsequently launched an uprising against the Bolsheviks, taking with them significant amounts of equipment and seizing control of parts of Western Ukraine. On 12 May, Kamenev sent a message to the Makhnovists, urging them to condemn Hryhoriv and side with the Bolsheviks, under threat of a "declaration of war". The Makhnovists responded by reiterating their loyalty to the Revolution and declaring that they would continue to fight on the front-lines until they had defeated the White movement. However, they stopped short of the requested condemnation, as they were still unaware of the details about Hryhoriv's uprising and resolved to put together a commission to investigate the affair.

The Makhnovist emissaries commissioned to investigate Hryhoriv were quickly arrested by the Bolsheviks, who accused them of being spies attempting to form an alliance with Hryhoriv. After they were released, the emissaries uncovered evidence of Hryhoriv's forces having committed pogroms. The commission would end up issuing a condemnation against the "warlord", denouncing him specifically for his antisemitism and chauvinism, while also leaving room for the peasants that followed him to "leave Hryhoriv and rally again to the banner of revolution." However, they also analyzed the cause of his uprising to have been in reaction to the political repression in Ukraine, blaming the Bolsheviks for creating the conditions for the revolt. It was this proclamation, combined with severe Red Army losses against Hryhoriv, that led the high command to consolidate their forces around the Makhnovists, hoping that this would prevent them too from revolting.

The poorly-equipped insurgents were then left almost entirely responsible for the southern front against the Whites. Following a tactical error by a Bolshevik-led division, the Kuban Cossacks led by Andrei Shkuro managed to breach through the soviet lines and captured Yuzovka, taking numerous Bolsheviks and Makhnovists as prisoners and having them hanged. According to Antonov-Ovseenko, the Makhnovists' inability to withstand this assault was due to their continuing lack of supplies and reinforcements, as the Red Army high command had turned its attentions towards Hryhoriv. Despite themselves having underestimated Shkuro's forces, the Red Army high command instead lay blame for the defeat on the Makhnovists and resolved to eliminate them, which caused a breakdown in the Red chain-of command as Antonov-Ovseenko again came to the insurgents' defense. The commander of the 2nd Ukrainian Soviet Army, Anatoly Skachko, decided to convert Makhno's brigade into the 7th Ukrainian Soviet Division, as doing so would give them the necessary pretext to fill the insurgent ranks with Bolshevik party members and political commissars. Despite on the surface being an authentic deployment, Skachko described the conversion as an "organizational reshuffle" which would reign in the autonomy of the insurgents and set the groundwork for their liquidation.

Antonov-Ovseenko was able to foil Skachko's plan and attempted to revert the insurgent detachment into a brigade, but the insurgents had already become alienated with their high command, resolving to reassert their autonomy and reestablish themselves as an "independent insurgent army". On 29 May, the insurgents issued a communique to the Ukrainian Front's command and the Council of People's Commissars, demanding that they be granted their requested independence, albeit still subject to the general command of the Southern Front, as they ultimately remained committed to their alliance with the Bolsheviks. Despite these attempts at concilliation, the Bolshevik Revolutionary Military Council responded by pronouncing Makhno to be an outlaw, issuing a warrant for his arrest and for him to be tried before a revolutionary tribunal.

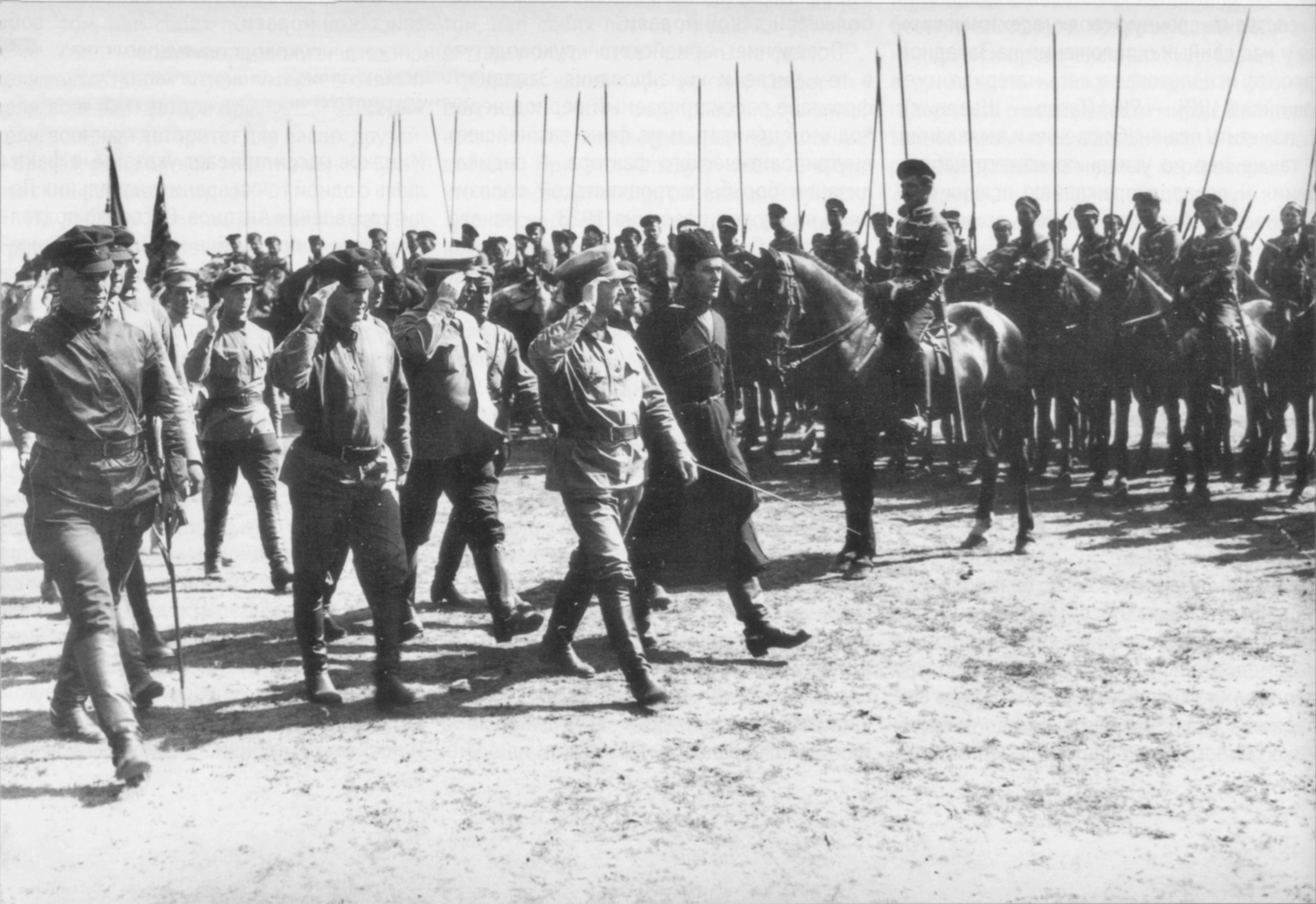
Leon Trotsky inspecting troops of the Ukrainian Front in Kharkiv.

On 31 May, the Makhnovist Military Revolutionary Council in Huliaipole responded by convening an extraordinary congress, declaring that "only the toiling masses will be able to devise a way out of the situation created, and not parties or individuals." Set for 15 June, the Fourth Regional Congress of Peasants, Workers and Fighters was to be held in Huliaipole, bringing together delegates from 90 districts throughout Southern and Eastern Ukraine, with each delegate representing either workers, peasants, insurgent units, the Makhnovist general staff, or branches of pro-Soviet political organizations. This renewed display of direct democracy in Ukraine was attacked directly by Leon Trotsky, who particularly took issue with the organization of the Insurgent Army, which he described as the "ugliest face of guerrilla warfare", due to its lack of enforced discipline and the voluntary election of its commanders by their units. Trotsky concluded his remarks by calling for repression to be carried out against any "atamans and straw commanders" in Ukraine and openly declaring his intention to abolish "the independent anarchist republic of Huliaipole", even to the extent of prioritizing the neutralization of the Makhnovists over fighting the White offensive against Kharkiv. According to Peter Arshinov, Trotsky would have preferred to surrender all of Ukraine to the White movement, rather than let the Makhnovschina continue to develop. Due to his sympathies for the insurgents, Antonov-Ovseenko was stripped of his command over the Ukrainian Front and replaced with Jukums Vācietis, a Latvian former Imperial Army officer. According to Alexandre Skirda, on 6 June, Trotsky signed Order 107, which banned the upcoming insurgent congress and ordered the arrest of any deserters from the Red Army units which joined Makhno to stand before the revolutionary tribunal and face punishment by firing squad.

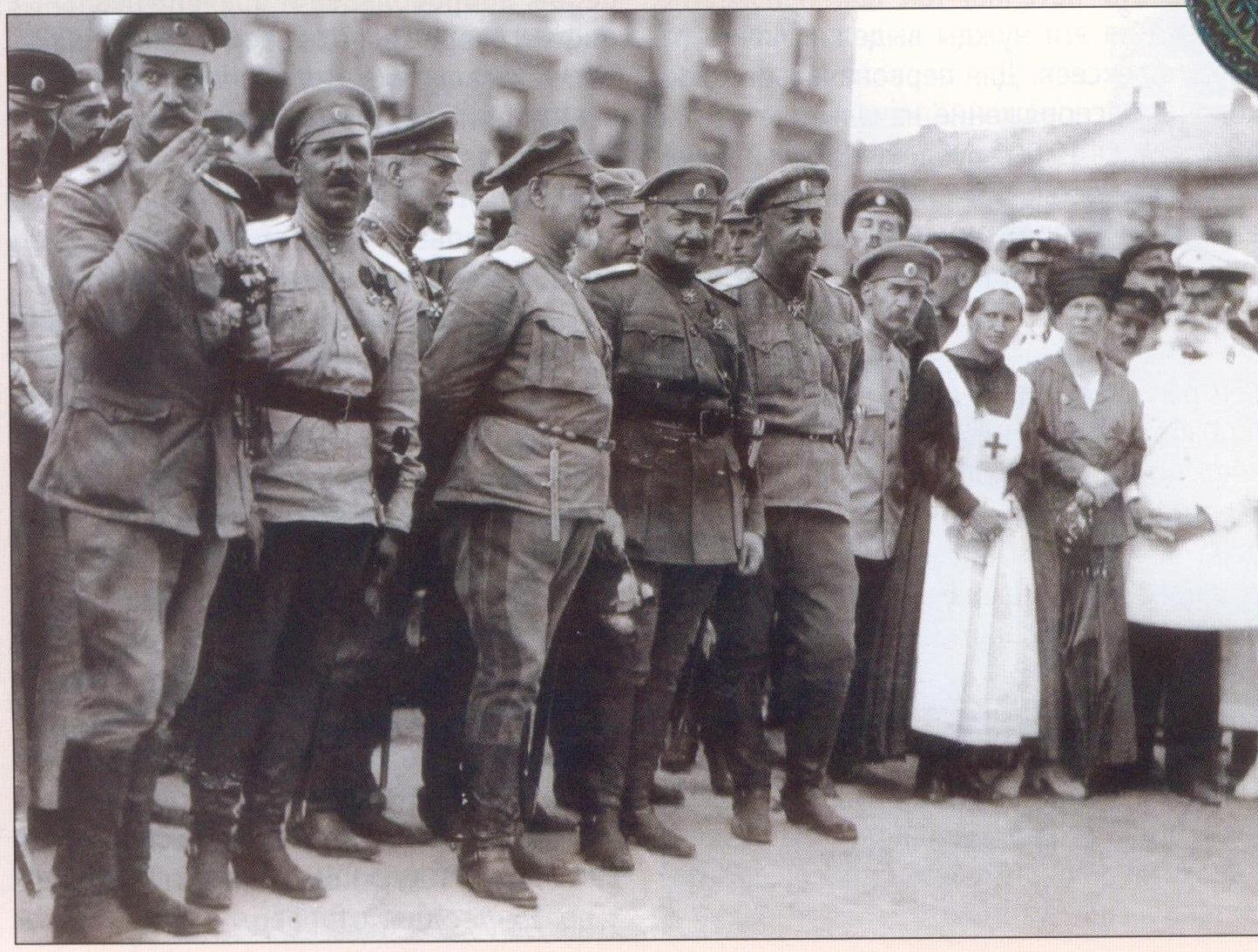
Anton Denikin and his officers in Kharkiv, following the White offensive.

Despite their lack of supplies and isolation from the Bolsheviks, the Makhnovists mounted a counter-offensive against the White positions at Yuzovka. With the previously Bolshevik-held section of the front at Grishino left unmanned, the Kuban Cossacks took the opportunity to attack Huliaipole, which they took after "bitter fighting" with the local insurgents. Attempts by Huliaipole's local peasantry to resist the White attack, armed only with farming tools and a few rifles, were met with a massacre at the hands of the Cossacks. This surprise attack forced the insurgents to retreat from Mariupol and even give up Huliaipole to the Cossacks. It was then that the Makhnovists first learnt of Trotsky's declaration of war against them, but they continued to focus their attention of the White offensive, with Makhno even resigning his post in an attempt to appease the Bolsheviks. On 8 June, Trotsky responded with a hail of attacks against the Makhnovists, relishing the fall of Huliaipole to the Whites and declaring that "Makhno's rebellion is in the process of liquidation." Despite the rebuff, the following day, Makhno again attempted to offer the Bolsheviks his resignation and the subordination of the insurgent forces to the Red Army high command, reaffirming the terms of the alliance.

With Makhno's command of the 7th Division relinquished, Trotsky appointed Alexander Krusser to take over leadership of the front, while Makhno declared his intention to wage a guerrilla war against the Whites from the rear. Trotsky then ordered Kliment Voroshilov to arrest the retreating Makhnovists, but they managed to intercept the message. The insurgents then found Voroshilov's armored train surrounded by Whites and saved their "would-be executioners" with a cavalry charge and machine gun fire. After unsuccessfully attempting to coax Makhno into their custody, Voroshilov's detachment arrested and shot a number of members of the Makhnovist general staff. Trotsky also ordered the arrest of the Makhnovist chief of staff, Ozerov, who was tried by Martin Latsis and shot the following month.

While the Red Army command had become preoccupied with the Makhnovists and Hryhorivites, they had increasingly ignored the front against the Whites. Within weeks, eastern Ukraine had fallen entirely into the hands of the White movement, with even the Ukrainian Soviet capital of Kharkiv falling before the end of June.

=== Renewed independence ===
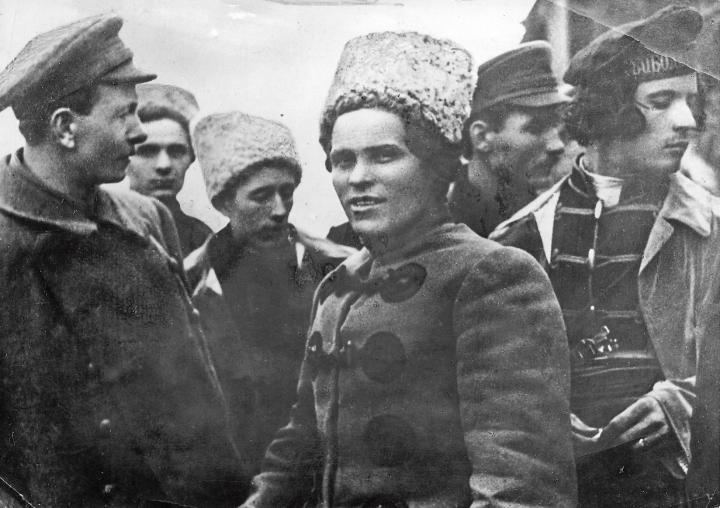
Commanders of the Insurgent Army, including Semen Karetnyk, Fedir Shchus and Nestor Makhno.

No longer under Red Army command, the insurgents were reduced to a small sotnia, which counted 100–150 cavalry and a few tachanki. This detachment was led by many of the original founders of the insurgent anarchist movement, including Semen Karetnyk, Fedir Shchus, Nestor and Hryhorii Makhno. They soon came upon a White attack against Alexandrovsk, with the local leader of the Bolsheviks attempting to enlist their aid, but the insurgents refused due in part to a lack of manpower and the continuation of their status as outlaws. When other insurgent detachments within the Red Army discovered that Makhno had been outlawed, they resolved to join him, with one brigade that had been named after Lenin even joining the Makhnovists. Makhno's sotnia soon linked up with other insurgent detachments that had fled from the White-occupied territories in Donbas, causing the Makhnovist ranks to grow by the thousands.

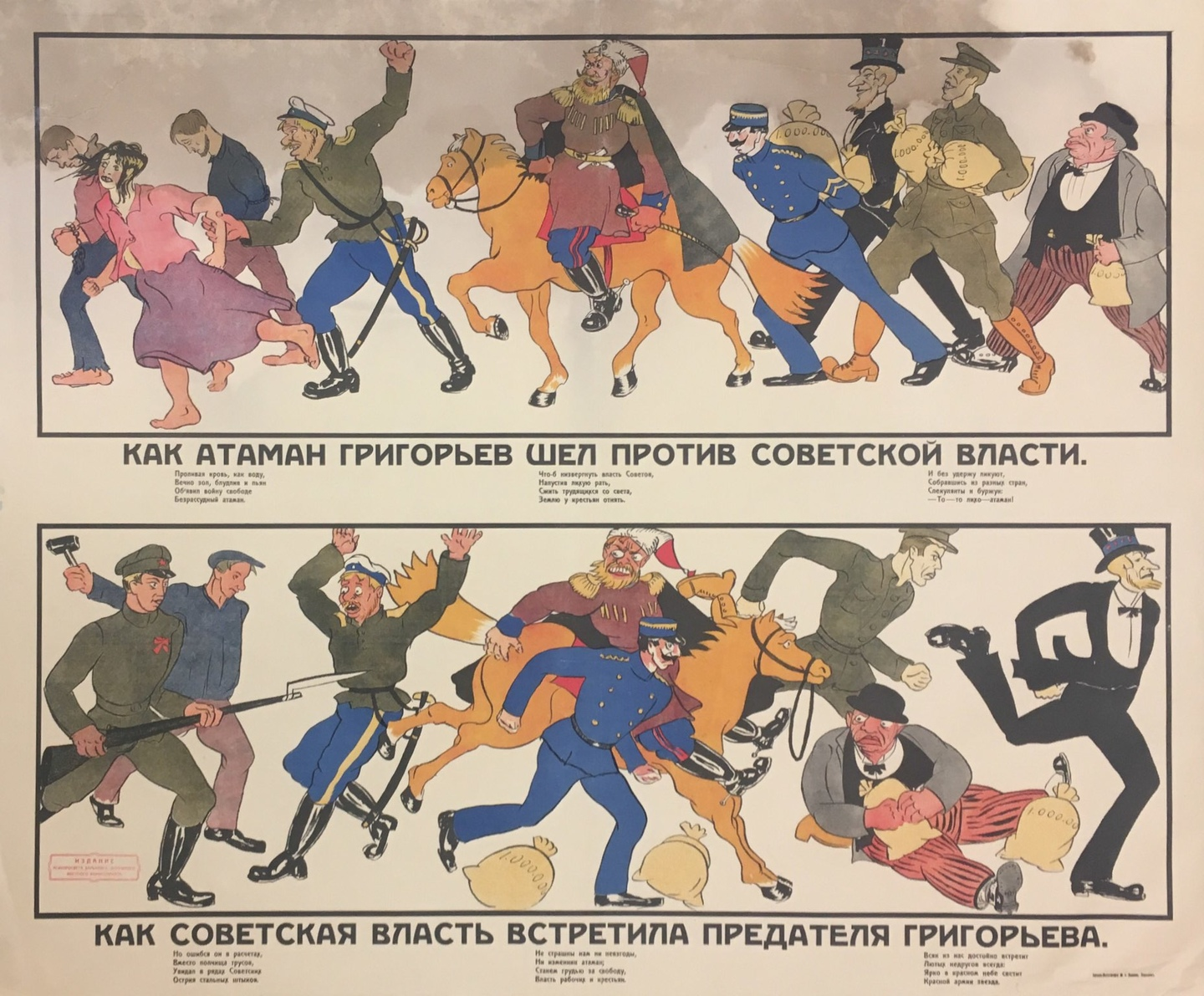
Bolshevik propaganda poster depicting the struggle against otaman Nykyfor Hryhoriv, 1919.

The Insurgent Army retreated to the right-bank, into the territory of Nykyfor Hryhoriv's Green Army. Hryhoriv was still at war with the Red forces of Pavel Dybenko and had become infamous for his antisemitism, having carried out pogroms that killed 3,000 people in Elisavetgrad alone. Due to Hryhoriv's support among the poor peasantry of Kherson, the Makhnovists made overtures to form an alliance with the Greens, while also setting up a commission to investigate Hryhoriv's antisemitism and his suspected collaboration with the White movement. The decision was made to merge the Green and Black forces and, on 27 July, the two held a mass meeting of 20,000 insurgents in Sentovo. After Hryhoriv called for war against the Reds and an alliance with the Whites, Oleksiy Chubenko spoke out against him, revealing the results of the Makhnovist investigation and condemning the "warlord" as a "counter-revolutionary". When Hryhoriv attempted to shoot Makhno, he was shot first by Chubenko, killing the Ataman of Kherson. The Makhnovists immediately reported the act to the assembled green partisans, many of whom were then recruited into the anarchist ranks, while others rejoined the Red Army to fight against them.

With the Bolsheviks having quit Eastern Ukraine, the Ukrainian Soviet Socialist Republic was liquidated and the Red Army fell back to the right-bank of the Dnieper, purging their ranks of any remaining Makhnovists in the process. Former Makhnovist detachments were reorganized into the 58th Division by its political commissar Josef Dybets, who himself had no combat experience. Finding himself unable to sufficiently discipline the "independent" and "Zaporog" Melitopol regiment, he began looking for troops that could liquidate the unit. Other regiments within the division refused, forcing Dybets to enlist 700 Germans of the Spartacus League. He told them that the regiment in question had mutinied and quit the front, ordering the Spartacists to disarm and even shoot them, while the Melitopol regiment themselves had refused to fight back against "their own". But despite Dybets' best efforts, the Red Army command had decided to quit the Ukrainian front entirely and fall back to Central Russia, as the White movement had begun to move against Moscow. However, much of the 58th Division refused to abandon Ukraine and subsequently left the Red Army, arresting their Bolshevik command and routing the Spartacists, before returning into the ranks of the Makhnovists.

Towards the end of August, the Insurgent Army was reconstituted at Pomichna, as the Red Army defectors joined with Makhno's 700 cavalry and 3,000 infantry, forming a 20,000-strong armed force. The reestablished Insurgent Army was made up of three infantry brigades and a cavalry brigade commanded by Shchus, as well as an artillery division, machine-gun regiment and Makhno's personal "Black Guards". Many former green soldiers proved to be insubordinate and were thus discharged, as they still held on to antisemitism and lacked any "revolutionary consciousness". The Makhnovist ranks were also joined by the Nabat, with the insurgents even having broken Volin out of prison, in the territory of the Ukrainian People's Republic.

Iona Yakir was also struggling with the Makhnovist sympathies within his own 45th Division, itself consisting largely of insurgents, while retreating from the White offensive against Odesa. The Red Army command resolved to stear clear of the Makhnovist lines, in order to avoid more defections, as they would be unable to reliably count on their own troops in an open conflict with the Insurgent Army. While retreating from Ukraine, the Red Army even destroyed their own equipment in order to prevent it from falling into the hands of the insurgents, blowing up their armored trains in Mykolaiv and Bârzula. While retreating to Kyiv, the Makhnovist sympathisers within the 45th Division were assigned to fight against the Ukrainian nationalists, during which the anarchist commander A.V. Mokrousov led the capture of an entire nationalist division's general staff, whilst engagements with the Makhnovists were handled exclusively by the Cheka. The final retreat of the Red Army from Ukraine left the country divided between the anarchists, Ukrainian nationalists and White Russians.

=== Campaign against the White Army ===
The Whites found their forces divided between the Russian and Ukrainian fronts, with 150,000 of their troops taking part in the advance on Moscow, while only 15,000 held Eastern Ukraine. The nationalist forces immediately retreated from the White advance, which allowed the bulk of the White forces to converge on the Makhnovist positions at Voznesensk and Yelisavetgrad. The first engagement between the Whites and Makhnovists was a surprise encounter outside Pomichna on 20 August, during which the White forces suffered heavy losses, including a number of their armored trains. The insurgents subsequently launched a number of cavalry attacks into the rear of the White lines, forcing 5,000 of the White troops to dig in around Yelisavetgrad, planning a flanking maneuver at Olviopol to cut the Makhnovists off from their supply lines and force them to retreat to the north-west. On 5 September, they began their offensive with the bloodless capture of Arbuzynka and Kostiantynivka, but the two towns were quickly recaptured by the insurgents. The Whites again retook Arbuzynka and captured 300 prisoners of war, after the insurgents were forced to surrender due to a lack of ammunition, which became the main reason for the successes of the more well-supplied Whites against the insurgents. According to Peter Arshinov, two-thirds of insurgent attacks during this period were attempts to capture White munitions. One notable example of this was the insurgent attack against Pomichna on 6 September, when a combined assault of the insurgents' armored trains and infantry, supported by a cavalry attack on the White rear at Mykolaivka, resulted in the capture of wagon-loads of ammunition. In the following days, the insurgents continued to raid behind the White lines, pinning them down at Pomichna and cutting them off from their rearguard. It was during one of these attacks that Hryhorii Makhno was killed.

With the insurgents beginning to force the Whites back east, Yakov Slashchov assumed sole command of the front against the Makhnovists and was ordered by the White general staff to remain in control of Yelisavetgrad "at any price". Slashchov quickly launched an offensive into the insurgents' rear, rescuing a White division that had been trapped at Novoukrainka, but a counterattack forced them back to Pomichna, causing 300 White casualties. According to Slashchov himself, the increasing Makhnovist assaults behind their lines were "sowing panic" within the White ranks, putting them in a position where they would either need to "fall back immediately in order to capture the Makhnovists' forces by night, and thus regain complete freedom of maneuver, or else attack at daybreak." They resolved to attack the following day, causing the insurgents to retreat towards Uman and allowing the Whites to recover 400 POWs and three artillery cannons. The insurgents continued their retreat for two weeks, carrying with them 8,000 wounded and sick people, while engaging in daily skirmishes with the Whites. When the arrived at Uman, they found it in the hands of the Ukrainian nationalists, who offered them neutral ground for their wounded to be treated on. The Insurgent Army, now down to 8,000 troops, dug in outside of Uman and issued an appeal to nationalist troops that denounced their leader Symon Petliura as a "champion of the bourgeois classes".

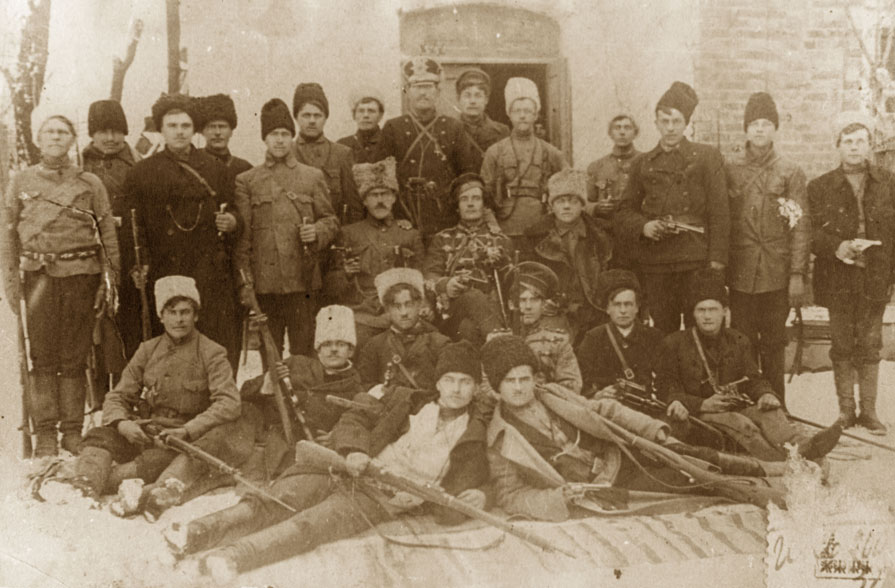
Insurgent Army combat group, headed by Fedir Shchus (center)

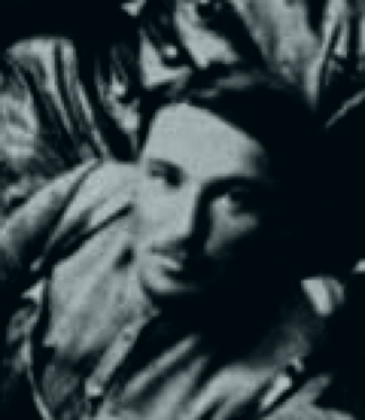
Panteleimon Belochub, a soldier best known as one of the commanders of the Revolutionary Insurgent Army of Ukraine

On 22 September, the Whites attacked the surrounded insurgents at Peregonovka, intending to finally annihilate them. Over the following days, skirmishes over the village resulted in its transfer between both sides, culminating in the Battle of Peregonovka on 26 September. The insurgent infantry assaulted the White positions in the east and their cavalry attacked the White regiments from behind in the west, successfully routing the enemy forces. The Whites fell back to the Syniukha, with one regiment going as far as Lysa Hora, abandoning the others to the insurgent assault. The White colonel Vladimir Almendinger reported that the retreat was constantly under attack by the insurgents, leading to a breakdown in the chain of command, with the Whites using what little ammunition they had remaining to repel the insurgent cavalry. In desperation, Almendinger's unit was forced to swim across the river and fall back to Novoukrainka, having sustained heavy losses, with barely 100 men remaining out of 6 companies. The final line of retreat was covered by a battalion of 60 men under the command of Boris Gattenberger, who shot himself after his men were all killed in a hail of insurgent machine gun fire and sabre charges. With the tide turned in the favor of the insurgents, they sent their cavalry and artillery in pursuit of the retreating Whites, leaving only a few hundred survivors. The insurgents also captured 23 artillery cannons and 100 machine guns, and took 120 officers and 500 soldiers as prisoners of war.

The White defeat at Peregonovka marked the turning point for the entire civil war, with a number of White officers remarking in that moment: "It's over." As the White movement in Ukraine was no longer able to mount an assault, the 7,000-strong insurgent army split up in different directions to capitalize on their victory. In just over a week, the insurgents had occupied a vast territory in southern and eastern Ukraine, including the major cities of Kryvyi Rih, Yelisavetgrad, Nikopol, Melitopol, Aleksandrovsk, Berdiansk, Mariupol and the Makhnovist capital of Huliaipole. By 20 October, the insurgents had occupied the southern stronghold of Yekaterinoslav, taken full control of the regional rail network and blocked the Allied ports on the southern coast. As the Whites had now been cut off from their supply lines, the advance on Moscow was halted only 200 kilometers outside of the Russian capital, with the Cossack forces of Konstantin Mamontov and Andrei Shkuro being diverted back towards Ukraine. Mamontov's 25,000-strong detachment quickly forced the Makhnovists to fall back from the sea of Azov, relinquishing control of the port cities of Berdiansk and Mariupol. Nevertheless, the insurgents maintained control of the Dnieper and continued on to capture the cities of Pavlohrad, Synelnykove and Chaplyne.

In the areas that were "liberated from all authority by the Makhnovist insurgents", locals were invited to elect their own Soviets and convoke regional congresses as the decision-making body for the region. In each town, the Insurgent Army appointed its own ambassadors to act as a liaison between the elected bodies and the armed forces, themselves not holding "any civil or military authority". The Makhnovists themselves were greatly concerned with their own conduct in the captured areas, aiming not to interfere with renewed soviet democracy and stressing that they would not commit "violence or looting, nor questionable searches" against the local populations.

During a congress held in Aleksandrovsk at the end of October, a call was made for a "voluntary mobilization" of young partisans into the insurgent army, with those under 25 being dispatched to the front, while those over 25 would be committed to "local self-defense". The mobilizations resulted in the insurgent army's ranks swelling to 80,000 soldiers, who together controlled almost the entirety of southern Ukraine. The Congress further decided that the army would be supplied by equipment captured from enemies, expropriations from the bourgeoisie and voluntary contributions made by the peasantry. Of the 100 million rubles seized from banks, Congress distributed 45 million to the insurgents, reserving another 3 million for the families of combatants. Workers in Berdiansk that prepared artillery pieces for the Makhnovists even extracted payment for their services, in stark contrast to the requisitioning practices of the Red and White armies. Congress also forbade the insurgents from consuming alcohol, under penalty of execution by firing squad. Barrels of alcohol were instead arranged by Lev Zadov to be supplied to the Cossack detachments of Andrei Shkuro, with the intention of "sapping their fighting spirit."

While the Makhnovists were at work attempting to construct a new society in Yekaterinoslav, they faced attacks from within by the Bolsheviks and from without by the White Cossacks. On 5 December, the Bolsheviks attempted to stage a coup d'etat by poisoning Makhno but the plan was uncovered and the conspirators were executed. On 22 December, Yakov Slashchov led an attack against the city that forced the Makhnovists out after a week of fighting, leaving thousands of sick and wounded insurgents behind in the city and resulting in the cancellation of the planned Fourth Regional Congress. Epidemic typhus had also taken a toll on both sides of the conflict, with many insurgents having already succumbed to the disease. By the end of 1919, only 10,000 healthy soldiers remained in the insurgent ranks, most of whom were forced to retreat to their stronghold around Huliaipole, Melitopol and Nikopol. With the Makhnovists on the defensive and the White Russians retreating back towards the Caucasus, the Red Army once again launched an invasion of Ukraine.

=== Campaign against the Red Army ===
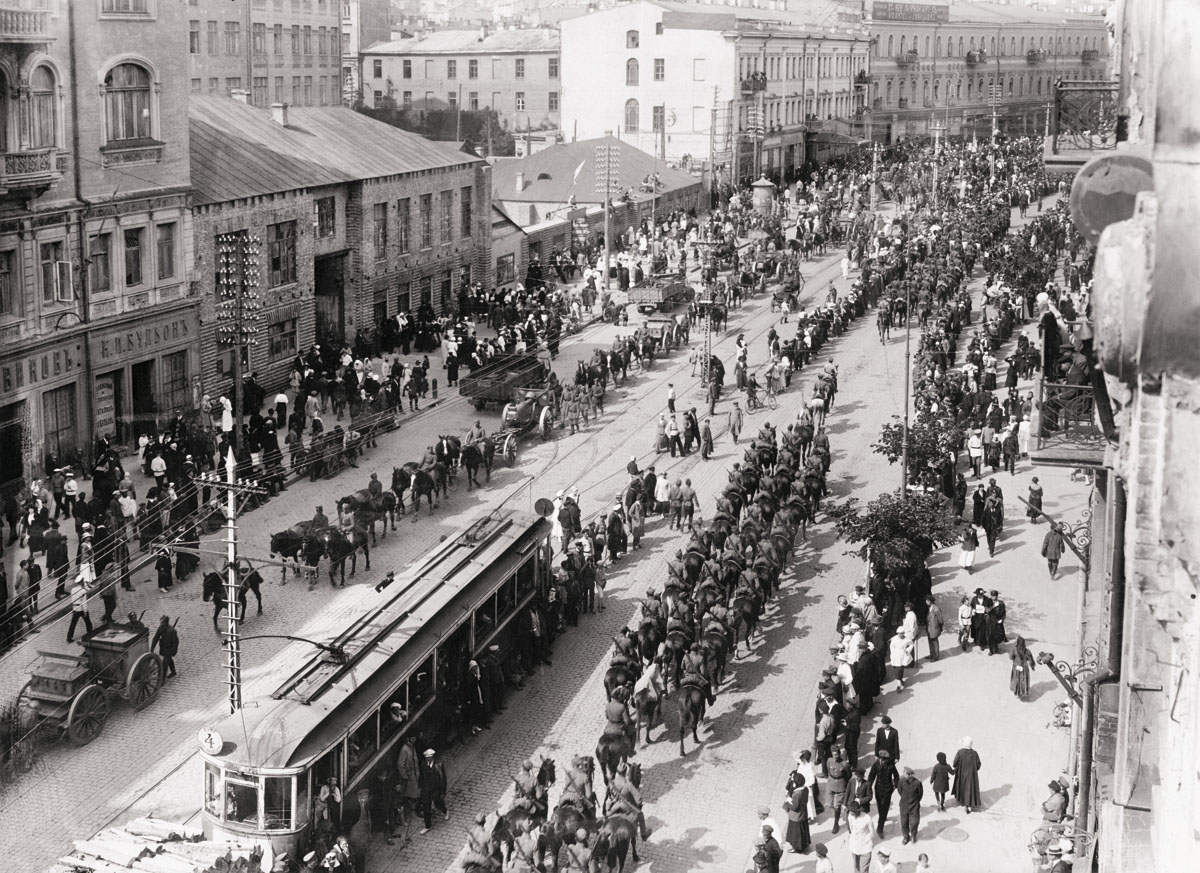
Polish troops in Kyiv, during the Polish–Soviet War.

With the White movement falling into a retreat, the territories that had been cleared by the Insurgent Army were occupied by the Red Army, which re-established the Ukrainian Soviet Socialist Republic. The two factions initially reunited amicably, but political divisions between the two quickly created a rift. When the Insurgents refused to integrate themselves into the Red Army and transfer to the Polish front, the Ukrainian Soviet government declared them to be outlaws. By February 1920, the Red Army had captured most of the region from the insurgents, forcing them underground.

In the areas they captured, the Bolsheviks carried out the Red Terror and implemented their policy of war communism, resulting in a resurgence of peasant revolts. The Insurgent Army soon reconstituted itself and launched a campaign of guerrilla warfare against the Bolsheviks, targeting attacks against members of the Cheka and requisitioning units. By Spring 1920, the Makhnovists had regrouped their forces enough to begin launching larger operations again, attacking the Red Army garrison at Huliaipole and successfully encouraging many Red troops to defect to their "Third Revolution". The Insurgent and Red armies continued to fight each other for months, but when a White offensive pushed as far as the gates of Katernyoslav, their priorities began to shift towards combating the counter-revolutionary advance.

=== Alliance with the Red Army ===
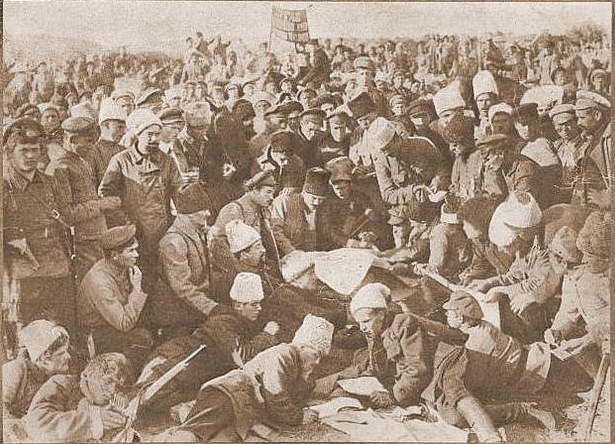
The Insurgent Army stationed in Starobilsk, making plans to attack the Army of Wrangel in September 1920.

The Insurgent Army found itself trapped between the Red and White armies, facing attacks from both, which ignited an argument within the Makhnovist leadership over whether or not to form an alliance with the Red Army. A general assembly of the Insurgent Army narrowly came out in favour of such an alliance.

On 2 October, Mikhail Frunze ratified the proposed pact and ordered an immediate end to hostilities with the Insurgent Army. According to the military agreement: the Insurgent Army was to subject itself to Red Army's high command, while retaining its internal structure and autonomy; and the insurgents pledged not to accept any units or deserters from the Red Army into its ranks. Despite the earlier hostilities, the insurgents acceded to the Bolshevik overtures, justifying the pact as a necessity due to the fight against Wrangel.

By the end of October, the insurgents had recaptured much of their home region and driven the Whites back to Crimea. Led by Semen Karetnyk, the insurgents then played a key role in the battle for Crimea, defeating the Whites and bringing an end to the Southern Front of the Russian Civil War.

=== Renewed conflict with the Red Army ===
Following the defeat of the Whites, the insurgent chief-of-staff Hryhory Vasylivsky declared the end of the Starobilsk agreement and called for the insurgents to prepare for a Bolshevik attack within the week. On 26 November, the Red Army launched a surprise attack against the Makhnovshchina, simultaneously arresting prominent anarchists, capturing the insurgent capital of Huliaipole and assassinating members of the insurgent staff.

The remaining insurgents managed to regroup, while the Red Army deployed all of its forces in Ukraine against them. But the Makhnovists continued to remain an ephemeral target, managing to break out of a number of encirclement attempts and waging a campaign of guerrilla warfare against the Red Army.

Under constant pursuit by the Red Army, the insurgents resolved to scatter their forces into small, easily maneuverable detachments. The Makhnovist core made its way to Galicia, before swinging around and heading back over the Dnieper and arriving in Poltava. After regrouping again, the insurgents launched an attempted offensive against the Ukrainian Bolshevik capital of Kharkiv, but this was unsuccessful and the insurgents suffered heavy losses.

=== Defeat, exile and underground activity ===
By the summer of 1921, the insurgents had largely been wiped out. With most prominent insurgent commanders killed or wounded, Makhno himself was eventually forced to retreat in order to have his wounds tended to, leaving Viktor Bilash in command of the core. Under constant pursuit by the Red cavalry, which caused many losses during their 1,000 kilometer journey, Makhno's small detachment retreated all the way to the Dniester, finally crossing over into Romania on 28 August. In exile, many of the Makhnovists found themselves drifting between a series of concentration camps and prisons. Leading figures of the Makhnovist movement, such as Volin, Peter Arshinov and Nestor Makhno himself, eventually ended up in Paris, where their exile continued up until their deaths. Bilash himself was unable to sustain the guerrilla war, with his detachment almost being wiped out in an ambush at Znamianka, after which Bilash was arrested and executed. Despite the defeat, the Makhnovist insurrection continued on underground throughout the 1920s, with some Makhnovists going on to fight against the Nazi occupation of Ukraine.

== Organisation ==
In mid-1919, the Revolutionary Insurgent Army of Ukraine had a strength of some 15,000 men, organised into one cavalry and four infantry Brigades, a machine gun regiment with 5000 guns, and an artillery detachment. At its peak in December 1919, it had about 83,000 infantry, 20,135 cavalry, 1,435 machine guns, and 118 guns, as well as seven armored trains and some armored cars. It was organized into four Corps and the strategic reserve. Each Corps had one infantry and one cavalry Brigade; each Brigade had 3–4 Regiments of the appropriate type.

The structure of the RIAU was not that of a traditional army. Instead, the RIAU was a democratic militia based on soldier committees and general assemblies. Officers in the ordinary sense were abolished; instead, all commanders were elected and recallable. Regular mass assemblies were held to discuss policy. The army was based on self-discipline, and all of the army's disciplinary rules were approved by soldier assemblies.

There is historical debate about whether the RIAU was an entirely voluntary militia or whether it relied on conscription. Paul Avrich argues that voluntary mobilisation was in reality conscription. Other historians have disagreed. Michael Malet points to surviving RIAU leaflets from 1920 which are appeals to join, not orders. After long debate, a regional congress decided to reject conscription and instead use moral persuasion. In other words, "compulsory mobilization" was rejected in favor of "obligatory mobilization", which meant that each able bodied man should recognize his obligation to join the RIAU. Leon Trotsky also declared that the RIAU was a voluntary militia, and seeing as Trotsky commanded the Red Army that eventually defeated the RIAU, he had no reason to lie in their favor. In Trotsky's words, "Makhno does not have general mobilisations, and indeed these would be impossible, as he lacks the necessary apparatus."

== Commanders ==
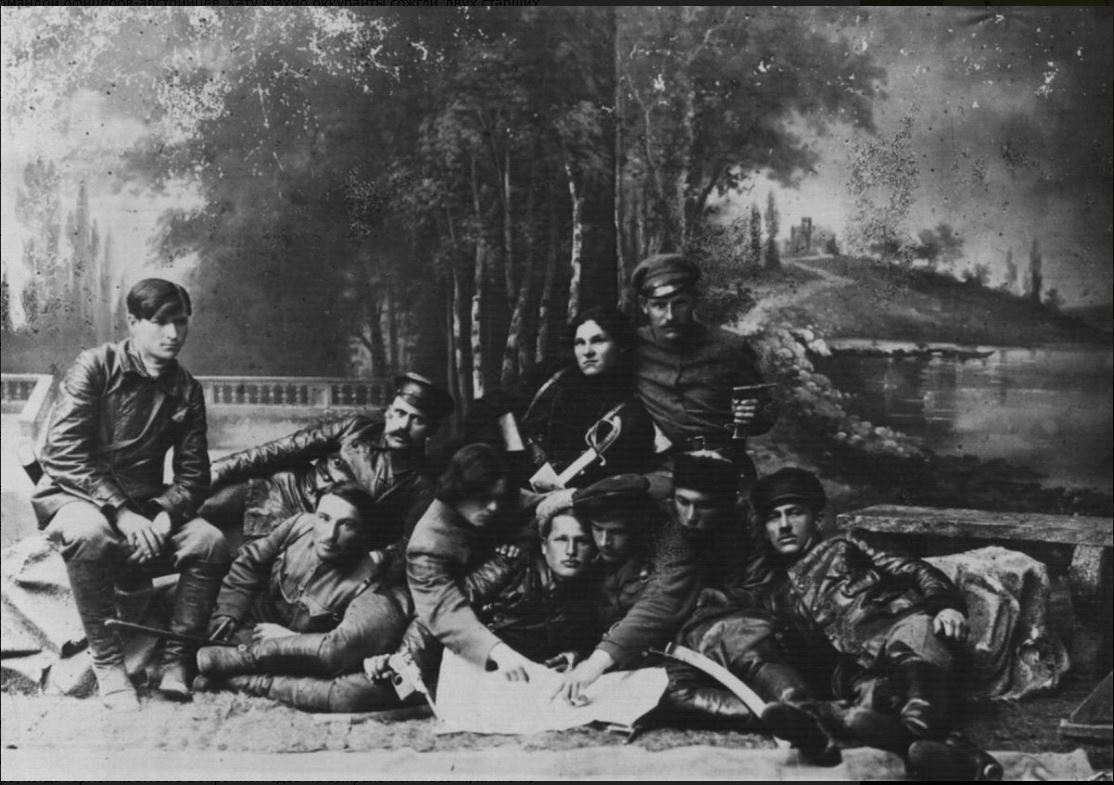
Nestor Makhno and his lieutenants in Berdiansk (1919).

Commander-in-chief:

- Nestor Makhno

Chief of staff:

- Viktor Bilash

Insurgent staff:

- Semen Karetnyk
- Petya Lyuty
- Fedir Shchus
- Oleksiy Marchenko
- Oleksiy Chubenko

Regimental commanders:

- Oleksandr Kalashnykov
- Vasyl Kurylenko

== See also ==
- Explosion in Leontievsky Lane – anarchist attack on Bolsheviks, 1919
- Green armies – Army/faction in the Russian Civil War
- Kontrrazvedka – counterintelligence division of the Revolutionary Insurgent Army of Ukraine
- Kronstadt rebellion – 1921 anti-Bolshevik revolt in Russia
- Pitchfork uprising, Russian Civil War peasant uprising led by the Army of the Black Eagle
- Tambov Rebellion – 1920–1922 peasant revolt in the Russian Civil War
- Ukrainian Insurgent Army – Ukrainian nationalist partisan organisation active during and after World War II

== Bibliography ==
- Avrich, Paul (1968). "Russian Anarchists and the Civil War". The Russian Review. 27 (3). Hoboken, New Jersey: Wiley-Blackwell: 296–306. doi:10.2307/127258. ISSN 0036-0341. JSTOR 127258. LCCN 43016148. OCLC 473067959.
- Avrich, Paul (1971) [1967]. The Russian Anarchists. Princeton: Princeton University Press. ISBN 0691007667. OCLC 1154930946.
- Avrich, Paul (1988). "Nestor Makhno: The Man and the Myth". Anarchist Portraits. Princeton: Princeton University Press. pp. 111–124. ISBN 978-0691047539. OCLC 17727270.
- Bilash, Oleksandr; Bilash, Viktor (1993). Дороги Нестора Махно (in Russian). Kiev: РВЦ "Проза". ISBN 978-5770738148. OCLC 429142607.
- Darch, Colin (2020). Nestor Makhno and Rural Anarchism in Ukraine, 1917–1921. London: Pluto Press. ISBN 978-0745338880.
- Eikhenbaum, Vsevolod M. (1974). "Part II: Ukraine (1918–1921)". The Unknown Revolution, 1917–1921. Vol. III: Struggle for the Real Social Revolution. Free Life Editions. ISBN 978-0914156079.
- Footman, David (1961). "Makhno". Civil War in Russia. Praeger Publications in Russian History and World Communism. Vol. 114. New York: Praeger. pp. 245–302. LCCN 62-17560. OCLC 254495418.
- Magocsi, Paul R. (1996). A History of Ukraine. Toronto: University of Toronto Press. ISBN 0802008305. OCLC 757049758.
- Malet, Michael (1982). Nestor Makhno in the Russian Civil War. London: Palgrave Macmillan. ISBN 978-0333259696. OCLC 8514426.
- Palij, Michael (1976). The Anarchism of Nestor Makhno, 1918–1921: An Aspect of the Ukrainian Revolution. Publications on Russia and Eastern Europe. Seattle: University of Washington Press. ISBN 978-0295955117. OCLC 81941010.
- Peters, Victor (1970). Nestor Makhno: The Life of an Anarchist. Winnipeg: Echo Books. OCLC 7925080.
- Shubin, Aleksandr (2010). "The Makhnovist Movement and the National Question in the Ukraine, 1917–1921". In Hirsch, Steven J.; van der Walt, Lucien (eds.). Anarchism and Syndicalism in the Colonial and Postcolonial World, 1870–1940. Studies in Global Social History. Vol. 6. Leiden: Brill. pp. 147–191. ISBN 978-9004188495. OCLC 868808983.
- Skirda, Alexandre (2004) [1982]. Nestor Makhno: Anarchy's Cossack. Translated by Sharkey, Paul. Edinburgh: AK Press. ISBN 1902593685. OCLC 58872511.
- Subtelny, Orest (1988). Ukraine: A History. Toronto: University of Toronto Press. ISBN 978-0802058089. OCLC 20722741.
- Yarmolinsky, Avrahm (2014) [1956]. Road to Revolution: A Century of Russian Radicalism. Princeton, New Jersey: Princeton University Press. ISBN 978-0691610412. OCLC 890439998.
