= Fedir Shchus =

Ukrainian anarchist and military commander (1893–1921)

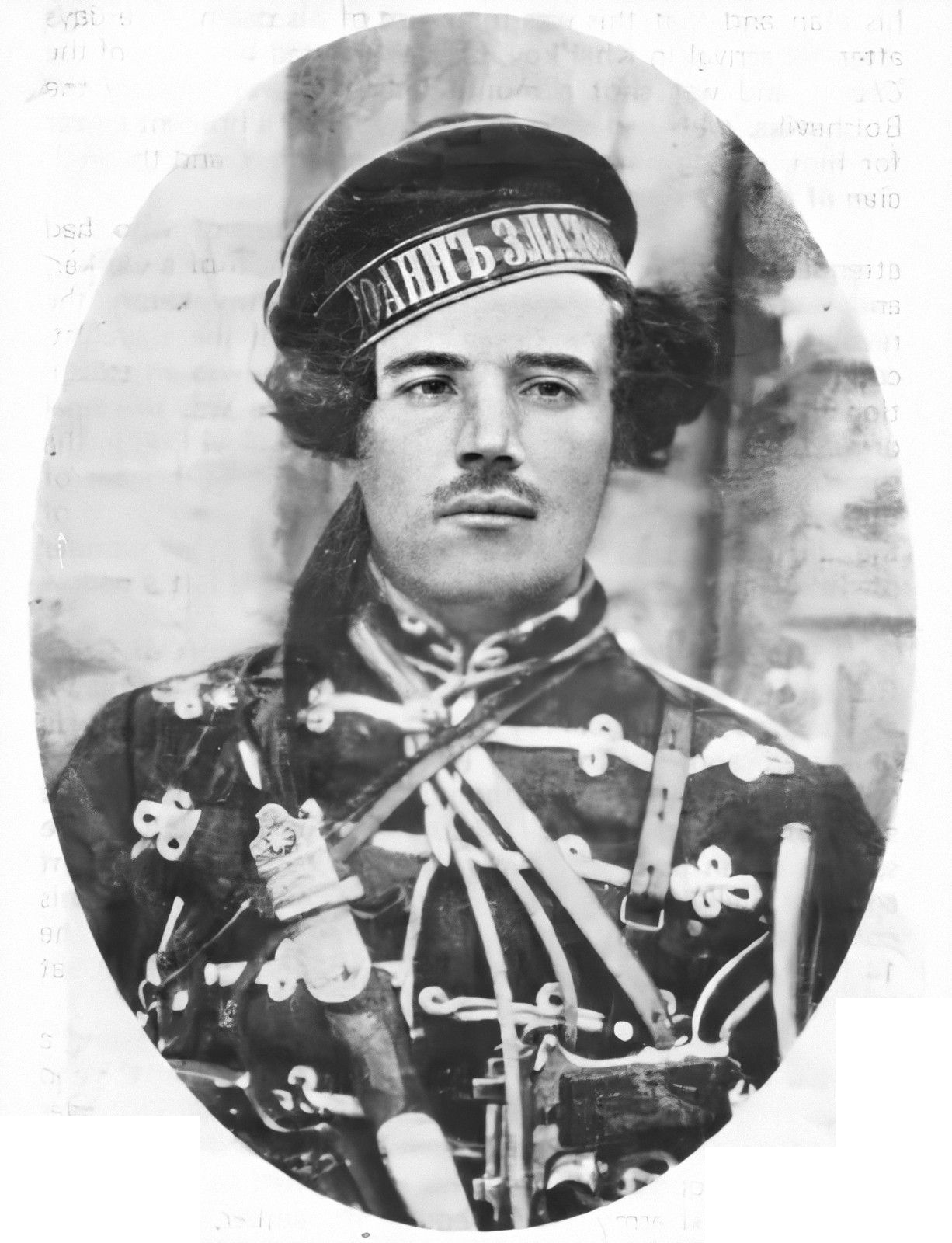
- Born: 25 March 1893; Dibrivka, Katerynoslav, Russian Empire
- Died: 30 June 1921 (aged 28) Nedryhailiv, Poltava, Ukrainian SSR
- Allegiance: Russian Empire (1915–1917); Makhnovshchina (1918–1921)
- Branch: Black Sea Fleet (1915–1917); Black Guards (1917–1918); Revolutionary Insurgent Army of Ukraine (1918–1921)
- Service years: 1915–1921
- Rank: Ataman
- Conflicts: First World War; Russian Civil War; Ukrainian War of Independence; Battle of Dibrivka; Battle for the Donbas; Battle of Peregonovka; Bolshevik–Makhnovist conflict †

Fedir Shchus (Ukrainian: Федір Щусь; 25 March 1893 – 30 June 1921), also spelled Fyodor Shuss, was a Ukrainian sailor in the Imperial Russian Navy and, later, ataman in the Revolutionary Insurgent Army of Ukraine during the Russian Civil War.

== Biography ==
Fedir Shchus was born into a poor peasant family in the small Ukrainian village of Dibrivka. In 1915 he was conscripted into the military service and enlisted in the navy as a seaman on the Ioann Zlatoust, a battleship in the Black Sea Fleet. He did a lot of sports in the Navy, was a champion in French boxing and wrestling, and knew jiu-jitsu well, he was able to defeat any opponent with a quick capture without much stress. He returned to his home town after the Revolution, where he established a partisan band known as the "Black Guards" in order to wage guerrilla warfare against the local nobility. Shchus believed that because of the abdication of Nicholas II, landowners no longer had any right to their lands, as the Tsarist legal system that upheld their private property no longer existed.

Following the invasion of Ukraine by the Central Powers in April 1918, Shchus attended an insurgent congress at Taganrog, where it was decided that they would regroup in the Huliaipole Raion and go on the offensive against the Ukrainian State and the occupation forces. After the conference, he returned to wage guerrilla warfare against the occupation, harrying the occupation forces and carrying out punitive expeditions against Ukrainian collaborators. In July 1918, Shchus was defeated by the forces of the Austro-Hungarian Army that were occupying Dibrivka, forcing him to retreat into the region's dense forests to regroup.

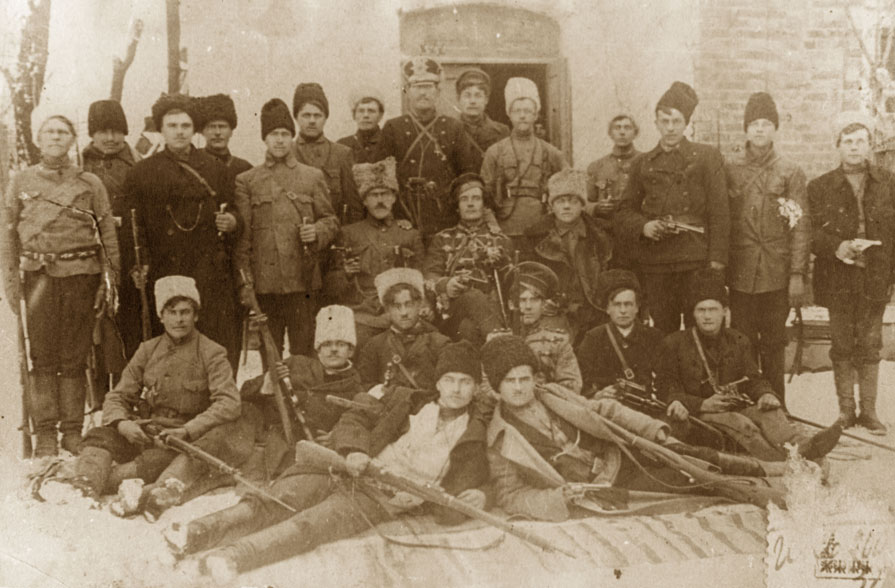
Fedir Shchus (center) with the Dibrivka detachment of the Revolutionary Insurgent Army of Ukraine

Following his return to Ukraine from Russia, the anarchist revolutionary Nestor Makhno joined forces with Shchus, making common cause against the forces of the Central Powers. The local landowners and kulaks responded by notifying the Austro-Hungarian Army and encircling the dozens-strong partisan detachment in Dibrivka. In a surprise attack against the Austrian forces, Shchus led half a dozen men in a flanking attack on the town's market square, forcing the Austrians to retreat from the village. With the success of their assault, Shchus and the rest of the detachment greeted Makhno as their Bat'ko. Soon after, Shchus joined Makhno in infiltrating a meeting between Austrian officers and supporters of the White movement, during which they killed everyone involved by throwing a grenade into the room.

On 5 October, the Austrian forces counterattacked, occupying Dibrivka after levelling it with artillery and driving a wounded Shchus out of the town. On 15 November, the retreating insurgents were pinned down at Temyrivka, where Shchus was shot in his legs before they managed to escape.

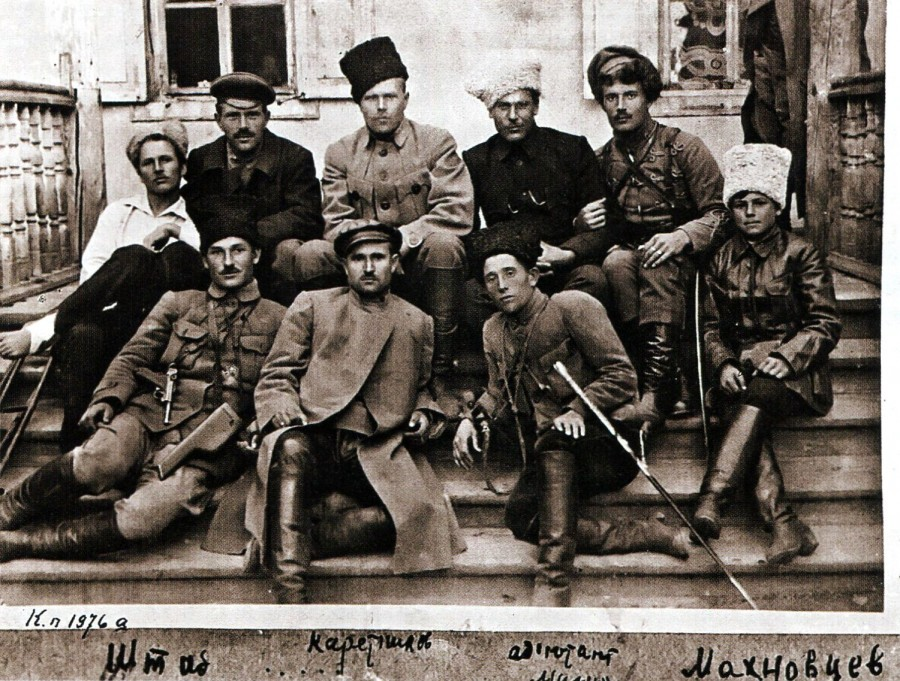
Fedir Shchus (top-right) with other members of the insurgent general staff

Shchus' tendency to embark on unjustified raids brought him under close watch, with one of his best friends being shot for imposing levies on peasant property. After some conflict between Makhno and Shchus, due to the latter's banditry in the region, the first Regional Congress of Peasants, Workers and Insurgents confirmed Makhno as commander-in-chief over smaller atamans like Shchus, who was elected to the Insurgent Army's general staff.

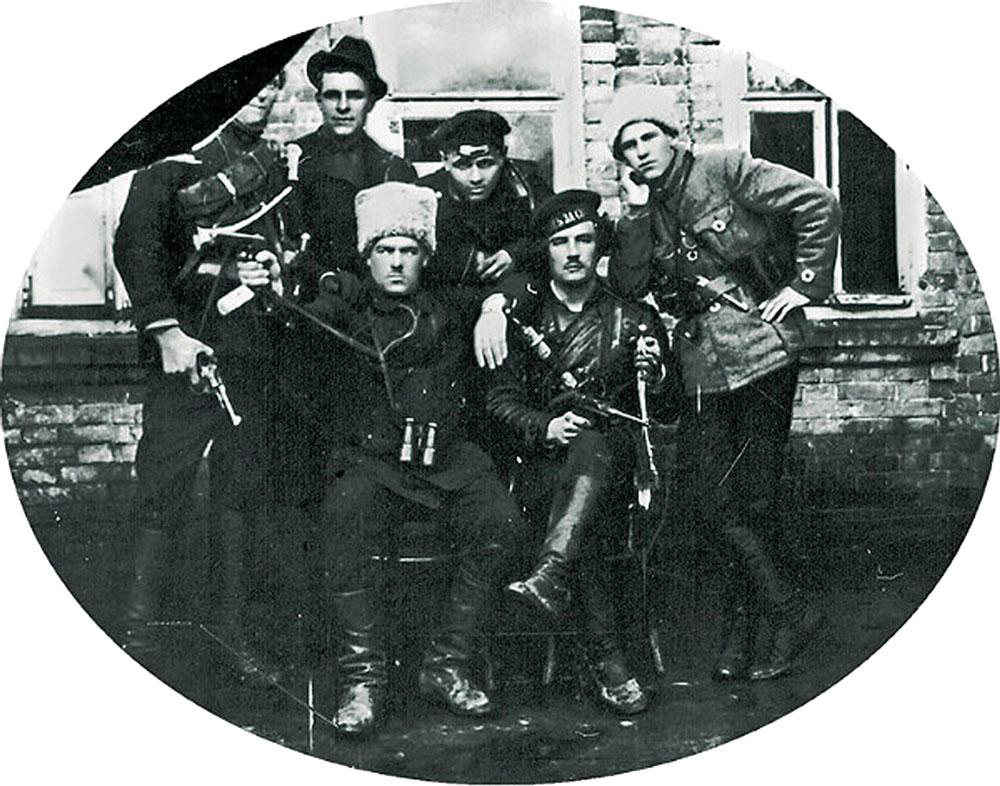
Fedir Shchus (second from the right), with other members of the insurgent general staff

Following the collapse of the insurgents' alliance with the Bolsheviks, on 24 June 1919, Shchus led a 250-strong detachment in a retreat over the Dnieper. Having fallen back to right-bank Ukraine, the insurgents linked up with Nykyfor Hryhoriv's green army in Sentovo, where Hryhoriv himself was assassinated and his forces integrated into the Insurgent Army. During the subsequent reorganization of the insurgent forces, Shchus was placed in command of the cavalry brigade, which numbered roughly 2,000 people. Following the battle of Peregonovka, Shchus led his cavalry in the insurgent occupation of Oleksandrivsk from September to November 1919.

By March 1921, Shchus was still leading a partisan group, albeit smaller and disconnected from others, and in May 1921, rendezvoused with other insurgents in Poltava. But by this time, the Makhnovists had been militarily defeated, leaving Shchus badly wounded. In June 1921, Shchus was killed in an engagement with the Red Army.

== See also ==
- Anarchism in Ukraine

== Bibliography ==
- Darch, Colin (2020). Nestor Makhno and Rural Anarchism in Ukraine, 1917–1921. London: Pluto Press. ISBN 978-0-7453-3888-0.
- Malet, Michael (1982). Nestor Makhno in the Russian Civil War. London: Palgrave Macmillan. ISBN 978-0-333-25969-6. OCLC 8514426.
- Peters, Victor (1970). Nestor Makhno: The Life of an Anarchist. Winnipeg: Echo Books. OCLC 7925080.
- Skirda, Alexandre (2004) [1982]. Nestor Makhno: Anarchy's Cossack. Translated by Sharkey, Paul. Edinburgh: AK Press. ISBN 1-902593-68-5. OCLC 58872511.
