= Velykomykhailivka =

Velykomykhailivka Великомихайлівка
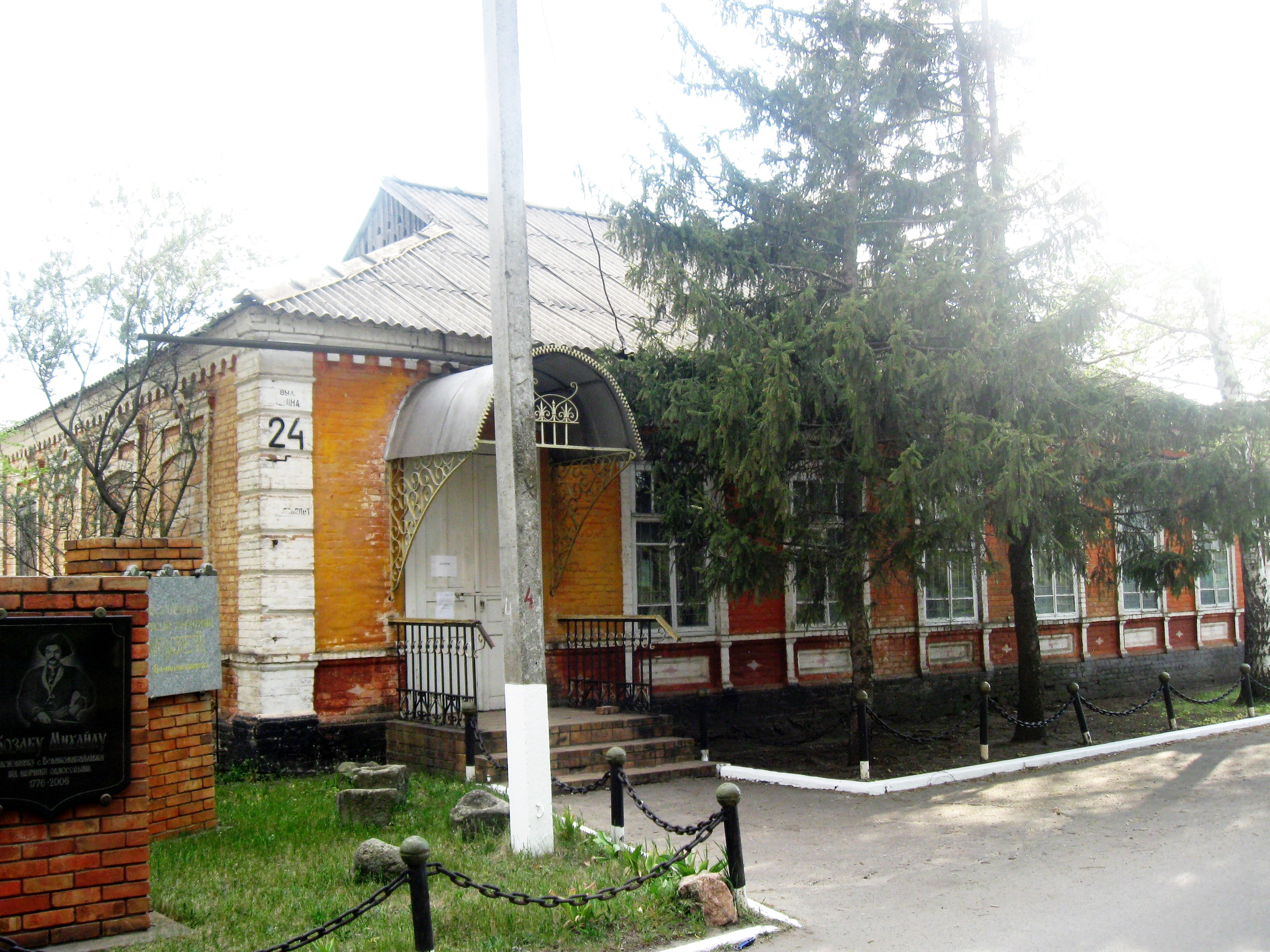

- Location within Dnipropetrovsk Oblast Location within Ukraine
- Coordinates: 47°58′19.12″N 36°28′20.37″E
- Country: Ukraine
- Oblast: Dnipropetrovsk
- Raion: Synelnykove
- Hromada: Velykomykhailivka rural hromada
- Established: 1776
- Founder: Vasily Chertkov

Government
  - Mayor: Serhiy Degtyarev

Area
  - Total: 5.305 km^{2} (2.048 sq mi)
- Elevation: 113 m (371 ft)

Population (2001)
  - Total: 1,963
  - Density: 370.0/km^{2} (958.4/sq mi)
- Postal code: 53621
- Area code: +380 5638

Velykomykhailivka (Ukrainian: Великомихайлівка) is a Ukrainian village in the Synelnykove Raion of Dnipropetrovsk Oblast. It is located on the right bank of the Vovcha River.

It is the administrative center of the Velykomykhailivsky village council, which, in addition, includes the villages of Vorone, Lisne, Malyivka, Novoselivka, Orestopil, Sosnivka, Khoroshe and Yanvarske.

== Etymology ==
Velykomykhailivka is named after the first Zimchan Cossack. Since there were two villages named Mikhailivka, the larger one became known as Velykomykhailivka, and the smaller one became Malayamykhailivka. Local people also called the town Dibrivka, after the oak forests that surrounded it.

== History ==
The burial mounds located to the south and north of Velykomykhailivka testify to the settlement of this area during the Bronze Age.

During the time of the New Sich (1734-1776) the village was used as winter quarters by the Zaporozhian Cossacks. In 1776, the governor of Azov, Vasily Chertkov, replaced them with the state military settlement of Mykhailivka. In 1779, it had 175 households. Before the abolition of serfdom in 1861, Velykomykhailivka had 652 households, 3,828 inhabitants, a school, and two markets.

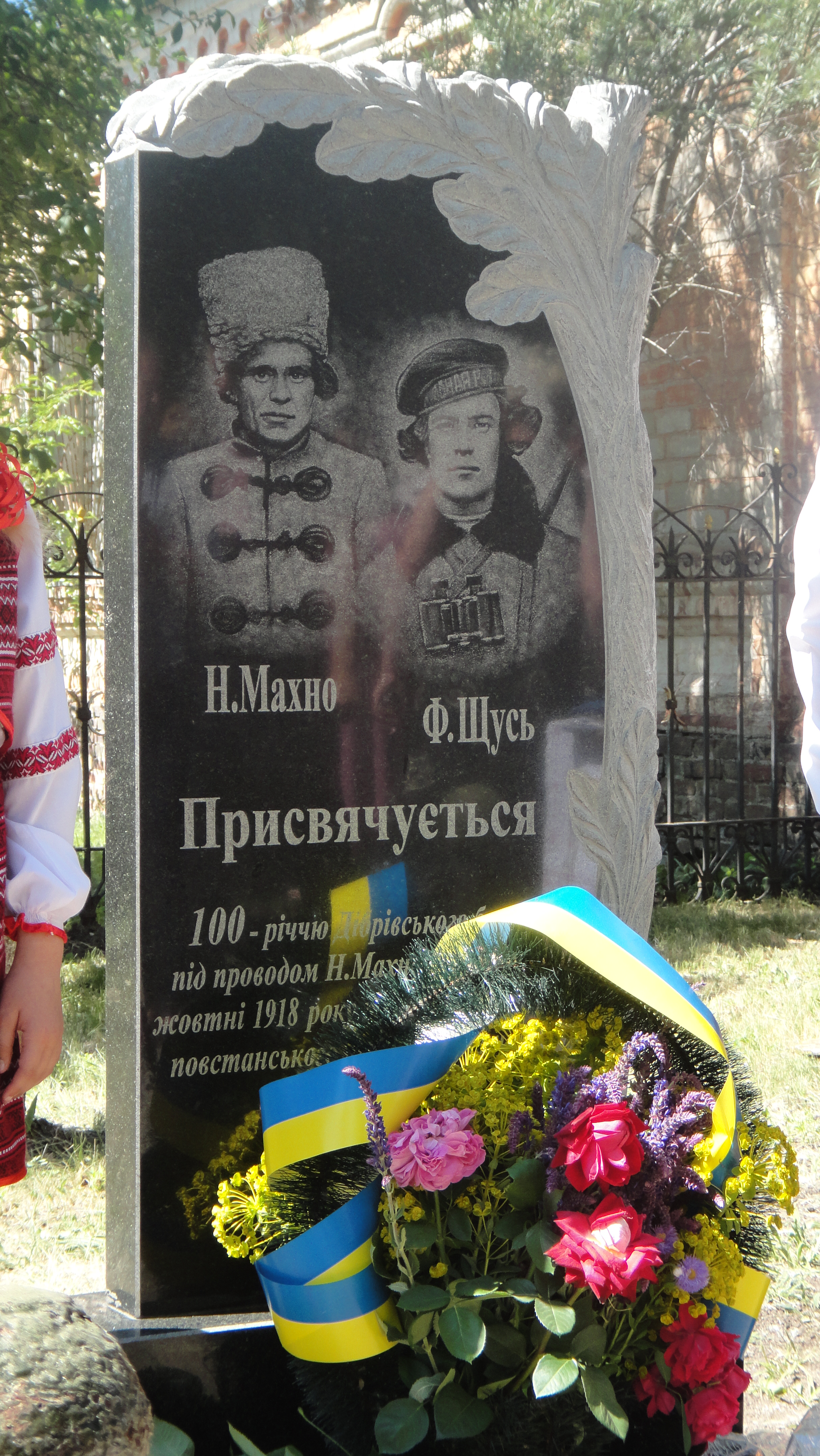
Memorial to Nestor Makhno and Fedir Shchus commemorating the 100th anniversary of the Battle of Dibrivka

In 1913, Velykomykhailivka had 1059 households, 5 schools, a medical and veterinary hospital, a post office, a brick and tile factory, three steam mills, two steam oil mills, a warehouse for agricultural implements and a telephone exchange. In 1918, Velykomykhailivka was the site of the Battle of Dibrivka, during which the insurgent forces led by Nestor Makhno and Fedir Shchus defeated the Austro-Hungarian Army in battle.

After the establishment of the Ukrainian Soviet Socialist Republic, Velykomykhailivka was blacklisted by the Bolsheviks. As a result, the village suffered from famines in 1921 and in 1932, reducing the population by a half.

During World War II, Velykomykhailivka was liberated by units of the Soviet 1164th and 1168th rifle regiments. The Nazi German forces attempted to keep the village. On the night of 13–14 September 1943, artillery and tanks were brought up to the village. The battle began on the morning of 14 September and lasted about three hours. When the Nazi German invaders retreated, they left behind their dead, weapons, equipment, ammunition.

During the Russo-Ukrainian war (2022–present), the front line reached the village in late 2025 and it has suffered numerous attacks by the Russian army.

== Notable people ==
- Oleksiy Lapko - Teacher, local historian, museologist and historian of the Makhnovist movement;
- Kilina Lopatka - Hero of Socialist Labour;
- Petro Petrenko - Commander in the Revolutionary Insurgent Army of Ukraine;
- Fedir Shchus - Cavalry commander in the Revolutionary Insurgent Army of Ukraine;
- Oleksandr Shtepenko - Hero of the Soviet Union, three times awarded the Order of Lenin, three times the Order of the Red Banner;
- Volodimir Volchkov - writer, professor of physical, mathematical and economic sciences;
- Tetiana Zaytseva - linguist, professor of Philosophical Sciences;
- Dmytro Zaytsiv - entomologist.
