= Alexander Schapiro =

Russian anarchist

- Born: 1882 or 1883; Rostov-on-Don, Russia
- Died: December 5, 1946 (aged 64); New York City, U.S.
- Known for: Anarcho-syndicalism, participation in the Russian Revolution

Alexander "Sanya" Moiseyevich Schapiro or Shapiro (Russian: Александр "Саня" Моисеевич Шапиро; 1882 or 1883 – December 5, 1946) was a Russian anarcho-syndicalist activist. Born in southern Russia, Schapiro left Russia at an early age and spent most of his early activist years in London.

During the Russian Revolution, Schapiro returned to Russia and aided the Bolsheviks in their seizure of power during the October Revolution. Following the Russian Civil War and the Kronstandt Uprising, anarchists were suppressed in the Soviet Union, and Schapiro escaped to Western Europe, eventually settling in New York City. Schapiro lived in exile for the remainder of his life.

Schapiro associated with many other prominent anarchists throughout his life, including Emma Goldman, Alexander Berkman, and Peter Kropotkin. When Kropotkin died, Schapiro was one of the organizers of his funeral. Schapiro collaborated with Goldman and Berkman on anarchist pamphlets denouncing the Soviet state for its authoritarianism and suppression of anarchism.

== Early life ==
Alexander Schapiro was born in 1882 or 1883 in Rostov-on-Don in southern Russia. He grew up in Constantinople because his father Moses, a member of the secret revolutionary organization Narodnaya Volya, which assassinated Tsar Alexander II in 1881, was forced to flee the Russian Empire. There, he attended the French school. Schapiro grew up speaking Yiddish, Russian, French, and Turkish, and would later learn German and English. In the mid-1890s, Moses Schapiro converted to anarchism and by age eleven Alexander Schapiro started studying the works of anarchist theorists like Peter Kropotkin, Jean Grave and Élisée Reclus. In the late 1890s, the Schapiro family moved to London and came into contact with the milieu of Jewish anarchists behind the journal Arbeyter Fraynd. After finishing school, Schapiro moved to Sofia, Bulgaria in 1899 to study mathematics and physics.

In August 1900, he moved to Paris to attend the Sorbonne and possibly to participate in an international anarchist congress, which in the end was banned by the authorities. He started studying either engineering or biology with the intention of embarking on a career in medicine, but was forced to drop out for financial reasons. In Paris, he came to know many of the city's leading anarchists and became a member of Étudiants socialistes révolutionnaires internationalistes, an anarcho-syndicalist group involved in the preparations for the banned international congress. Syndicalism was an international movement which first emerged in France and the General Confederation of Labor and then spread to many other countries. The movement fought for a revolution to abolish the state and capitalism and conceived of this revolution as being based on the general strike.

== London ==
In 1900 or 1901, at Kropotkin's suggestion, Schapiro moved to London. Like his father, he became an active member of London's anarchist movement. At the time the movement was predominantly Russian Jewish. Its leading figure was Rudolf Rocker, a non-Jewish German exile, but the city's best-known anarchist was Kropotkin. In London, Schapiro worked as an assistant for the physiologist Augustus Waller, the inventor of the electocardiagram. Schapiro is listed as an author on several publications from Waller's lab, but the job also allowed him to devote a lot of his time to the anarchist movement.

Schapiro was a member of the Worker's Friend Group. The collective was split on the question of participation in trade unions. Schapiro was opposed because he feared anarchist principles could be compromised by unionism. According to Sam Dreen, another member, he was intelligent and capable, but also a stubborn and overbearing intellectual who was not in touch with workers' issues. Fermin Rocker, the son of Rudolf Rocker, another member of Arbeter Fraynd, liked Schapiro and considered him well-educated and intelligent, but dogmatic, intolerant, and self-important.

Schapiro was also a member of the Jewish Anarchist Federation, a group of Eastern European anarchist immigrants. He was in charge of the federation's Jubilee Street Club, which was established in 1906. It was mostly a library and a center for adult education where workers could learn about art and the humanities. The club used Yiddish but it was open to all workers. It became a forum for workers, anarchists, and socialists of different nationalities and political views and introduced many people to the world of the labor movement and politics. In 1906 and 1907, Schapiro helped publish Listki Chleb i Volja, a series of pamphlets written by Kropotkin. In the years after the Russian Revolution of 1905, Russian anarchists were the targets of severe government repression. Hundreds were executed or sentenced to long prison terms and many fled to the West. In 1907, anarchist exiles established the Anarchist Red Cross to protest the Russian Empire's treatment of anarchists and in order to help imprisoned activists. It was headquartered in London and New York and had branches in several European and North American cities. It organized lectures and collected money and clothing for Russian prisoners. Along with Kropotkin, Varlam Cherkezov, and Rocker, Schapiro directed the London headquarters.

In August 1907, Schapiro was the delegate of the Jewish Anarchist Federation at the International Anarchist Congress in Amsterdam, the largest anarchist meeting ever, and one of the organizers of the event. Syndicalism was one of the main points of discussion. The French anarchist Pierre Monatte was the primary advocate of syndicalism, while the Italian Errico Malatesta criticized it. The congress helped form links between syndicalists in various countries and spread the movement. The congress decided to form an International Bureau which also became known as the Anarchist International. Schapiro, Rocker, and Malatesta were chosen as the bureau's secretaries. Schapiro became the editor of the Bureau's journal, the Bulletin de l'Internationale Anarchiste, which he published in French from London until 1910. The Bulletin disseminated information about anarchist and syndicalist movements between countries. For about a year, it appeared almost every month, but then died off slowly. Schapiro wrote that the lack of enthusiasm of the international anarchist movement for the Anarchist International and the Bulletin was due to "the fear that organisation might be the way whereby centralisation and authoritarianism could sneak into the anarchist movement". Rocker praised the patience, intelligence, and talent Schapiro exhibited in his work for the Anarchist International. In 1909, Schapiro, Rocker, Malatesta, and John Turner repeatedly called for a follow-up congress, but their calls received no replies. A second congress was finally planned to take place in London in August 1914. Schapiro was heavily involved in the preparations and published a bulletin to facilitate communication in the run-up to the congress. It focused on anti-militarism, syndicalism, and organizational questions. Anarchists from several countries pledged to attend and Schapiro was optimistic the congress would be a success. However, after World War I broke out, it had to be canceled.

Schapiro took part in the First International Syndicalist Congress in London in 1913. He did not represent any organization, but was one of two translators, with Christiaan Cornelissen the other. The German delegates praised Schapiro's objective approach, while Alfred Rosmer deemed him the only participant who did not lose his poise. There were numerous disputes at the congress, but it ultimately passed a Declaration of Syndicalist Principles calling for the abolition of the state and capitalism.

By the time World War I broke out, Schapiro was an important organizer in the international anarchist movement, although he was never as well-known an activist as the likes of Emma Goldman or Alexander Berkman as he was usually preoccupied with behind-the-scenes work for the movement. The outbreak of war became an incisive moment for the international anarchist movement and the broader radical left. The milieu of anarchist exiles in London was divided by the war. Several anarchists supported their respective home nations in the war. In October 1914, Kropotkin declared his support for the Allies. He argued that German militarism was to blame for the war, that Germany was the primary supporter of reaction in Europe, that France and Belgium had to be freed from German attack, and that the German working class was as bad as the German ruling class. Kropotkin's views put him in the minority in the anarchist movement, although Cherkesov, the French anarchist Jean Grave, and the American Benjamin Tucker agreed with him. The question split the movement. Schapiro was immediately and sternly opposed to the war. In the fall, Schapiro, Malatesta, Rocker, and others who opposed the war debated the issue with Cherkesov who presented Kropotkin's views. In March 1915, about 40 anarchists, including Schapiro, Malatesta, and the Americans Emma Goldman and Alexander Berkman signed the International Anarchist Manifesto on the War. The manifesto denounces the war as "the most frightful butchery that history has ever recorded" and a consequence of capitalism's drive for profit and power. Anarchists' role, according to the signatories, "is to summon the slaves to revolt against the masters" and they therefore have no business rooting for one side or the other. The pro-war side in the anarchist debate responded with a manifesto of its own, the Manifesto of the Sixteen, which was mostly written by Kropotkin. It was also signed by Cherkezov, Grave, Cornelissen and several others and argues that opposition to the war only served to weaken the Allies.

Most anarchists broke with Kropotkin over his views on the war. Schapiro and Rocker were among the few who maintained their friendship with him. Rocker, however, was interned as enemy alien in December 1914. Schapiro became the editor of the Arbeter Fraynd journal and worked with Rocker's partner Milly Witkop to keep it running. In 1916, Witkop was also interned, Schapiro was imprisoned for his opposition to the war, and the journal was shut down by the authorities. After Schapiro's release and the February Revolution in Russia, he campaigned for Russian exiles being allowed to return to their home country. He was a member of a committee headed by Georgy Chicherin, the later Soviet People's Commissar for Foreign Affairs.

== Russia ==
=== Revolution ===
Schapiro returned to Russia, arriving in Petrograd on May 31, 1917. He was one of several anarcho-syndicalists returning from exile including Vladimir Shatov, Maksim Raevskii, and Volin. The three had been on the editorial board of the syndicalist journal Golos Truda (Voice of Labor), the organ of the Union of Russian Workers of the United States and Canada. They brought the journal with them back to Russia. The syndicalists formed the Union of Anarcho-Syndicalist Propaganda and Golos Truda became its mouthpiece. Schapiro joined the editorial staff of Golos Truda. The journal began appearing in August 1917. It published articles on French syndicalism and the theory of the general strike. Schapiro was the driving force behind Golos Trudas's publishing house, which released Russian translations of works by Western syndicalist theorists like Fernand Pelloutier, Émile Pouget, or Cornelissen. The group sought the abolition of the state and its replacement by a federation of "peasant unions, industrial unions, factory committees, control commissions, and the like in the localities all over the country." It supported the soviets emerging in the revolutionary process, but was most excited about the factory committees, which arose after the February Revolution as vehicles of workers' control over production. Golos Truda considered these committees "the cells of the future socialist society". In an article in Golos Truda in September, Schapiro called for "complete decentralization and the very broadest self-direction of local organizations" to keep the soviets from becoming a new form of political coercion. In another article, Schapiro criticized the upcoming elections of the Constituent Assembly, calling for "the abolition of all power, which only impedes and smothers revolutionary creativity" and criticizing the idea that parliaments can create a free society.

During the Provisional Government, there was some convergence between Lenin and the Bolsheviks on the one side and anarchists on the other, as both called for the government's removal and several radical statements by Lenin led anarchists to believe he had adopted their views on revolutionary struggle. Yet, when the Bolsheviks gained majorities in the Petrograd and Moscow Soviets, the anarchists, including Schapiro, became apprehensive. The Petrograd Military Revolutionary Committee, was dominated by Bolsheviks, but also included four anarchists, Shatov among them. On October 25, it overthrew the Provisional Government, the event that became known as the October Revolution. Elated by the revolution, Golos Truda was also pleased when the Bolsheviks mandated workers' control in all enterprises with at least five employees in November, but control over factories was soon transferred to the state after workers' control led to economic chaos.

The 1918–1921 Civil War split the anarchist movement. Most syndicalists viewed the Bolshevik government as the lesser evil, because they feared a White Army victory. Details on Schapiro's activities are scarce, but he collaborated more openly with the Bolshevik government than most syndicalists. He worked for the Commissariat of Jewish Affairs, part of the Commissariat of Foreign Affairs, which was headed by Chicherin whom Schapiro had come to know in London. For the Commissariat, he produced Yiddish periodicals that promoted the Revolution but were not specifically Bolshevik. By 1920, he was working as a translator for the Commissariat of Foreign Affairs. At one point he held a high post in the Moscow rail workers' labor union. While he worked for the Bolshevik regime, Schapiro continued to criticize it, in a measured way according to both supporters and critics of Bolshevik rule.

=== Suppression ===
In 1918, the Bolshevik government initiated a wave of repression towards the anarchist movement. In May, Golos Truda was shut down. Schapiro turned his attention to pushing back against this repression and helping anarchist prisoners. In 1920, syndicalists from several western countries came to Moscow to attend the second congress of the Comintern. They knew little about conditions in Russia. While in Moscow, several syndicalists including Augustin Souchy, Ángel Pestaña, Armando Borghi, and Bertho Lepetit visited anarchists like Emma Goldman, Alexander Berkman, both of them Russian-born anarchists who returned from the United States in 1919, Kropotkin, who had also returned to Russia, and Schapiro. Schapiro relayed to them Russian syndicalists' critique of the regime and their fears of persecution. Some of those syndicalists then raised these issues with the Bolshevik leadership. After the congress, Alfred Rosmer, a French syndicalist who became a communist and a member of the Executive of the Comintern, stayed in Russia. Rosmer contacted Schapiro and met him at the Golos Truda printing house. The Russian syndicalists had written a letter of protest and hoped it would receive attention if Rosmer submitted it to the Comintern. Rosmer and Schapiro discussed the issue and Rosmer was optimistic it could be resolved. The defiant tone of the letter the Russian syndicalists then drew up surprised Rosmer and he refused to submit their declaration unless they softened it. Eventually, Shapiro and Grigorii Maksimov, another member of Golos Truda, rewrote the letter and Rosmer submitted it in February 1921. They never received a reply, as the Kronstadt uprising put an end to attempts at reconciliation between the Bolshevik leadership and the anarchist movement.

Schapiro, like several other anarchists, had regularly visited Kropotkin. While carefully avoiding the question of the war, they had long discussions on the situation in Russia. In January 1921, Kropotkin, almost eighty years old and living in Dmitrov, a suburb of Moscow, contracted pneumonia. Schapiro, with Goldman and Nikolai Ivanovich Pavlov, took a train to visit him, but their train was delayed and they arrived an hour after he died on February 8. Schapiro and Berkman were part of a commission formed by the country's anarchist groups to organize Kropotkin's funeral. The funeral drew 20,000 anarchists and was the last anarchist demonstration in communist Russia.

In early 1921, the government started to ban syndicalist and anarchist writings. After the Kronstadt uprising in March, the Bolshevik government began rounding up anarchists. Schapiro's critique of the regime, which had been fairly moderate, turned into fundamental opposition. In May, Schapiro was one of several signatories to an open letter to Lenin and the Bolshevik leadership circulated in the West. It protested the persecution of Russian anarchists in the wake of Kronstadt. In June 1921, Schapiro, along with Goldman, Berkman, and fellow anarchist Alexei Borovoi, anonymously wrote a pamphlet entitled The Russian Revolution and the Communist Party, which was smuggled to Germany and published by Rocker. They argued that anarchists had refrained from protesting the repression leveled against them in Russia as long as the Civil War was being fought so as not "to aid the common enemy, world imperialism". The end of the war, however, had made it clear that the biggest threat to the revolution "was not outside, but within the country: a danger resulting from the very nature of the social and economic arrangements which characterize the present 'transitory stage'."

Although wary of the persecution of syndicalists in Russia, representatives of syndicalist organizations from several Western countries attended the founding congress of the Red International of Labor Unions (RILU), which the Bolsheviks convened in July 1921. Disputes between syndicalists and communists over tactical issues dominated the congress. The Bolshevik suppression of the anarchist movement also became an issue. The day before the congress began, thirteen imprisoned Russian anarchists entered a hunger strike. Goldman, Berkman, the anarchist-turned-Bolshevik Victor Serge, and above all Schapiro made sure that the visiting syndicalists were apprised of the imprisonment of anarchists and the hunger strike. The foreign syndicalists raised the issue with the head of the Cheka, Felix Dzerzhinsky, and with Lenin himself. Finally, negotiations in which Schapiro, Berkman, two Spanish delegates, and two French delegates represented the syndicalist side yielded a compromise with the Bolshevik leadership. The anarchist prisoners would end their hunger strike, be released, and leave the country. They remained imprisoned until September, when they were released and allowed to emigrate to Germany by the end of the year. Among them were Maksimov, Volin, Mark Mrachnyi, and Efim Yarchuk who had all worked with Schapiro in the Golos Truda group. While the negotiations were still ongoing, Nikolai Bukharin addressed the RILU congress in the name of the Bolshevik Party and attacked the Russian anarchist movement. This caused the congress to erupt into chaotic shouting. The French syndicalist Henri Sirolle then responded for the syndicalist delegates and defended Russian anarchism. He demanded that a representative of the Russian syndicalist movement who was present, most likely Schapiro, be allowed to address the congress, but he was denied. After the congress, Schapiro denounced the RILU as "the illegitimate daughter of the Communist International, and consequently the handmaiden of the Russian Communist Party" and warned Italian syndicalists against associating with it.

In November 1921, Schapiro, Berkman, and Goldman received permission from the Soviet government to attend an international anarchist congress in Berlin in December. They were held up in Latvia when the visa for Germany they had been promised was not issued. Goldman suspected the Bolsheviks were behind this, but this is unlikely. The American government had circulated photos Schapiro, Berkman, and Goldman to its foreign embassies, as it was concerned that Goldman might try to return to the United States. With them having already missed the congress, Sweden issued the trio visas two weeks later, but on the train on their way to Stockholm the Latvian police arrested them. Their belongings were searched and they were jailed for a week. This was engineered by the American commissioner in Riga who was then able to search the anarchists' belongings and make copies of all documents the American government might be interested in. Schapiro, Berkman, and Goldman were released and able to leave Latvia for Sweden on December 30. Their status in Sweden was precarious and they were only allowed to stay as long as they pledged not to participate in anarchist activities. While Berkman and Goldman remained in Stockholm and wrote about their experiences in Russia, Schapiro decided to join the Russian syndicalist exiles in Berlin after entering Germany secretly.

In June 1922, he attended a syndicalist conference in Berlin. The meeting was called to discuss the international organization of the movement and whether to negotiate with the RILU or start an independent syndicalist international. Schapiro and Mrachnyi represented the Russian syndicalist movement, but a representative of Russia's centralist unions also attended. Schapiro and Mrachnyi used the meeting as another opportunity to denounce the Soviet government's repression of syndicalists and anarchists. The meeting decided to create an international Syndicalist Bureau, to which Schapiro would be the Russian representative, and discussed the position the syndicalist movement should take on the RILU. Concerning negotiations with the RILU, Schapiro presented the congress with two options. Syndicalists could present the Bolsheviks with minimal conditions, which they might accept, or harsher conditions, which they could not. The former he deemed a betrayal of syndicalist principles and the latter a mere ploy. Instead, he proposed that the syndicalists break off negotiations with the RILU and go their own way. The assembly adopted a resolution which made no mention of negotiations with the RILU. This was the end of collaboration between the syndicalist and the communist movements in most countries. In its stead, the conference formed a Syndicalist Bureau, in which Schapiro represented Russia, to prepare a second conference at which a syndicalist international was to be formed.

After the meeting Schapiro decided to return to Russia, feeling he could make a contribution there. He contacted Chicherin and received assurances he could safely return to Russia. However, on the night of September 2–3, two weeks after Schapiro's return to Russia, he was arrested in Moscow. The secret police charged him with working with underground anarchists, but was mostly interested in his international contacts. Chicherin ignored a letter Schapiro sent him from prison and the RILU refused to notify the Syndicalist Bureau of his arrest. Nevertheless, the news soon reached the West and sparked an international solidarity campaign to free Schapiro. After Western syndicalists, particularly the French CGTU, protested his incarceration, the Soviet government became worried about damaging the RILU's relations with them. Schapiro was released and, charged with anti-Soviet activities, expelled from Russia in October 1922, on the anniversary of the October Revolution. Schapiro himself sarcastically called this coincidence an "exceptional honour". He subsequently wrote about his imprisonment in several syndicalist journals in the West.

== Exile ==
Schapiro decided to return to Berlin. He became one of the most active Russian syndicalist exiles. In December 1922, at conference in Berlin, he participated in the establishment of the anarcho-syndicalist International Working Men's Association (IWMA). Schapiro and Efim Iarchuk, another former editor of Golos Truda, represented the Russian syndicalist movement. Reflections on the Russian Revolution played a central role in the deliberations, as the Russian experience demonstrated the fundamental differences between syndicalism and state socialism, according to the delegates. Rocker pointed to the Bolshevik government's treatment of Schapiro in making the case against participation in the RILU and for the formation of a syndicalist international. Schapiro himself argued that participation in the RILU would be incompatible with syndicalist principles. The establishment of the IWMA finalized the international syndicalist movement's break with Bolshevism. Berlin was selected as the seat of the IWMA. Schapiro, Souchy, and Rocker were elected to its secretariat. Within a few years, the IWMA consisted of union federations in Germany, Italy, Sweden, Spain, Norway, Portugal, the Netherlands, France, Argentina, and Mexico as well as minor affiliates in numerous other countries. Schapiro considered the IWMA more important than did the other members of the secretariat who mainly thought of it as a response to both Bolshevism and reformism. He viewed the IWMA as the continuation of the efforts to unite the international syndicalist movement that had begun before World War I and performed most of the secretariat's work during the organization's first year. He hoped discussions within the IWMA would lead to unity among syndicalists on questions concerning revolutionary tactics and strategy. He later found that the IWMA frequently had to mediate between contradictory understandings of anarcho-syndicalism.

From 1923, Schapiro served on the Joint Committee for the Defense of the Revolutionaries Imprisoned in Russia and then on the IWMA's Relief Fund for Anarchists and Anarcho-Syndicalists Imprisoned in Russia. They sent numerous aid packages and letters of encouragement to anarchists in prisons and gulags in the Soviet Union. Schapiro and a group of exiles that also included Maksimov edited the anarcho-syndicalist newspaper Rabochii Put' (The Workers' Way), the IWMA's Russian-language organ. It was printed on the presses of the German syndicalist journal Der Syndikalist with financial support from the IWMA and secretly distributed in Russia. It ran for six issues from March to August 1923. Schapiro used the journal to expound on the lessons he drew from the Russian Revolution. According to him, anarchists reacted to the revolution in two ways, both of them partly counter-revolutionary. The first position was taken by the Soviet anarchists who regarded dictatorship as a necessary transitional phase on the way to a stateless society. The second held that the revolution must be immediately fully anarchist and therefore resorted to militarism like Nestor Makhno. He concluded that anarchism could only overcome such problematic reactions by giving more attention to a theory of the revolutionary process rather than the ideal of a post-revolutionary society. Schapiro repeatedly criticized Makhno for his movement, the Makhnovshchyna, as "non-anarchist" or "war anarchism". Schapiro met Makhno when the latter stayed in Berlin for a few weeks in 1925 and the dispute repeatedly escalated into shouting.

In April 1932, Schapiro was elected to the secretariat of the IWMA again, having left in 1925. With initially around 1.5 million workers organized in the IWMA's member organizations, it quickly declined in large part due to government repression and it had less than half a million members by its own estimates in 1929–1930. This number grew at once when democracy was restored in Spain and the Spanish affiliate of the IWMA, the National Confederation of Labor (CNT), was able to operate openly, becoming the IWMA's largest member organization. In December 1932, Schapiro went to Barcelona on behalf of the IWMA in order to set up its Iberian organization. The CNT was beset by internal turmoil, divided between the more moderate leadership, known as the treintistas, and the Iberian Anarchist Federation (FAI), which was established in 1927 to ensure that anarchist principles were strictly followed. Schapiro was tasked with mediating the conflict between the FAI and treintistas.

He traveled on to France, where he continued to work with the IWMA and edited another anarcho-syndicalist paper, La Voix du Travail (The Voice of Labour).

Thoroughly disillusioned, Schapiro left Europe for New York in June 1939. From September 1945 to August 1946, he edited a new anarchist journal entitled New Trends. He published articles on anarcho-syndicalism, the situations in Spain and Russia, as well as the killing of Carlo Tresca. Alexander Schapiro died of heart failure in New York on December 5, 1946. The anarchist Mollie Fleshin reacted to Schapiro's death writing that "the best brains of the movement are passing out one after another and [...] I have a feeling as if the movement itself is passing out".
