= Boris Yelensky =

Russian anarchist propagandist

- Born: February 17, 1889; Krasnodar
- Died: June 18, 1974 (aged 85); US
- Occupations: Soviet propagandist, anarchist, labor activist
- Years active: 1901-1974
- Known for: Anarchist Red Cross
- Notable work: Boris Yelensky papers, 1939-1975

Boris Yelensky (February 17, 1889 – June 18, 1974) was a Russian anarchist propagandist from the early 20th century. Born in Russia in 1889, he participated in the 1905 Revolution, later migrating to the US, returning to take part in the 1917 Revolution and migrating once more to the US. Once there, he became a prominent figure in the anarchism movement, particularly in the Anarchist Red Cross in Chicago.

== Life ==
=== Early years ===
Boris Yelensky was born in Krasnodar, Russia in 1889, near Novorosisk on the Black Sea in the Russian Empire. Born to a capmaker father, he attended a Russian primary school, and worked for his father as a young boy. His family was Jewish, but did not practice Judaism, and Boris did not learn to speak or write Yiddish as a child.

=== Activism ===
He began reading socialist literature at the age of 12, joining the Union of Socialists-Revolutionaries Maximalists and participating in the 1905 botched revolution. Due to repressive pressure (allegedly by the Ohrana), he emigrated to Philadelphia in 1907, joining the Union of Russian Workers and the Radical Library (a branch of the Workmen's Circle) shortly thereafter. With Morris Beresin they were two of the founders of the Black Red Cross. In Philadelphia, he met and married Bessie, who became his lifelong partner. He also learned English and Yiddish once in America.

Travelling to Chicago in 1913, he became the Chicago chapter secretary of the Anarchist Red Cross until 1917; in May that year he travelled to Russia via Japan-Siberia with other members of Golos truda. Hundreds of anarchists left via that same route to participate in the revolution. He was present during the October Revolution, and active in the factory committee movement in Novorossijsk. During his stay in Russia, he was imprisoned twice. He left Russia with his family in 1922, being banned from the USSR in 1923, and deported as a US citizen; he remained secretary of the Russian Political Relief Committee in 1924–1925.

Settling in Chicago once more, he led the Chicago Aid Fund for eleven years, from 1925 on, during which time he formed a section of the Relief Fund of the International Workingmen's Association for Anarchists and Anarcho-Syndicalists Imprisoned and Exiled in Russia. He participated in the new Free Society, running it until 1957. He was also active in the Alexander Berkman Aid Fund from 1936 to 1957, serving as its secretary general. Yelensky also ran several committees initiated by the former organizations, such as the Maximoff Memorial Publication Committee.

In 1937, he organized the 50th anniversary memorial of the Haymarket affair. When the Spanish Civil War broke out, he raised funds for the CNT-FAI through Maximiliano Olay's intermediation.

During the Second World War and immediately afterwards, he offered assistance to victims of the war through his European contacts, sending parcels through CARE.

Yelensky wrote proficiently, and the International Institute of Social History in Amsterdam houses his complete archive, including articles he wrote under his pseudonym Berl Kavkazer.

== Death ==
In 1959, he moved with his wife to Miami, becoming secretary of the Simon Farber Memorial Fund. He died of cancer in June, 1974. He is interred in the German Waldheim Cemetery, close to where Harry Kelly and other prominent anarchists are buried.

== Publications ==
Boris Yalensky published a series of texts during his lifetime, including in publications Golos truzhenika (Chicago, 1918–1927), Delo truda probuzhdenie (New York, 1940–1963), Freie Arbeiter Stimme (New york, 1890–1977), Dos Fraye Vort, Industrial Worker, Freedom (New York, 1919) and The Match! (Tucson, 1969-). However, he is most notable for two works: his published letters, the Boris Yelensky papers, 1939-1975, which consists of a series of letters (including to Lucy Parsons), essays, novels, and memoirs, including photographs; and In the Struggle for Equality, a history of the Anarchist Red Cross.

== See also ==
- Senya Fleshin
