= Platformism =

Form of anarchist organization

Platformism is an anarchist organizational theory that aims to create a tightly coordinated anarchist federation. Its main features include a common tactical line, federalism, a unified political policy and a commitment to collective responsibility.

First developed by Peter Arshinov in response to the perceived disorganization of the Russian anarchist movement, platformism proposes that a "general union of anarchists" be established to agitate, educate and organize the working classes. It advocates working within existing mass organizations, such as trade unions, in order to transform them into vehicles for a social revolution. In the course of revolution, platformists emphasize the creation of workers' councils, such as the free soviets, to serve as institutions of self-management in a stateless society.

== History ==
=== Precursors ===
The roots of platformism go back as far as the organizational principles of Mikhail Bakunin, particularly in his theory of "organisational dualism". Bakunin proposed that anarchists form their own revolutionary organisations that would encourage and agitate workers to rebel against the state and capitalism, and once a social revolution had replaced the state with a federation of voluntary associations, it would then further agitate against any attempted reconstitution of the state by political parties.

The Platform's most direct predecessor was the Draft Declaration of the Revolutionary Insurgent Army of Ukraine, adopted in 1919 by the Military Revolutionary Council of the Makhnovshchina. The Draft Declaration called for a "Third Revolution" against the Bolshevik government, in order to establish a regime of free soviets. It centred the Revolutionary Insurgent Army of Ukraine as the nucleus of this revolution, where the organization's entire membership would carry out the decision-making process. In 1921, the Makhnovists published another Declaration that proclaimed a dictatorship of the proletariat in the form of an anarchist-led trade union system, for which Nestor Makhno himself was accused of Bonapartism.

During this period, the Nabat Confederation of Anarchist Organizations, which had originally been established as a loose-knit organization, developed into a tightly organized structure with a unified policy and an executive committee, in what one member would later describe as a precursor to platformism.

=== Formulation ===
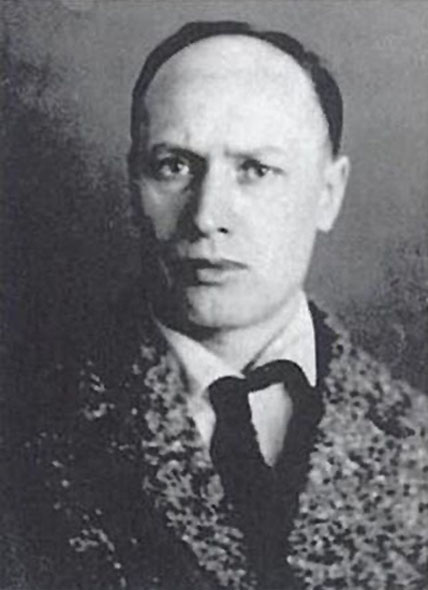
Peter Arshinov, the main theoretician of the Platform.

After their flight into exile, Russian and Ukrainian anarchists began to call for the reorganization of the anarchist movement, considering that chronic disorganization had led to their defeat during the Revolution. Among the anarcho-communists, Peter Arshinov was the most vocal advocate of reorganization.

On 20 June 1926, the Organizational Platform of the General Union of Anarchists (Draft) was published in Delo truda, with an introduction penned by Arshinov. Considering the goal of anarchism to be a social revolution that would create a stateless and classless society, the Platform proposed the establishment of a General Union of Anarchists to educate the working class and raise class consciousness. This General Union was to be organised according to the principles of theoretical unity, tactical unity and collective responsibility, and would be coordinated through an executive committee tasked with carrying out collective action and political policy.

=== Debate ===
The Platform was first presented at a meeting of the Delo truda group, with attendees also including Bulgarian, Chinese, French and Italian anarchists. At the meeting, Arshinov introduced the document as a way forward for the international anarchist movement to "marshal its forces". Although supported by Nestor Makhno, Arshinov's Platform was opposed by most prominent anarchists at the time. French anarchists in attendance, led by Sebastien Faure, criticised it as Russocentric, considering it unapplicable to the material conditions in France. In the years that followed, Faure's Anarchist Synthesis, which rejected platformism in favor of a more loose-knit organization, contributed to dividing the anarchist movement into "synthesists" and "platformists".

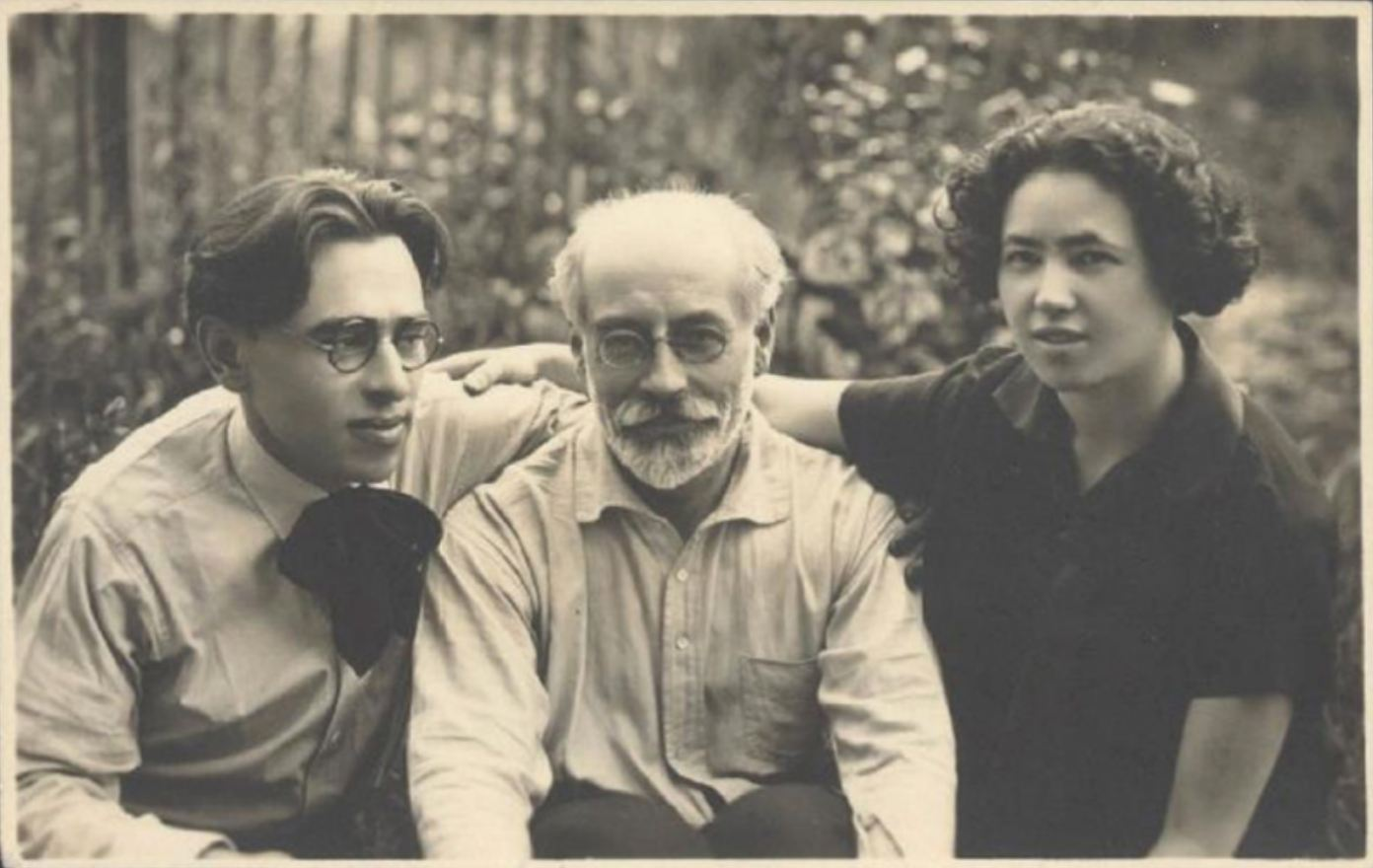
Senya Fleshin (left), Volin (centre), and Mollie Steimer (right), three of the Platform's main critics.

The Platform's harshest critics included Volin, Senya Fleshin and Mollie Steimer, who denounced the Platform as an attempt to create an anarchist political party, which they feared would inevitably result in the formation of a police state. Arshinov responded by claiming his Platform actually abided by anarchist principles, as it consciously avoided coercion and preserved decentralization. The debate also took a more personal turn as Makhno and Arshinov attacked Volin, which attracted denunciations from other critics of the Platform, including Alexander Berkman, who denounced Makhno as a militarist and Arshinov as a Bolshevik.

After years of defending the ideas of platformism, in the early 1930s, Arshinov joined the Communist Party and defected to the Soviet Union, where he would disappear during the Great Purge. Nestor Makhno himself died in 1934, leaving the Platform without any prominent defenders. Nevertheless, both the opponents and remaining supporters of the Platform managed to reconcile at Makhno's funeral. Volin himself took up the publication of Makhno's memoirs, which were published in the years after his death.

=== Organizational developments ===
During the Spanish Revolution of 1936, a number of revolutionary anarchist hard-liners formed the Friends of Durruti Group in opposition to the state's militarisation of the confederal militias. After the Revolution was suppressed, the group published Towards a Fresh Revolution, which called for a revolutionary council to reform the militias and bring the economy back under the control of the Confederación Nacional del Trabajo (CNT), which would effectively have dissolved the government of Spain. In the wake of the 1944 Bulgarian coup d'état, the Federation of Anarchist Communists of Bulgaria (FAKB) issued its own Platform, which argued for a specifically anarcho-communist federation, coordinated by a central secretariat, which would participate in trade unions and prepare for a social revolution.

In 1953, the French anarchist Georges Fontenis published his Manifesto of Libertarian Communism, which attacked the prevailing synthesist orientation of the French anarchist movement, becoming the founding document for the Libertarian Communist Federation (FCL). Drawing from aspects of the Platform, Fontenis' Manifesto called for an anarchist revolutionary vanguard to work within existing mass organizations in order to develop a mass movement, with the eventual aim of dissolving itself into the movement and achieving a social revolution. In the years that followed, the FCL united together with the North African Libertarian Movement (MLNA) to establish the Libertarian Communist International (ICL), but their suppression by the French state forced the organization's dissolution in 1957. Platformism was revived in France during the events of the May 1968 movement, when the Revolutionary Anarchist Organization (ORA) was founded, although it would remain the minority tendency within the wider anarchist movement. The formation of the ORA accelerated the establishment of other anarchist federations throughout Europe, such as the Anarchist Federation (AF) in Britain and the Federation of Anarchist Communists (FdCA) in Italy, while the ORA itself would eventually be succeeded by the Libertarian Communist Union (UCL).

Especifismo (English: Specifism) was first developed in 1972 by the Uruguayan Anarchist Federation (FAU), with the publication of its text Huerta Grande, which proposed the creation of a unified political policy directly applicable to the material conditions in Uruguay. The collapse of the ruling right-wing dictatorships towards the end of the Cold War resulted in the emergence of many other especifista groups throughout Latin America, in a process spearheaded by the FAU. In 2003, the Anarkismo.net website was established by an international network of anarcho-communist organizations, including both Latin American especifistas and European platformists, which publishes news and analysis in a variety of different languages.

== Bibliography ==
- Avrich, Paul (1971) [1967]. The Russian Anarchists. Princeton: Princeton University Press. ISBN 0-691-00766-7. OCLC 1154930946.
- Baker, Zoe (2023). "Organizational Dualism: From Bakunin to the Platform". Means and Ends: The Revolutionary Practice of Anarchism in Europe and the United States. AK Press. pp. 307–346. ISBN 978-1-84935-498-1. OCLC 1345217229.
- Berry, David (2002). A History of the French Anarchist Movement: 1917 to 1945. Westport, CT: Greenwood Press. ISBN 0-313-32026-8. ISSN 0885-9159. LCCN 2001054702.
- Darch, Colin (2020). Nestor Makhno and Rural Anarchism in Ukraine, 1917-1921. London: Pluto Press. ISBN 9781786805263. OCLC 1225942343.
- Graham, Robert (2018). "Anarchism and the First International". In Adams, Matthew S.; Levy, Carl (eds.). The Palgrave Handbook of Anarchism. London: Palgrave Macmillan. pp. 325–342. doi:10.1007/978-3-319-75620-2_19. ISBN 978-3319756196. S2CID 158605651.
- Malet, Michael (1982). Nestor Makhno in the Russian Civil War. London: Palgrave Macmillan. ISBN 978-0-333-25969-6. OCLC 8514426.
- Schmidt, Michael (2013) [2012]. Cartography of Revolutionary Anarchism. Edinburgh: AK Press. ISBN 978-1849351386. OCLC 881111188.
- Skirda, Alexandre (2002). Facing the enemy: A history of anarchist organisation. Translated by Sharkey, Paul. Oakland: AK Press. ISBN 1902593197. OCLC 490977034.
- Skirda, Alexandre (2004) [1982]. Nestor Makhno–Anarchy's Cossack: The Struggle for Free Soviets in the Ukraine 1917–1921. Translated by Sharkey, Paul. Oakland: AK Press. pp. 274–290. ISBN 978-1-902593-68-5. OCLC 60602979.
- van der Walt, Lucien; Schmidt, Michael (2009). "Militant Minority: The Question of Anarchist Political Organisation". Black Flame: The Revolutionary Class Politics of Anarchism and Syndicalism. Edinburgh: AK Press. pp. 239–270. ISBN 978-1-904859-16-1. LCCN 2006933558. OCLC 1100238201.
