= Golos truda =

Russian anarchist newspaper

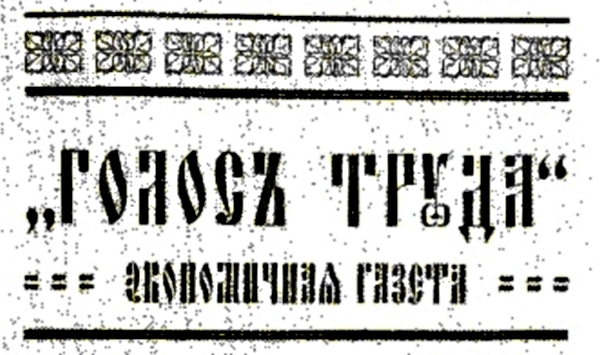
- Header of the first Russian edition, published August 11, 1917
- Type: Monthly/weekly/daily periodical
- Publisher: Union of Russian Workers (New York); Anarcho-Syndicalist Propaganda Union / Golos truda group (Russia)
- Founded: New York, 1911
- Ceased publication: 1917, 1919
- Political alignment: Anarchist
- Language: Russian
- Headquarters: New York (1911–1917); Petrograd (1917–1918); Moscow (1918)
- Sister newspapers: The Float

Golos truda (Russian: Голос труда, lit. 'The Voice of Labour') was a Russian-language anarchist newspaper. Founded by working-class Russian expatriates in New York City in 1911, Golos truda shifted to Petrograd during the Russian Revolution in 1917, when its editors took advantage of the general amnesty and right of return for political dissidents. There, the paper integrated itself into the anarchist labour movement, pronounced the necessity of a social revolution of and by the workers, and situated itself in opposition to the myriad of other left-wing movements.

The rise to power of the Bolsheviks marked the turning point for the newspaper however, as the new government enacted increasingly repressive measures against the publication of dissident literature and against anarchist agitation in general, and after a few years of low-profile publishing, the Golos truda collective was finally expunged by the Stalinist regime in 1929.

== Background ==
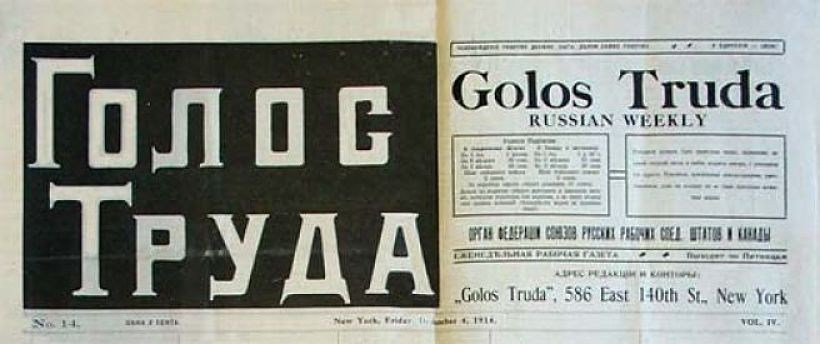
December 4, 1914.

Following the suppression of the Russian Revolution of 1905 and the consequent exile of political dissidents from the Russian Empire, Russian-language journalism in New York City enjoyed a revival. Among the fledgling publications were a number of political newspapers and labor union periodicals, including Golos truda, which the Union of Russian Workers in the United States and Canada began publishing in the city in 1911, initially on a monthly basis. The newspaper adopted its ideology an anarchist version of syndicalism, a fusion of trade unionism and anarchist philosophy which had emerged from the 1907 International Anarchist Congress of Amsterdam and along similar lines in America through the influential Industrial Workers of the World. The anarcho-syndicalists rejected state-oriented political struggle and intellectualism, instead proposing labor unions as the revolutionary agents that would bring about an anarchist society characterised primarily by worker collectives.

At the outbreak of the Russian Revolution in 1917, the Russian Provisional Government declared a general amnesty and offered to fund the return of those Russians who had been exiled as political opponents of the Empire; the entire staff of Golos truda elected to leave New York City for Russia and to move the periodical to Petrograd. In Vancouver on May 26, 1917, the editors, along with Ferrer Center artist Manuel Komroff and thirteen others, boarded a ship bound for Japan. On board, the anarchists played music, gave lectures, staged plays and even published a revolutionary newspaper, The Float. From Japan, the band made their way to Siberia, and proceeded East to European Russia.

== Publication in Russia ==
Though initially the Bolsheviks had not enjoyed much popularity following the February Revolution—with liberal Prime Minister Alexander Kerensky retaining enough support to repress an attempted coup d'état by the faction in July—they capitalized on the disorder and economic collapse of Russian society, mass worker's strikes and the Kornilov affair to increase their popularity among—and ultimately control over—the Soviets. Volin lamented that the almost six-month gap between the February Revolution and the launch of Golos truda in Russia as "a long and irreparable delay" for the anarchists; they now faced a difficult task, with the majority of the workers having been won over by the powerful, consolidated Bolshevik Party whose propaganda efforts dwarfed those of the anarchists.

In Petrograd, the work of beginning publication was assisted by the nascent Anarchist-Syndicalist Propaganda Union, and the new paper bolstered the city's indigenous anarchist workers' movement. Its editorial staff included Maksim Rayevsky, Vladimir Shatov (the linotype operator), Volin, Gregori Maksimov, Alexander Schapiro, and Vasya Swieda.

The first (weekly) issue was published on August 11, 1917, with an editorial stated its firm opposition to the tactics and programs of the Bolsheviks, Mensheviks, left Social Revolutionaries, right Social Revolutionaries and others, and that the conception of revolutionary action of the anarchist socialists bore no resemblance to those of the Marxist socialists. It declared as its principal goal a revolution that would replace the state with a free confederation of autonomous "peasant unions, industrial unions, factory committees, control commissions and the like in locations all over the country". This revolution would be "anti-statist in its methods of struggle, syndicalist in its economic content, and federal in its political tasks". It placed its greatest hopes in the factory committees, which had arisen spontaneously around the country after the February Revolution.

Each of the early issues contained what Volin later described as "clear and definite articles on the way in which the Anarcho-Syndicalists conceived the constructive tasks of the Revolution to come", citing as examples "a series of articles on the role of the factory committees; articles on the tasks of the Soviets, and others on how to resolve the agrarian problem, on the new organization of production, and on exchange". It published copious articles on the general strike as well as on the French bourses du travail and syndicats. The paper shifted to daily publication for three months after the October Revolution of that same year. In a series of articles, it proclaimed the necessity of immediately abandoning the vanguardist Bolshevik dictatorship of the proletariat, and of allowing the workers freedom of association and action.

Although Golos truda sharply criticized the anarchist communists of Petrograd as romantics, ignorant of the complex social forces of the Revolution among Petrograd's Bolshevik-supporting factory workers, the ideas of the union and its paper were considered bizarre and met with little initial success. Despite this, the anarchist-syndicalist union persisted and gradually acquired a degree of influence, focusing its efforts through propaganda in Golos truda, with the intent of capturing the attention of the public with its ideals and by differentiating itself from the other radical factions. The paper's circulation continuing to increase in the city and its provinces, with robust anarchist collectives and meetings emerging in Kronstadt, Oboukhovo, and Kolpino. In March 1918, the Bolsheviks moved the seat of government from Petrograd to Moscow, and the anarchists swiftly followed, moving the printing of Golos truda to the new capital.

== Suppression and legacy ==
The Central Executive Committee of the Congress of Soviets issued a press decree that let the Bolsheviks suppress dissident newspapers. After the suppression of the Golos truda by the Bolshevik government in August 1918, G.P Maximoff, Nikolai Dolenko and Efim Yarchuk established Volny golos truda (The Free Voice of Labour). At the Tenth Party Congress in March 1921, Bolshevik leader Vladimir Lenin declared war against the petite bourgeoisie, and in particular the anarchists, with immediate consequences; the Cheka closed the publishing and printing premises of Golos truda in Petrograd, as well as the paper's bookstore in Moscow, where all but half a dozen anarchists had been arrested.

Despite the banning of their paper, the Golos truda group continued on, however, and issued a final edition in the form of a journal, in Petrograd and Moscow in December 1919. During the New Economic Policy period (1921–1928), it released a number of works, including the publication of the collected works of pre-eminent anarchist theorist Mikhail Bakunin from its bookstore and publishing house in Petrograd between 1919 and 1922. What little anarchist activity the regime tolerated ended in 1929, after the accession of Joseph Stalin, and the bookshops of the Golos truda group in Moscow and Petrograd were closed permanently amidst an abrupt and violent wave of repression. The newspaper was also suppressed by the Post Office Department in the United States, where it was succeeded by the widely circulated Khleb i volya (Bread and Freedom), first published on February 26, 1919, which in turn was banned from the United States and Canada for its anarchist position.

Russian revolutionary anarchist-turned-Bolshevik Victor Serge described Golos truda as the most authoritative anarchist group active in 1917, "in the sense that it was the only one to possess any semblance of doctrine, a valuable collection of militants" who foresaw that the October Revolution "could only end in the formation of a new power".

== See also ==
- Anarchism in Russia
- Delo truda, an anarchist newspaper set up by Russian exiles in Paris in 1925
- List of anarchist periodicals
- Novy mir, a magazine of Russian social democratic émigrés that was part of the Russian journalism revival in New York City around the time of Golos Truda' founding

== Bibliography ==
- Avrich, Paul (2006). The Russian Anarchists. Stirling: AK Press. ISBN 1-904859-48-8.
- Volin (1974). The Unknown Revolution, 1917-1921. New York: Free Life Editions. ISBN 0-914156-07-1. OCLC 2848033.
