= Buntar =

Buntar may refer to:

- Adnan Buntar, a Brunei diplomat
- Buntar Aerospace, a Ukrainian defence technology company
  - Buntar-3, an unmanned aerial vehicle manufactured by Buntar Aerospace
- Buntars, Ukrainian rebels in the "Going to the People" movement during the Russian Empire in 1874

== See also ==
- Parit Buntar, a town in Malaysia
