= Efim Yarchuk =

- Юхим Ярчук
- Born: Yukhym Zakharovych Yarchuk; 1882; Berezne, Rovensky Uyezd, Volhynia, Russian Empire
- Died: 1937 (aged 54–55); Soviet Union
- Cause of death: Execution by shooting
- Occupation: Tailor
- Political party: Communist Party of the Soviet Union (1925–1937)
- Other political affiliations: Black Banner (1903–1905); Union of Russian Workers (1913–1917); Russian Confederation of Anarcho-Syndicalists (1918–1920)
- Movement: Anarcho-syndicalism

Efim Zakharovych Yarchuk (Note: Ukrainian: Юхим Захарович Ярчук, romanized: Yukhym Zakharovych Yarchuk) (1882–1937, also known as Khaim Zakharev) (Note: Ukrainian: Хаїм Захар'єв, romanized: Khaim Zakhariev) was a Ukrainian Jewish anarcho-syndicalist. A partisan of the Black Banner organisation during the Russian Revolution of 1905, he was exiled to Siberia and then emigrated to the United States, where he joined the Union of Russian Workers. In the wake of the February Revolution of 1917, he returned from exile and took up the leadership of the anarchist movement on the island of Kronstadt, leading local soldiers during the July Days and the October Revolution.

Following the suppression of his newspaper Golos Truda and a series of arrests by the Cheka, Yarchuk became disillusioned with the Bolsheviks and began to agitate against them. For this he was imprisoned and only released after a hunger strike attracted protests from syndicalist delegates to the founding congress of the Profintern. He was deported from Russia and briefly resumed his publishing activities in exile, but in 1925, he was permitted to return to the Soviet Union, where he was executed during the Great Purge.

== Biography ==
Efim Yarchuk was born in 1882, into a Jewish family, in the city of Berezne, where he worked as a tailor.

In 1903, he became an anarchist, and co-founded the Chernoe Znamia organisation in Belostok, where he agitated among the workers during the Russian Revolution of 1905. For his revolutionary activities, he was deported to Siberia for five years, after which he emigrated to the United States in 1913. He settled in New York City, where he joined the anarcho-syndicalists of the Union of Russian Workers and wrote for its newspaper Golos Truda.

Yarchuk returned from exile in the wake of the February Revolution of 1917. He moved to Petrograd, where he continued his work with Golos Truda and was elected to the Petrograd Soviet. He was subsequently delegated to the soviet on the island of Kronstadt, where he organised the local anarchist movement, as a member of the soviet's executive committee. Yarchuk played a leading role during the July Days, giving a speech on 3 July in Kronstadt's Anchor Square, which initiated an armed uprising against the Russian Provisional Government. The following day, he led the soldiers of Kronstadt to Petrograd, where they took part in an armed demonstration. During a meeting of the revolutionaries at the Kshesinskaya Palace on 5 July, he aligned with the Bolsheviks, who considered any attempt to seize power to be premature.

During the October Revolution, Yarchuk led the Kronstadt sailors in the storming of the Winter Palace, hoping that the overthrow of the Russian bourgeoisie would eventually lead towards anarchy. He was subsequently delegated to the Second All-Russian Congress of Soviets of Workers' and Soldiers' Deputies and led the Kronstadt soldiers in battle against Alexey Kaledin's Don Army. He later returned to Petrograd as a delegate to the Third All-Russian Congress of Workers', Soldiers' and Peasants Deputies' Soviets, following which he continued his work with Golos Truda, which was soon suppressed by the new Bolshevik-led government. In August 1918, he participated in the First All-Russian Conference of Anarcho-Syndicalists, which established a new newspaper, Volnyi Golos Truda, with Yarchuk joining its editorial board. The new paper represented the far-left of the Russian anarcho-syndicalist movement, which advocated a militant form of syndicalism inspired by Mikhail Bakunin. At the Second All-Russian Conference of Anarcho-Syndicalists, which took place in November 1918, Yarchuk and Grigorii Maksimov were tasked with establishing an All-Russian Confederation of Anarcho-Syndicalists. However, this organisation would prove stillborn, and Yarchuk himself was arrested by the Cheka that month.

This experience turned Yarchuk and the anarcho-syndicalists against the Bolsheviks. In March 1920, at a conference of food industry workers in Moscow, Yarchuk and Maksimov proposed a resolution that denounced the Bolsheviks for creating a centralised dictatorship over the country's workers. Following the conclusion of the siege of Perekop in November 1920, the Bolsheviks launched a crackdown on the anarchist movement, during which Yarchuk was again arrested by the Cheka and detained for a number of weeks. He was released in January 1921 and joined the organisation committee for Peter Kropotkin's funeral, petitioning Vladimir Lenin to allow the release of imprisoned anarchists for the event.

Yarchuk was arrested again during the events of the Kronstadt rebellion, which prevented him from participating in it. Yarchuk and Maksimov were interned in Taganka Prison, where they joined a number of other imprisoned anarchists. In June 1921, while the founding congress of the Profintern was being held in Moscow, Yarchuk and the other imprisoned anarchists went on hunger strike, to attract the attention of visiting syndicalist delegates. As a result, the striking prisoners were released and deported from Soviet Russia to Germany in January 1922. In Berlin, Yarchuk and Maksimov established a new anarcho-syndicalist newspaper Rabochii Put'. The following year, he moved to Paris, where he published an account of his time in Kronstadt during the Revolution.

In 1925, Yarchuk applied for permission to return to the Soviet Union and join the Communist Party, which was granted by Nikolai Bukharin. A decade later, he was executed during the Great Purge.

== Bibliography ==
- Avrich, Paul (1971) [1967]. The Russian Anarchists. Princeton: Princeton University Press. ISBN 0-691-00766-7. OCLC 1154930946.
