= Peter Arshinov =

Russian anarcho-communist (1886–1937)

- Пётр Аршинов
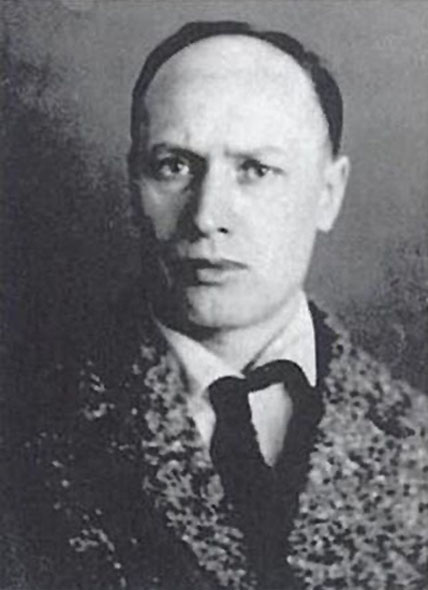
- Arshinov in 1926
- Born: 7 February 1887; Nizhny Lomov, Penza, Russian Empire (Note: These are the place and date of birth provided by Arshinov in his application to join the Society of Former Political Prisoners and Exiled Settlers, however, they are not confirmed by the parish register of Andreyevka. Other sources claim him to have been born in the Ukrainian city of Katerynoslav.)
- Disappeared: c. 1 April 1940 (aged 53); Soviet Union
- Cause of death: Execution by shooting (presumed)
- Other name: Peter Marin
- Occupations: Metalworker; editor; historian
- Years active: 1905–1934
- Known for: Platformism
- Notable work: History of the Makhnovist Movement; Organisational Platform of the General Union of Anarchists
- Political party: Russian Social Democratic Labour Party (1904–1906); Communist Party of the Soviet Union (1931–1937)
- Other political affiliations: Nabat (1918–1920)
- Movement: Makhnovshchina

Peter Andreyevich Arshinov (Russian: Пётр Андре́евич Арши́нов; (Note: Also known by the Ukrainian: Петро Андрійович Аршинов, romanized: Petro Andriyovych Arshynov.) 1887 – c. 1940) was a Russian anarchist revolutionary and intellectual who chronicled the history of the Makhnovshchina.

Joining the Bolshevik faction of the Russian Social Democratic Party during the 1905 Revolution, the following year he became active within the Ukrainian anarchist movement, taking part in attacks on Tsarist officials. He was arrested for this and imprisoned in Butyrka prison, where he met Nestor Makhno. Following the 1917 Revolution, he was released and returned to Ukraine to join Makhno's partisan movement. Arshinov became a leading intellectual figure within the Makhnovist movement, serving as editor of its main newspaper, and chronicling the movement's development as its official historian.

When the movement was suppressed by the Soviet government, he went into exile, where he participated in the publication of the Organisational Platform and the debates surrounding it. By the 1930s, he had moved back towards communism and returned to the Soviet Union, where he disappeared during the Great Purge. He is generally presumed to have been executed.

== Biography ==
=== Early life ===
Peter Andreyevich Arshinov was born on 7 February [O.S. 26 January] 1887, in the village of Andreyevka, in Penza Governorate of the Russian Empire. Raised in a working-class family, Arshinov moved to Turkestan at the age of 17, where he worked as a machinist. He graduated from a vocational school in Ashgabat, before going on to work in a railway workshop in Gyzylarbat. (Note: According to Alexandre Skirda, Arshinov had also trained as a locksmith.)

=== Early revolutionary activities ===
With the outbreak of the 1905 Revolution, he joined the Bolshevik faction of the Russian Social Democratic Party and edited one of its underground newspapers, Molot (English: The Hammer), based in Gyzylarbat. After attracting police attention for his revolutionary activities, in 1906, he moved to the Ukrainian city of Katerynoslav. He soon split with the Bolsheviks over ideological disagreements and became a member of the Ukrainian anarchist movement. Following the repression of the revolution, in December 1906, Arshinov led the formation of an anarchist terrorist cell in Katerynoslav. He organised a series of attacks, including the bombing of the police station in Amur on 5 January 1907 [O.S. 23 December 1906] which killed several Cossacks. He also assassinated a government official.

On 20 March [O.S. 7 March] 1907, Arshinov publicly assassinated a railway boss in Oleksandrivsk. He sought revenge, as the boss had suppressed strike actions and denounced 120 workers during the revolution, resulting in the execution of more than 100 of them. He was quickly arrested and sentenced to be hanged, but his sentence was later commuted and he used this time to plan an escape. He broke out of prison on Easter Sunday, and fled to France. There he wrote for the anarchist newspaper Buntar, publishing in it an obituary to a comrade who had been executed for the assassination of the railway boss. The Okhrana put Arshinov on their wanted list, describing him as "one of the most dangerous terrorists" in Russia.

In September 1909, he clandestinely crossed the border into Russia, where he distributed propaganda among workers in Bryansk and Moscow, and carried out robberies in Kostroma and Smolensk. He then moved to Austria-Hungary, where he engaged in arms trafficking and the smuggling of anarchist propaganda into the Russian Empire. In August 1910, Austrian authorities arrested him when he crossed back over the border. In May 1911, he was extradited to Russia, where he was sentenced to 20 years in Butyrka prison. (Note: Skirda believes he escaped a harsher sentence as he had used a number of aliases to distance himself from his earlier terrorist activities. Among his various pseudonyms were Vladimir, Gulyak A., and Peter Marin.)

=== With the Makhnovshchina ===
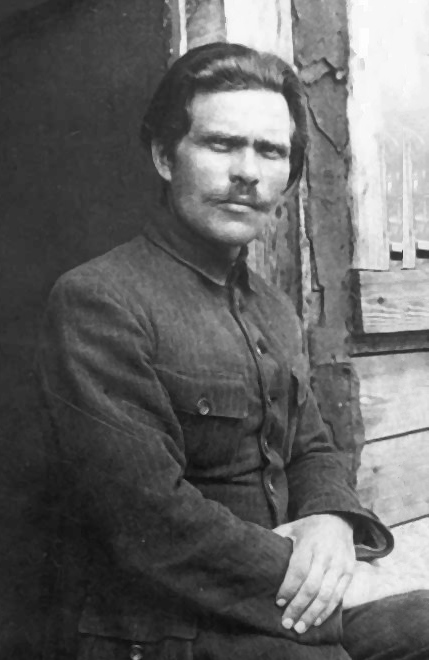
Nestor Makhno, the Ukrainian anarchist who led a revolutionary mass movement to establish anarchist communism during the Ukrainian War of Independence

In prison, Arshinov was acquainted with the young Ukrainian anarchist Nestor Makhno. He took Makhno under his wing as a pupil, teaching him Russian language and literature, mathematics, geography, history, economics and politics. Following the February Revolution, they were released from prison as part of a general amnesty. While Makhno returned home to Ukraine, Arshinov remained behind in Moscow and began organising with the local Anarchist Federation. He also established an anarchist publishing house, through which he printed the works of Mikhail Bakunin and Peter Kropotkin.

Following the October Revolution, he quickly became demoralised by the direction of events and lost interest in himself returning to Ukraine. As a consequence of the Treaty of Brest-Litovsk, Ukraine was invaded and occupied by the Central Powers, with support from the Ukrainian nobility. The peasants reacted by carrying out a campaign of guerrilla warfare against the occupation forces and their Ukrainian collaborators, as part of a war of independence that spread throughout the country. One of these peasant insurgent bands was led by Makhno, who defeated the occupation forces at the battle of Dibrivka and captured much of his home region. He became the leader of a mass movement of the Ukrainian peasantry, who declared him their Bat'ko (English: Father).

In the wake of the anarchist victory, Arshinov joined a number of other Russian anarchist intellectuals in emigrating to Ukraine. There they established the Nabat, a confederation of Ukrainian anarchist organisations. In Donbas, he edited the newspaper Voice of the Anarchist through 1918. In April 1919, Arshinov arrived in Huliaipole, where he was reunited with Makhno and joined his movement, becoming a leading ideologue within the Cultural-Educational Department. The following month, Arshinov began editing the movement's newspaper The Road to Freedom, which published 50 issues in the Katerynoslav region until November 1920. During this period, Arshinov observed the nascent Makhnovist movement establishing agricultural communes, organised according to the communist principle of "from each according to their ability, to each according to their needs".

The anarchist region soon came under attack by the White movement, which forced them to negotiate an alliance with the Red Army, which had also invaded Ukraine. While on their way to meet the Bolshevik delegate Lev Kamenev in Huliaipole, Arshinov witnessed Makhno execute one of his own followers for antisemitism. He then observed Makhno and Kamenev's meeting, which initially seemed amicable, but which Arshinov later came to question the intent of. By May 1919, relations between the Bolsheviks and the anarchists had become strained by political divisions and the collapse of the Donbas front. Arshinov attributed the problems to Red Army commanders, whom he claimed had deliberately deprived the insurgents of weaponry. Makhno soon resigned his command and, now under attack by both the Reds and the Whites, resolved to retreat into the west.

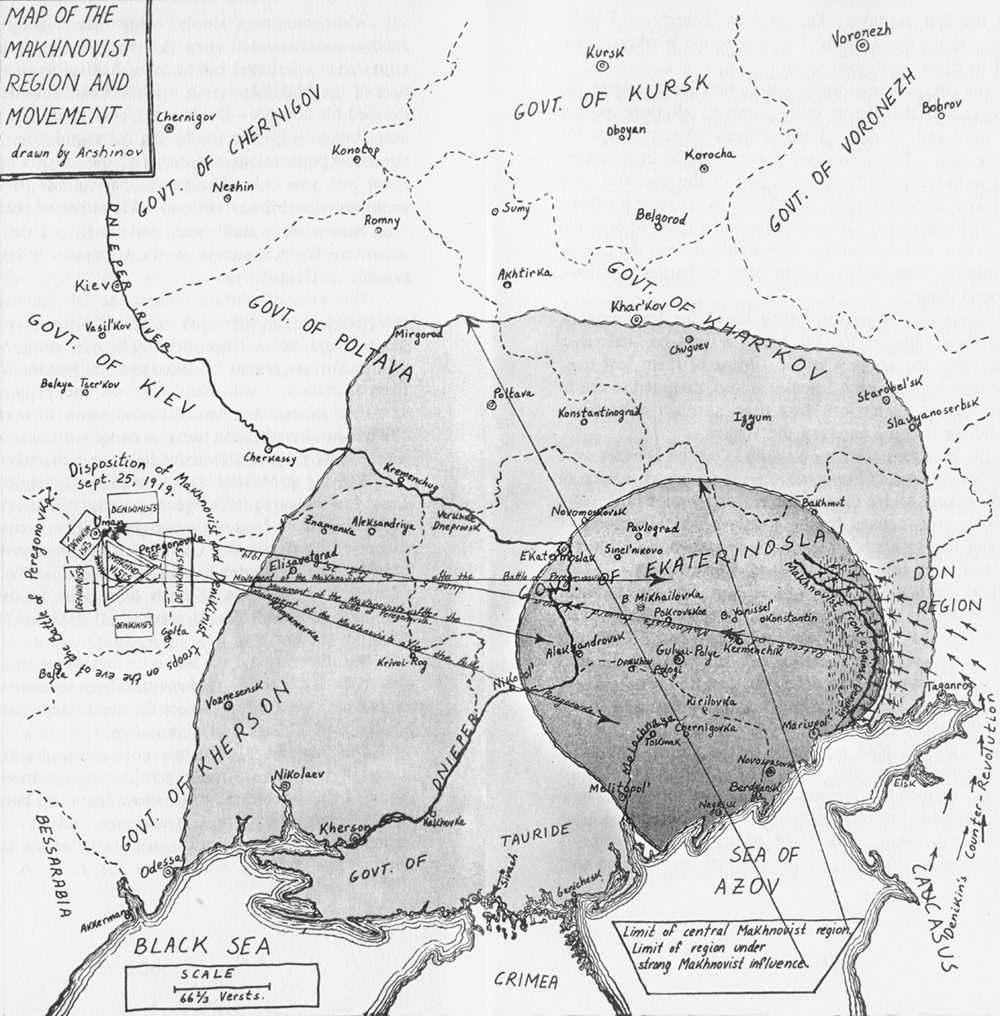
Map of the Makhnovshchina, drawn by Arshinov

Arshinov joined the Makhnovists in their westward retreat, during which he witnessed large numbers of people joining the newly constituted Insurgent Army. He was also present for the assassination of Nykyfor Hryhoriv. In September 1919, Arshinov was among the Russian anarchists who prevented the Insurgent Army's unification with the Ukrainian People's Army. Arshinov then witnessed the battle of Peregonovka, where the Insurgent Army defeated the Volunteer Army and subsequently captured most of southern Ukraine; Arshinov himself attributed the defeat of the entire White movement to this battle. He returned to his work as editor of The Road to Freedom, through which he advocated for the establishment of anarchist communism in Makhnovist-held territory. But Arshinov then observed what he considered to be a failure to establish either political or military control over left-bank Ukraine, which he blamed on the outbreak of epidemic typhus within the ranks of the Makhnovshchina. The Red Army took the opportunity to attack the Makhnovshchina, which Arshinov estimated to have ultimately resulted in the execution of almost 200,000 Ukrainian peasants by the Bolsheviks.

In January 1920, Arshinov returned to Katerynoslav and took leadership of the local Nabat group. In June 1920, he rejoined the Insurgent Army, for which he edited the newspaper Povstanets. He was later elected to head the cultural-educational department of the Military Revolutionary Council and drew up a programme for the provisioning of free soviets in Ukraine. After months of fighting between the Makhnovists and Bolsheviks, a White offensive into Taurida forced the two factions into an agreement, which brought about the brief cessation of hostilities between them. Arshinov himself justified the pact as a way of bringing them closer together with the mass base that the Bolsheviks had in the proletariat. But following their combined victory over the Whites in the siege of Perekop, Arshinov witnessed the subsequent Bolshevik offensive against the Makhnovshchina on 26 November. He believed the attack had been premeditated.

He then witnessed the subsequent period of guerrilla warfare against the Red Army, documenting their pursuit across the country. Despite the danger, Arshinov remained with Makhno until the spring of 1921, when he left the movement to write a book documenting its history. While in hiding in Moscow, the Cheka searched his house and seized his initial manuscript. He and his wife clandestinely crossed the border into Poland and then went on to Germany.

=== Exile and debates about the Platform ===
In 1922, Arshinov arrived in Berlin, where he completed his History of the Makhnovist Movement. In Berlin, he also formed the Group of Russian Anarchists Abroad and edited the Anarchist Herald newspaper from June 1923 to May 1924. Arshinov then moved to Paris in 1925, where he established the anarchist journal Delo truda (English: The Cause of Labor). In the magazine, he fiercely criticised the new Soviet Union for its suppression of human rights and enforced collectivisation, which he believed were expressions of political bureaucracy and state capitalism. Meanwhile, he earned a living by making handmade shoes, as part of a scheme for Russian refugees, which continued until competition from a French industrial manufacturer made the work no longer profitable.

On 20 June 1926, Arshinov participated in the publication of the Organisational Platform of the General Union of Anarchists, which lay out a framework for how anarcho-communists could politically organise, through theoretical and tactical unity, collective responsibility and federalism. He argued that a unified organisation, formed by a select core of active militants, would be necessary for anarchists to build their strength and lead a revolution. He thus declared the need for an anarchist political organisation, with a homogeneous programme of thought and action, and shared goals. He called for this organisation to make decisions through majority rule, which he considered to be a matter of practical necessity to establish a common policy. He also believed that collective action and organisational discipline required the organisation to have a central executive body, which would carry out specific tasks given to it by congresses. He believed such an organisation could play a leading role in the labour movement by entering the trade unions and influencing them towards revolutionary anarchist objectives. Without such an organisation, he feared the anarchist movement could disintegrate, and that it would never be able to overthrow the Bolsheviks in Russia.

Arshinov argued that theoretical divisions and a lack of solidarity had prevented the anarchist movement from taking a leading role in social movements. He believed that the absence of a unified anarchist organisation had contributed to the failure of the Ukrainian revolution and the weakness of the wider anarchist movement. He argued that, by acting in small, disorganised groups with contradictory tactics, Russian and Ukrainian anarchists had been outmanoeuvred by the Bolsheviks; and that, although the positions adopted by the anarchists had been ideologically "correct", they were also "too general". He held that it was the anarchists who were themselves to blame for the defeat of the revolution, and posited that a unified anarchist organisation could have transformed the Kronstadt rebellion into a nationwide revolution. Pointing to two tendencies of the Russian anarchist movement, one of exiles collaborating with "reactionary" White émigrés and another mystical tendency in Moscow, he also argued that it would impossible for an organisation to synthesise all of anarchism's contradictory tendencies, and that it was necessary to select for a more homogenous ideological outlook and to distinguish that from the "petite-bourgeois" elements of the anarchist movement.

He nevertheless believed that anarchists remained the only real proponents of social revolution, while the Bolsheviks sought to exploit the workers, the other socialist parties offered empty promises, and the liberals only wanted to preserve their old privileges. He believed that the present reality necessitated class struggle by workers to bring about a classless society. After a revolution, he envisioned the establishment of a planned economy under common ownership, with decentralised workers' councils acting as executive bodies to oversee production and consumption; he believed any issues with this process would be rectified by the collective thought and action of the revolutionary movement, until anarchist communism was achieved. He proposed that the establishment of libertarian communism would require a period of "steady and protracted construction", which he distinguished from the dictatorial "transitional period" proposed by the Bolsheviks. Unlike the Bolsheviks, he held that anarchists had no desire to seize state power.

Arshinov's Platform caused an immediate controversy within the anarchist movement. Over three years of debate about the Platform, Arshinov observed four main reactions: enthusiasm, ignorance, incomprehension and outright hostility. He disregarded most criticisms as semantics, based in either a misunderstanding or misrepresentation of the Platform. He also rejected calls to amend the Platform, responding that only a congress to establish a General Union of Anarchists could do so. He expressed particular confusion at criticisms from Errico Malatesta, believing that Malatesta's own principles actually aligned with those of the Platform. He attributed the most hostile responses to those he called "devil may care" individualists, who he claimed were inherently opposed to social organisation. Arshinov was accused of Bolshevism by anarchists such as Alexander Berkman and Volin, the latter of whom claimed Arshinov intended to establish an anarchist political party along bureaucratic and centralist lines. The protracted debate caused Arshinov's relationship with Volin to deteriorate, exacerbated by their class differences and mutual distrust of the other's long-term commitment to the movement.

Although the Platform had been the work of collective deliberations between him, Makhno and other exiled anarchists, Arshinov, as the group's secretary and principal spokesperson, would be most closely associated with it. Arshinov believed that the Platform would be significant to the international anarchist movement, arguing it could mobilise them and expand their forces throughout the globe. He considered it to have been the anarchist movement's first attempt since the 1917 Revolution to make progress in rebuilding its strength. However, he also noted that the intended aims of the Platform had not yet been achieved, which he attributed to the meagre organisational strength of anarchism throughout the world.

=== Return to Russia ===
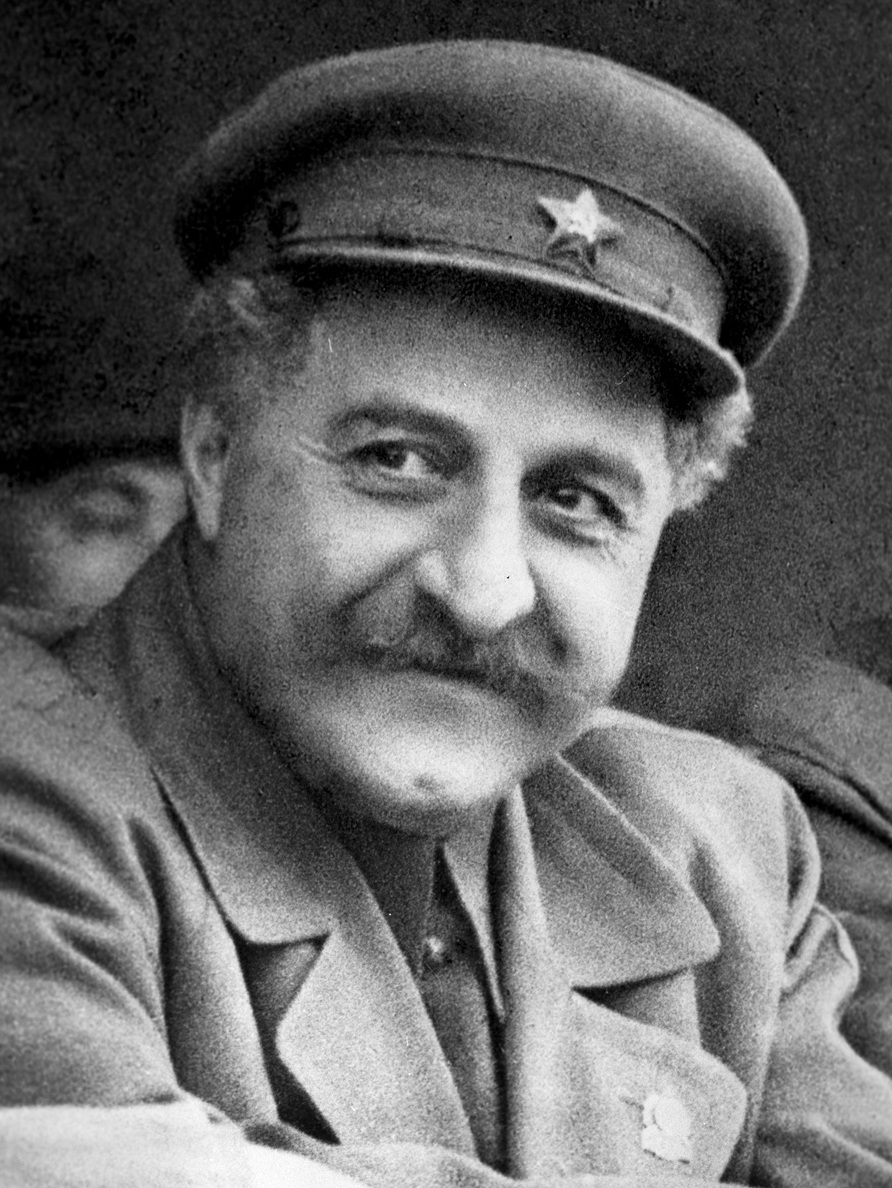
Bolshevik statesman Sergo Ordzhonikidze, who sponsored Arshinov's return to the Soviet Union

In December 1929, the French government ordered Arshinov be expelled from the country due to his revolutionary activities, but the Human Rights League successfully fought for his expulsion to be postponed. He was briefly detained the following year. He continued contributing to Delo truda, which moved its offices to the United States. Over the subsequent year, he became increasingly disillusioned with the anarchist movement and his prospects for life in exile. Arshinov was frustrated that, as a Russian refugee, he lacked a social base and enough French language to communicate his ideas, which he believed was of importance to the entire international anarchist movement. His wife had also grown tired of their exile and wanted their family to return to Russia, which the Bolshevik politician Sergo Ordzhonikidze (Arshinov's former cellmate in Butyrka) offered to sponsor. In return, he would have to cut ties with the anarchist movement, which he had been a part of for 25 years, and cease his criticisms of Soviet communism.

In 1931, Arshinov publicly broke with the anarchist movement and began openly expressing support for the Soviet government of Joseph Stalin. He called for anarchists to recognise the necessity of a "dictatorship of the proletariat", form links with the Communist International and Soviet embassies, and to defend the Soviet Union, which he now considered to be a "workers' state". He also began writing for the Soviet Russian journal Novy Mir, and even went to Spain to convince local anarchists to adopt a pro-Soviet position. He believed that Spanish anarchists would have to choose between establishing a dictatorship or sliding into "reformism and opportunism".

On 4 January 1932, Arshinov wrote to the Politburo of the Communist Party of the Soviet Union, asking for permission to return to Russia. While awaiting his return, the Bulgarian anarchist Nikola Chorbadzhiev privately asked him if he had really converted to Bolshevism. According to Chorbadzhiev, Arshinov responded that he had no prospects for continuing revolutionary activism in Europe, but that in Russia, he would be able to continue propagating anarchism, even if it meant he was forced to join the Communist Party. In December 1934, Arshinov finally returned to the Soviet Union, despite warnings by Volin, who predicted that he would be executed for his anarchist past. There he found work as a proofreader. In a June 1935 article for the Soviet newspaper Izvestia, he announced his complete break with anarchism and his conversion to Marxism-Leninism. Max Nettlau described the move as a "homecoming" and claimed that Arshinov had never really been an anarchist. In his absence, Makhno continued to advocate for Arshinov's Platform, culminating with the establishment of the Libertarian Communist Federation in 1934.

Only three years later, on 21 March 1938, he was arrested in Moscow during the Great Purge. He was charged with anti-Soviet agitation for having allegedly propagandised for anarchism upon his return to Russia, and was accused of having established an anarchist terrorist organization in collaboration with French intelligence agencies. (Note: Alexandre Skirda believes this proves Arshinov had remained committed to anarchism, and had attempted to carry out a clandestine plan to rebuild the movement in Russia.) The NKVD tortured him until he confessed to the charges against him. On 26 November 1939, a military tribunal sentenced him to 10 years of forced labour in a correctional labour camp. On 1 April 1940, he complained to the tribunal that he had not been given the necessary documentation to plead his case. He subsequently disappeared in the Gulag and is widely believed to have been shot. After the dissolution of the Soviet Union, Arshinov was rehabilitated by the Prosecutor General of Russia on 12 October 1992. Meanwhile, his Platform was taken up by the French anarcho-communist Georges Fontenis.

== Works ==
Articles in Russian

- "Василий Бабешко (некролог)" [Vasily Babeshko (obituary)]. Buntar (4): 10–11. 1909.
- "Чего добиваются повстанцы-Махновцы" [What the Makhnovist Partisans Want To Achieve]. The Road to Freedom (1–2): 1–2, 2–4. 1919.
- "На злобу дня: Еще о Григорьеве, Большевизм, Анархизм, Письмо Шкуро" [On the Topic of the Day: More on Grigoriev, Bolshevism, Anarchism, Shkuro's Letter]. The Road to Freedom (3): 2–3. 1919.
- "Повстанчество и Красная армии" [The Partisan Movement and the Red Army]. Ekaterinoslavskii Nabat (1): 1–2. 1920.
- "Анархо-большевизм и его роль в русской революции" [Anarcho-Bolshevism and Its Role in the Russian Revolution]. Anarkhicheskii Vestnik (1): 56–62. 1923.
- "Анархизм и Махновщина" [Anarchism and the Makhno Movement]. Anarkhicheskii Vestnik (2): 27–37. 1923.
- "Проблема производства и потребления в социальной революции" [Constructive Problems of the Social Revolution]. Anarkhicheskii Vestnik (2, 3–4): 11–16, 4–6.
- "Оправдание Нестора Махно" [The Acquittal of Nestor Makhno]. Anarkhicheskii Vestnik (5–6): 25.
- "Крестьянство в России" [The Peasantry in Russia]. Delo truda (2): 1–3. 1925.
- "Тупик большевизма" [The Dead End of Bolshevism]. Delo truda (7/8): 1–2. 1925.
- "Анархизм и синдикализм" [Anarchism and Syndicalism]. Delo truda (9): 6–9. 1926.
- "Памяти В. К. Махайского" [In Memory of V. K. Makhaisky]. Delo truda (11): 5–8. 1926.
- "Споры вокруг крестьянства" [Disputes About the Peasantry]. Delo truda (17): 1–3. 1926.
- "Два октября" [The Two Octobers]. Delo truda (29): 1–4. 1927.
- "Махновщина и ее вчорашние союзники—Большевики" [The Makhno Movement and Its Former Allies—the Bolsheviks]. Delo truda (41–42): 20–22. 1928.
- "Коллективизация сельского хозяйства в СССР" [Collectivization of Agriculture in the USSR]. Delo truda (56/57): 1–6. 1930.

Articles in Spanish

- "La Revolucion española y la experiencia rusa" [The Spanish Revolution and the Russian Experience] (PDF). Solidaridad Obrera (169): 6–7. 1931.

Books in Russian

- История махновского движения (1918–1921 гг.) [History of the Makhnovist Movement (1918–1921)]. Berlin: Group of Russian Anarchists Abroad. 1923.
- Организационная платформа всеобщего союза анархистов [Organizational Platform of the General Union of Anarchists]. Paris: Group of Russian Anarchists Abroad. 1926.
- Два побега: (из воспоминаний анархиста 1906–1909 гг.) [Two Escapes: (from the Memoirs of an Anarchist, 1906–1909)]. Paris: Delo truda. 1929.
- Новое в анархизме: к чему призывает Организационная платформа [The New in Anarchism: What the Organizational Platform Calls for]. Paris: Delo truda. 1929.
- Анархизм и диктатура пролетариата [Anarchism and the Dictatorship of the Proletariat]. Paris: Pascal. 1931.
- Анархизм в наше время [Anarchism in Our Times]. Paris: Pascal. 1933.

English translations

- History of the Makhnovist Movement (1918–1921). Translated by Perlman, Lorraine; Perlman, Fredy. Detroit: Black & Red. 1974 [1923].
- Organizational Platform of the General Union of Anarchists. Translated by McNab, Nestor. Nestor Makhno Archive. 2006 [1926].
- "The Two Octobers". Libertarian Communist Review (1). Translated by Heath, Nick. Organisation of Revolutionary Anarchists. 1976 [1927].
- "Reply to Anarchism's Confusionists". Translated by NEFAC. Nestor Makhno Archive. 2004 [1927].
- "The Old and New in Anarchism". Translated by Heath, Nick. Nestor Makhno Archive. 2001 [1928].
- "Elements Old and New in Anarchism". Translated by NEFAC. Nestor Makhno Archive. 2007 [1928].
- "The Spanish Revolution and the Russian Experience". Translated by Smith, E. G. Steimer Press. 2021 [1931].
- "Constructive Problems of the Social Revolution". Translated by Zurbrugg, A. W. The Anarchist Library. 2025 [1923].

== See also ==
- Bibliography of the Russian Revolution and Civil War
- Outline of the Russian Revolution and Civil War
- Index of articles related to the Russian Revolution and Civil War

== Bibliography ==
- Avrich, Paul (1971) [1967]. The Russian Anarchists. Princeton: Princeton University Press. ISBN 0-691-00766-7. OCLC 1154930946.
- Baker, Zoe (2023). "Organizational Dualism: From Bakunin to the Platform". Means and Ends: The Revolutionary Practice of Anarchism in Europe and the United States. AK Press. pp. 307–346. ISBN 978-1-84935-498-1. OCLC 1345217229.
- Darch, Colin (2020). Nestor Makhno and Rural Anarchism in Ukraine, 1917-1921. London: Pluto Press. ISBN 9781786805263. OCLC 1225942343.
- Malet, Michael (1982). Nestor Makhno in the Russian Civil War. London: Palgrave Macmillan. ISBN 978-0-333-25969-6. OCLC 8514426.
- Palij, Michael (1976). The Anarchism of Nestor Makhno, 1918–1921: An Aspect of the Ukrainian Revolution. Publications on Russia and Eastern Europe. Seattle: University of Washington Press. ISBN 978-0-295-95511-7. OCLC 81941010.
- Patterson, Sean (2020). Makhno and Memory: Anarchist and Mennonite Narratives of Ukraine's Civil War, 1917–1921. Manitoba: University of Manitoba Press. ISBN 978-0-88755-578-7. OCLC 1134608930.
- Peters, Victor (1970). Nestor Makhno: The Life of an Anarchist. Winnipeg: Echo Books. OCLC 7925080.
- Rublev, Dmitrii Ivanovich (2023). "Аршинов Пётр Андреевич" [Arshinov Pyotr Andreevich]. Great Russian Encyclopedia (in Russian). ISSN 2949-2076. Archived from the original on 1 July 2026.
- Skirda, Alexandre (2002). Facing the enemy: A history of anarchist organisation. Translated by Sharkey, Paul. Oakland: AK Press. ISBN 1902593197. OCLC 490977034.
- ———————— (2004). Nestor Makhno–Anarchy's Cossack: The Struggle for Free Soviets in the Ukraine 1917–1921. Translated by Sharkey, Paul. Oakland, CA: AK Press. ISBN 1-902593-68-5. OCLC 60602979.
- Somochkina-Ryzhko, Olena Mykolaivna (2001). "Аршинов Петро Андрійович" [Arshynov Petro Andriiovych]. Encyclopedia of Modern Ukraine (in Ukrainian). Vol. 1. Kyiv: NASU Institute of Encyclopaedic Research. doi:10.5281/zenodo.19849340. ISBN 966-02-2074-X.`
- van der Walt, Lucien; Schmidt, Michael (2009). Black Flame: The Revolutionary Class Politics of Anarchism and Syndicalism. Edinburgh: AK Press. pp. 239–270. ISBN 978-1-904859-16-1. LCCN 2006933558. OCLC 1100238201.
