= Buntar Aerospace =

Ukrainian defense company

- Type: Private
- Industry: Aerospace industry
- Founded: 2023
- Headquarters: Kyiv, Ukraine
- Products: Buntar-3, Buntar Copilot, Buntar Skyhopper
- Website: buntar.com

Buntar Aerospace is a Ukrainian defense company that develops and manufactures unmanned aerial vehicles (UAVs) and software for drone control in warfare. Founded in 2023, its products include the Buntar-3 reconnaissance UAV, the Buntar Copilot software system, and the Buntar Skyhopper.

== Company history ==
Buntar Aerospace was founded in 2023 by Bohdan Sas, Ivan Kaunov, and Kateryna Bezusudna, who came from the Ukrainian IT sector. One of the founders was an active serviceman of the Armed Forces of Ukraine. Kaunov had previously run a fintech startup, being a marketing graduate. After joining the Ukrainian Defense Forces in mid-2022, he was hit by a rocket while leading 150 recruits back from a village east of Bakhmut in the Donbas region. As he sustained a head injury, he was unable to rejoin the infantry, so turned his efforts to technology to help the war effort.

Funding was obtained for a prototype of their first UAV, the Buntar-1, leading to the creation of the company Buntar Aerospace. Buntar is the Ukrainian name for the Star Wars film Rogue One, and the name given to a shuttle. The designers aimed to create a UAV that would be able to be reused, like a space shuttle, rather than be used in a "kamikaze" type of attack, or have its software jammed by Russian operatives.

Bezusudna left the company in 2024.

The company's first UAV, the Buntar-1, was announced in September 2024. In March 2024, the company reported raising more than $1 million in investment. During the same year, it began developing Buntar Copilot, an AI-driven software system that supports UAV control and mission planning in combat conditions.

Buntar Aerospace subsequently entered into merger and acquisition agreements with three development teams, working in areas including drones, communications, and autopilot systems.

== UAVs ==
The company's first UAV, the Buntar-1, was announced in 2024. It was designed for real-time reconnaissance, target designation and artillery fire correction. The UAV had a reported flight range of 50 km (31 mi) and flight endurance of up to 100 minutes.

The company's Buntar-3 UAV was developed after the beginning of the 2022 Russian invasion of Ukraine, in response to a shortage of reconnaissance UAVs among Ukraine's defense forces and the difficulties of operating existing systems in environments affected by electronic warfare. It is described as "not just a separate drone, but a complete system", with the proprietary Copilot to assist the operator in combat. By March 2025, the company had publicly announced approximately $4 million in funding. In May 2025, Buntar Aerospace presented its new Buntar-3 UAV to representatives of Ukraine's Defense Forces. The aircraft featured improved specifications compared with earlier models, including flight endurance of up to 3.5 hours. In June 2025, it announced that it was preparing to launch mass production of Buntar-3.

On 7 March 2026, a Buntar-3 reconnaissance UAV was reported to have been used to correct a Ukrainian missile strike against a site at Donetsk Airport associated with the operation of Shahed attack drones. Around the same period, Buntar Aerospace raised $10.4 million in a funding round led by global security company Axon Enterprise, to develop technology for intelligence collection and processing.

In July 2026, Buntar Aerospace introduced a remote-control system that allows operators to control Buntar-3 UAVs over the Internet from hundreds of kilometres away, while a small forward team launches the aircraft before withdrawing from the area.

== Recognition ==
In 2024, the company was named Startup of the Year by the Ukrainian Startup Fund. In March 2025, it was recognized by DOU as the Most Promising Project in the Defense Tech industry.
