= Buntar-3 =

Ukrainian reconnaissance unmanned aerial vehicle (UAV)

General information
- Type: Reconnaissance unmanned aerial vehicle
- National origin: Ukraine
- Manufacturer: Buntar Aerospace
- Status: In service
- Primary user: Armed Forces of Ukraine

History
- Introduction date: May 2025

Buntar-3 is a reconnaissance unmanned aerial vehicle (UAV) made by the Ukrainian defence-technology company Buntar Aerospace. It takes off and lands vertically, so it needs no runway, and was designed for a battlefield where satellite navigation is frequently jammed. Buntar-3 was unveiled in late May 2025, and used in a March 2026 attack on Donetsk airport, which is occupied by Russian forces.

== History ==
Buntar Aerospace was founded in 2023 by Bohdan Sas, Ivan Kaunov, and Kateryna Bezusudna.

Buntar-3 was unveiled in late May 2025. Before entering production, Buntar-3 was flown in trials along much of the front, from the Pokrovsk, Kupiansk, Lysychansk, Svatove, and Kurakhove sectors to the Belgorod and Bryansk directions across the Russian border.

== Design and specifications ==
Buntar-3 is an electric aircraft that takes off and lands vertically, like a helicopter, so it needs no runway, and can be sent up from a small clearing. It was designed for a battlefield where satellite navigation and radio links are constantly jammed. The name is the Ukrainian word for "rebel", and some outlets have rendered it as "Rebel-3".

Because it runs on electric motors and lifts off vertically, Buntar-3 does without the catapult or runway that many fixed-wing scouts require. At its launch the company put the endurance at up to three and a half hours, a figure it called a record for an electric drone of its type; by early 2026 that claim had grown to as much as four hours as the design matured.

Its reach grew in the same way: early figures gave a stable link to the operator out to 80 kilometres and a camera that could make out targets some 15 kilometres off, while later accounts raised the working range to 100 kilometres, the optical range holding at around 15.

For navigation the drone leaves GPS aside altogether, fixing its position instead by reading the ground beneath it and by measuring radio signals. It carries a daytime camera as standard, with a combined day-and-night unit offered as an upgrade. What the drone sees can be fed straight into Ukrainian situational-awareness systems such as DELTA, and its software ties in with the Signal messenger so that units can pass files and coordinate.

=== Buntar Copilot software ===
Much of what sets Buntar-3 apart lies in its software, Buntar Copilot, which the company describes as a "combat assistant". Rather than simply relaying a video feed, it plans the mission in advance, weighs conditions such as wind, altitude, battery charge and the strength of the radio link, and flags the mistakes a crew under pressure is most likely to make. It can time the launch of a replacement aircraft so that watch over a target is never broken, draw several camera feeds into one picture, and let a single operator run more than one drone from the same station. The maker presents all of this as a way to lose fewer aircraft to human error — poor planning, or a take-off in the wrong weather.

=== Resistance to jamming ===
The drone was designed for a front saturated with electronic warfare, where each side works to block the other's signals. Its developers say that jamming, from the enemy, and at times from friendly forces, routinely makes missions impossible, and they built the aircraft around that problem, giving it stronger radios, carefully chosen frequencies, custom antennas and software meant to hold a link inside a contested area. Its independence from GPS is part of the same logic: with no satellite fix to lose, it can keep flying and reporting while those signals are being blocked.

=== Remote operation ===
In 2026, the company introduced a feature it calls Remote Control, which stretches the distance between the drone and the people flying it to hundreds of kilometres. A small team sets up an antenna and a Starlink terminal at the launch point, gets the aircraft airborne, and then withdraws. Control passes over the Internet, through the Buntar Copilot app, to operators deep in the rear, who receive the live video, telemetry, and flight logs. The purpose is to keep scarce, highly-trained operators out of reach of Russian strikes.

== Uses ==
The UAV's best-documented action came on 7 March 2026, when a Buntar-3 guided a Ukrainian strike on a Russian Shahed drones base at the occupied Donetsk airport, a site used to store, prepare, and launch the attack drones. The blow was struck with SCALP cruise missiles and ATACMS ballistic missiles, while the scouting and fire correction were handled by the 414th "Madyar's Birds" brigade of unmanned systems. The base went up in flames and threw off secondary explosions, a sign that the drones and ammunition stored inside were detonating.
