= Grigorii Maksimov =

Russian anarcho-syndicalist (1893–1950)

- Григо́рий Макси́мов
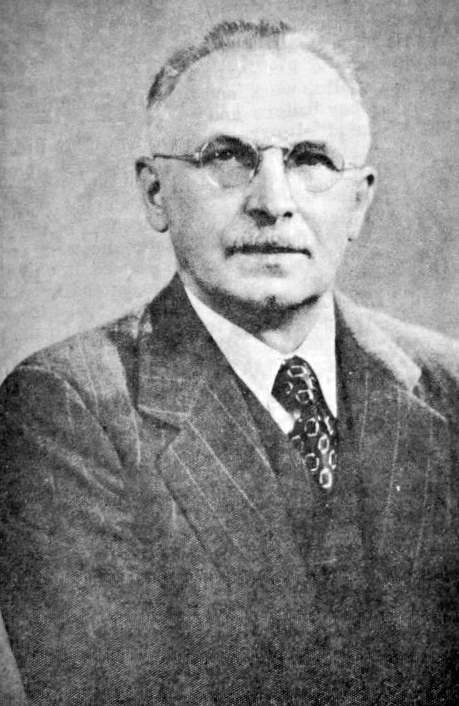
- Born: 10 November 1893; Mityushino, Smolensk, Russian Empire
- Died: 16 March 1950 (aged 56); Chicago, Illinois, United States
- Resting place: Waldheim Cemetery
- Occupations: Agriculturalist, journalist
- Years active: 1917–1950
- Organization(s): Golos truda Delo truda
- Notable work: The Guillotine at Work
- Movement: Anarcho-syndicalism

Grigorii Petrovich Maksimov (Russian: Григо́рий Петро́вич Макси́мов; 10 November 1893 – 16 March 1950) was a Russian anarcho-syndicalist. From the first days of the Russian Revolution, he played a leading role in the country's syndicalist movement, editing the newspaper Golos truda and organising the formation of factory committees. Following the October Revolution, he came into conflict with the Bolsheviks, who he fiercely criticised for their authoritarian and centralist tendencies. For his anti-Bolshevik activities, he was eventually arrested and imprisoned, before finally being deported from the country. In exile, he continued to lead the anarcho-syndicalist movement, spearheading the establishment of the International Workers' Association (IWA), of which he was a member until his death.

== Biography ==
Grigorii Petrovich Maksimov was born on 10 November 1893 into a peasant family in Smolensk. He studied at a seminary of the Orthodox Church in Vladimir, but ultimately decided not to become a priest and instead moved to Saint Petersburg, where he studied to become an agriculturist. During his time at the Agricultural Academy, he became acquainted with anarchism, through the works of Mikhail Bakunin and Peter Kropotkin.

After graduating in 1915, he was immediately drafted into the Imperial Russian Army and deployed to the Eastern Front. He returned to Petrograd during the February Revolution and participated in the workers' strikes that overthrew the Russian Empire. He quickly became a prolific speaker in factories and at workers' rallies. By June 1917, he had been elected to the city's central council of factory committees and became one of its most active members, as part of a rising tide of anarcho-syndicalism in the Russian capital.

In August 1917, he joined the editorial staff of the anarcho-syndicalist newspaper Golos truda and became one of its main contributors. In the articles he penned for the paper, Maksimov spoke in favour of the factory committees as a model for workers' control, while he criticised mainstream Russian trade unions, which he considered to be a relic of capitalism. He also criticised the anarcho-communists for their advocacy of the immediate expropriation of factories by workers, instead believing in the need for a transitional stage for workers to be trained for the tasks of self-management.

Following the October Revolution, Maksimov participated in the First All Russian Congress of Trade Unions, where delegates of the Bolsheviks and Mensheviks resolved to integrate the anarcho-syndicalist factory committees into the state-controlled trade unions. Maksimov objected, crediting the factory committees for the overthrow of capitalism and the Tsarist autocracy, and cited Karl Marx's appeals for a permanent revolution against the state, even declaring himself a better Marxist than the Marxists themselves. Maksimov rebuffed the claims of David Riazanov, who favoured the trade unions, dismissing him as a "white-handed intellectual who had never worked, never sweated, never felt life." But despite Maksimov's objections, the Bolshevik-majority Congress voted to dissolve the factory committees and to convert them into organs of the state's trade union apparatus.

In Golos truda, Maksimov denounced the centralisation of industry by the Bolshevik party and declared that Russian anarchists should oppose the Soviets, as they were by this time under the control of the state. When there was a subsequent flare-up of terrorism by the anarcho-communists, he condemned their violent tactics, arguing that they shifted revolutionary energy away from organised action. Political repression followed soon after, with the Bolshevik government closing down Golos truda in May 1918.

In August 1918, Maksimov participated in the First All-Russian Conference of Anarcho-Syndicalists, which was held in Moscow. The conference was fiercely critical of the Bolshevik government, which it denounced as a regime of "state capitalism". To express the anarcho-syndicalist critique, the conference also established a new newspaper, Volny golos truda, which was edited by Maksimov. But the critical articles published in this paper quickly resulted in it being shut down. Despite this setback, in November 1918, the syndicalists were able to convene a second congress, which resolved to form a nationwide anarcho-syndicalist confederation. The conference elected Maksimov as secretary of an Executive Bureau that would form this confederation.

During the subsequent period, Maksimov attempted to organise food workers into underground factory committees, which he hoped would form the nucleus of a nationwide General Confederation of Labor. In March 1920, Maksimov spoke at the Second All-Russian Congress of Food-Industry Workers, which adopted his resolution that denounced the Bolshevik's "dictatorship over the proletariat" and called for the establishment of free soviets. Although his own organising efforts resulted in little success on this front, Maksimov's idea for a decentralised workers' confederation was taken up by the workers' opposition, led by Alexandra Kollontai.

In November 1920, during a wave of political repression against the anarchist movement, Maksimov was arrested by the Cheka and held in custody for weeks. Following the outbreak of the Kronstadt rebellion, the 10th Bolshevik Party Congress declared a ban on factions, suppressing the workers' opposition and imprisoning Maksimov. In order to draw the attention of visiting European syndicalists, who had arrived in Moscow for the first congress of the Profintern, Maksimov and his fellow anarchist inmates in Taganka prison staged a hunger strike. The resulting protest forced the Soviet government to release the prisoners, on condition that they immediately leave the country. In January 1922, Maksimov left for Berlin.

In their German exile, the anarcho-syndicalists founded a new newspaper called Rabochii put' (English: The Workers' Way), printed using the presses of the Free Workers' Union of Germany (FAUD). Out of a reaction to the disorganisation of the Russian anarchist movement, Maksimov and his fellow emigrants resolved to establish an international syndicalist organisation, together with their foreign comrades. In December 1922, they established the International Workers' Association (IWA).

After a brief stay in Paris, in 1925, he moved to the Chicago, where he hung wallpaper and edited Golos truzhenika, the Russian language organ of the Industrial Workers of the World (IWW). Following Peter Arshinov's defection to the Soviet Union, Maksimov also took up editing Delo truda, which took a notedly more syndicalist stance under his stewardship. During his time in the United States, Maksimov attempted to reconcile the syndicalist and communist factions of the anarchist movement. In 1933, he published a "Social Credo" that synthesised the two tendencies, drawing from the works of Peter Kropotkin. He called for the IWA to form agricultural cooperatives and factory committees in order to transform the economy, as part of a transition towards communism.

In 1940, he merged Delo truda with the Detroit-based journal Probuzhdenie, which kept him busy as its editor. During the 1940s, he also wrote a history of Soviet political repression and compiled a collection of the Mikhail Bakunin's works.

On 16 March 1950, Grigorii Petrovich Maksimov died of a heart attack. He is interred in Waldheim Cemetery, near other Chicago anarchists.

== Selected works ==
- Sovety rabochikh, soldatskikh, i krest'ianskikh deputatov i nashe k nim otnoshenie. (The Soviets of Workers', Soldiers' and Peasants' Deputies and Our Relations with Them) New York: Soiuz russkikh rabochikh, 1918.
- Constructive anarchism: The Debate on the Platform (1927)
- My social credo (1933)
- Russian anarchists’ manifesto: For a free Russia! (1934)
- Bolshevism: Promises and Reality (1935)
- On the Russian Counter-Revolution (1935)
- Anarchists and Bolsheviks in the Spanish Revolution (1938)
- The Guillotine at Work: Twenty Years of Terror in Russia (1940)
- The Political Philosophy of Bakunin: Scientific Anarchism (1953, editor)
- Program of Anarcho-Syndicalism [2015]

== See also ==
- Fanya Baron
- Alexander Berkman
- Emma Goldman
- Nestor Makhno
- Volin

== Bibliography ==
- Avrich, Paul (1971) [1967]. The Russian Anarchists. Princeton: Princeton University Press. ISBN 0-691-00766-7. OCLC 1154930946.
- Avrich, Paul (1995). Anarchist Voices: An Oral History of Anarchism in America. Princeton: Princeton University Press. p. 491. ISBN 978-0-691-03412-6. OCLC 68772773.
- Darch, Colin (2020). Nestor Makhno and Rural Anarchism in Ukraine, 1917-1921. London: Pluto Press. ISBN 9781786805263. OCLC 1225942343.
- Malet, Michael (1982). Nestor Makhno in the Russian Civil War. London: Palgrave Macmillan. ISBN 978-0-333-25969-6. OCLC 8514426.
- van der Walt, Lucien; Schmidt, Michael (2009). Black Flame: The Revolutionary Class Politics of Anarchism and Syndicalism. Edinburgh: AK Press. pp. 239–270. ISBN 978-1-904859-16-1. LCCN 2006933558. OCLC 1100238201.
