= Mollie Steimer =

Ukrainian anarchist activist (1897–1980)

- מאלי שטיימער
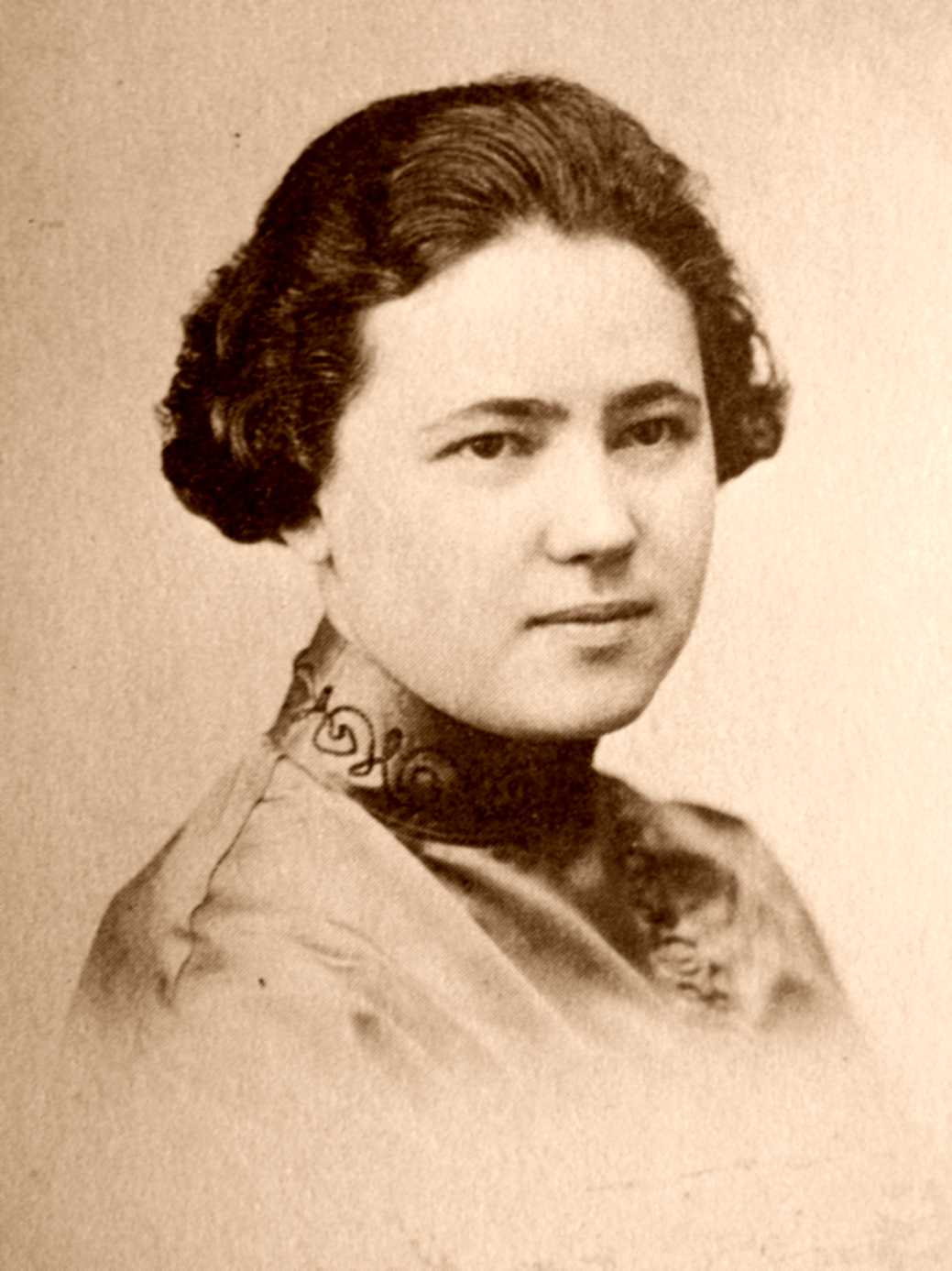
- Steimer in 1919
- Born: November 21, 1897; Dunaivtsi, Podilia, Russian Empire
- Died: July 23, 1980 (aged 82); Cuernavaca, Morelos, Mexico
- Citizenship: Russian Empire (until 1913); United States (1913–1921); Soviet Russia (1921–1923); Stateless (1923–1948); Mexico (from 1948)
- Occupations: Writer; photographer
- Years active: 1917–1963
- Known for: Opposition to World War I; prisoner support
- Movement: Anarchism
- Partner: Senya Fleshin

Mollie Steimer (Ukrainian: Моллі Штаймер; November 21, 1897 – July 23, 1980) was an anarchist activist. A Ukrainian Jew, she left Russia and settled in New York City in 1913. She quickly became involved in the local anarchist movement and was caught up in the case of Abrams v. United States. Charged with sedition, she was eventually deported to Soviet Russia, where she met her lifelong partner Senya Fleshin and agitated for the rights of anarchist political prisoners in the country. For her activities, she and Fleshin were again deported to western Europe, where they spent time organising aid for exiles and political prisoners, and took part in the debates of the international anarchist movement. Following the rise of the Nazis in Europe, she and Fleshin fled to Mexico, where they spent the rest of their lives working as photographers.

== Early life and activism ==
On November 21, 1897, Mollie Steimer was born in Dunaivtsi, a village in the south-west of the Russian Empire. At the age of 15, she and her family emigrated to the United States, settling in a ghetto of New York City and setting to work at a garment factory. At this time, she started to read radical political literature, such as Women and Socialism by August Bebel and Underground Russia by Sergey Stepnyak-Kravchinsky.

By the outbreak of the Russian Revolution in 1917, Steimer had gravitated towards anarchism, inspired by the works of the Russian anarchists Mikhail Bakunin, Peter Kropotkin and Emma Goldman. Together with other Jewish anarchists, Steimer helped form a clandestine collective called Der Shturm ("The Storm"), which published radical works in the Yiddish language. Following some internal conflict, in January 1918, the group reorganized and launched a new monthly journal titled Frayhayt ("Freedom"), which published articles by Jewish radicals such as Georg Brandes and Maria Goldsmith. The journal's motto was a Henry David Thoreau quote: "That government is best which governs not at all" (Yiddish: Yene regirung iz di beste, velkhe regirt in gantsn nit).

Several of the collective's members, including Steimer, lived and worked together in a six-room apartment on Harlem's East 104th Street. Due to the political repression brought by the Espionage Act of 1917 and the tense political climate that preceded the First Red Scare, the collective was forced to distribute Frayhayt in secret, as it had been among the papers banned by the federal government for its anti-war and far-left political stances. By the summer of 1918, the group had drawn the attention of the authorities after they had begun distributing leaflets denouncing the allied intervention in the Russian Civil War and calling for a social revolution in the United States by means of a general strike.

== Arrest, trial and imprisonment ==
Steimer herself distributed thousands of leaflets around New York. On August 23, 1918, she distributed copies around the factory she worked in and threw a handful of the leaflets out of an upper window, which alerted the police. Steimer was arrested after police received information from an informant within the Frayhayt group. Their apartment was subsequently raided and a number of their other members were arrested, on charges of conspiracy, under the Sedition Act of 1918. During their trial, which came to be known as the case of Abrams v. United States, Steimer gave a speech in which she declared:

By anarchism, I understand a new social order, where no group of people shall be governed by another group of people. Individual freedom shall prevail in the full sense of the word. Private ownership shall be abolished. Every person shall have an equal opportunity to develop himself well, both mentally and physically. We shall not have to struggle for our daily existence as we do now. No one shall live on the product of others. Every person shall produce as much as he can, and enjoy as much as he needs—receive according to his need. Instead of striving to get money, we shall strive towards education, towards knowledge. While at present the people of the world are divided into various groups, calling themselves nations, while one nation defies another — in most cases considers the others as competitive — we, the workers of the world, shall stretch out our hands towards each other with brotherly love. To the fulfillment of this idea I shall devote all my energy, and, if necessary, render my life for it.

On October 25, 1918, Steimer and her co-defendants were found guilty, with Steimer herself being sentenced to 15 years in prison and a $500 fine (equivalent to $11,000 in 2025). With support from both radicals and liberals, notably including Zechariah Chafee and other legal scholars of Harvard University, the sentence was appealed and the defendants were released on bail. Steimer returned to activism, for which she was arrested multiple times over the following year. On March 11, 1919, during a police raid against the Russian People's House on New York's East 15th Street, Steimer was arrested on charges of incitement and subsequently transferred to Ellis Island. Following a hunger strike against the conditions of her solitary confinement, Steimer was released before she could be deported, although the government kept her under surveillance. Back in New York, she met Emma Goldman, with whom she developed a lifelong friendship.

On October 30, 1919, Steimer was arrested again and imprisoned on Blackwell's Island. For six months, she was again held in solitary confinement, which she likewise protested with another hunger strike and by loudly singing revolutionary songs. When the Supreme Court upheld her conviction, her co-defendants informed her of a plan to flee the country into exile, but Steimer herself refused to cooperate, as she did not want to dishonor the workers who had paid her $40,000 in bail (equivalent to $743,000 in 2025). In April 1920, Steimer was transferred to Jefferson City, Missouri, where she was held for a year and a half. For her penal labor, she was required to manufacture 100 jackets per day. She found this task difficult, injuring her arm while attempting to fulfil the quota, but persevered to not bring "further persecution" against her family.

During her time in prison, Steimer's brother died from influenza and her father from shock. She attempted to support her mother and surviving siblings, but her appeal for compassionate release was rejected by the Supreme Court. Instead, the Workers' Defense Union established a relief fund in her name, raising $1,000 (equivalent to $21,000 in 2025) for her family.

On August 22, 1920, two years after her arrest for anti-war agitation, she celebrated news of an international mass strike against the allied intervention in the Russian Civil War, declaring: "At last our great hope, our beautiful ideal of international workers solidarity for the coming good of humanity, is coming true!" She also wrote letters inquiring about the condition of her fellow imprisoned anarchists, although she remained pessimistic about the possibility of their release.

Her lawyer managed to secure her release, on the condition of her deportation. But she initially refused to accept this, due to her staunch opposition to state borders and her concern for fellow political prisoners of the United States. Nevertheless, after some convincing, she arrived back at Ellis Island, where she eagerly awaited her chance to participate in the Russian Revolution.

== Deportation and exile ==
On November 24, 1921, Steimer and her co-defendants were deported to the Russian Soviet Republic on the Estonia. By the time they arrived in Moscow, on December 15, 1921, they found that the Russian anarchist movement had been thoroughly repressed. Emma Goldman had left for exile, Peter Kropotkin had died of old age and both the Kronstadt rebellion and the Makhnovist movement had been suppressed by the Red Army, while hundreds more anarchists were still held in the prisons of the Cheka. Despite the climate of political repression, Steimer made a new home in Petrograd, where she met and fell in love with Senya Fleshin, a veteran of the Makhnovist movement. Together they established an organization to aid political prisoners in Russia, for which they were arrested on November 1, 1922, and sentenced to exile in Siberia. But after they carried out a hunger strike, they were released on November 18, on the condition that they remain in Petrograd and report regularly to the authorities. Despite these conditions, they continued their activities, and were again arrested on July 9, 1923. Following another hunger strike and protests made to Leon Trotsky by anarcho-syndicalist delegates of the Profintern, they were again released, although this time they were to be deported. When ACLU founder Roger Nash Baldwin received news of Steimer's treatment, he declared himself "moved humanly to condemn both governments involved [the United States and Soviet Union] and to give her such aid as I can."

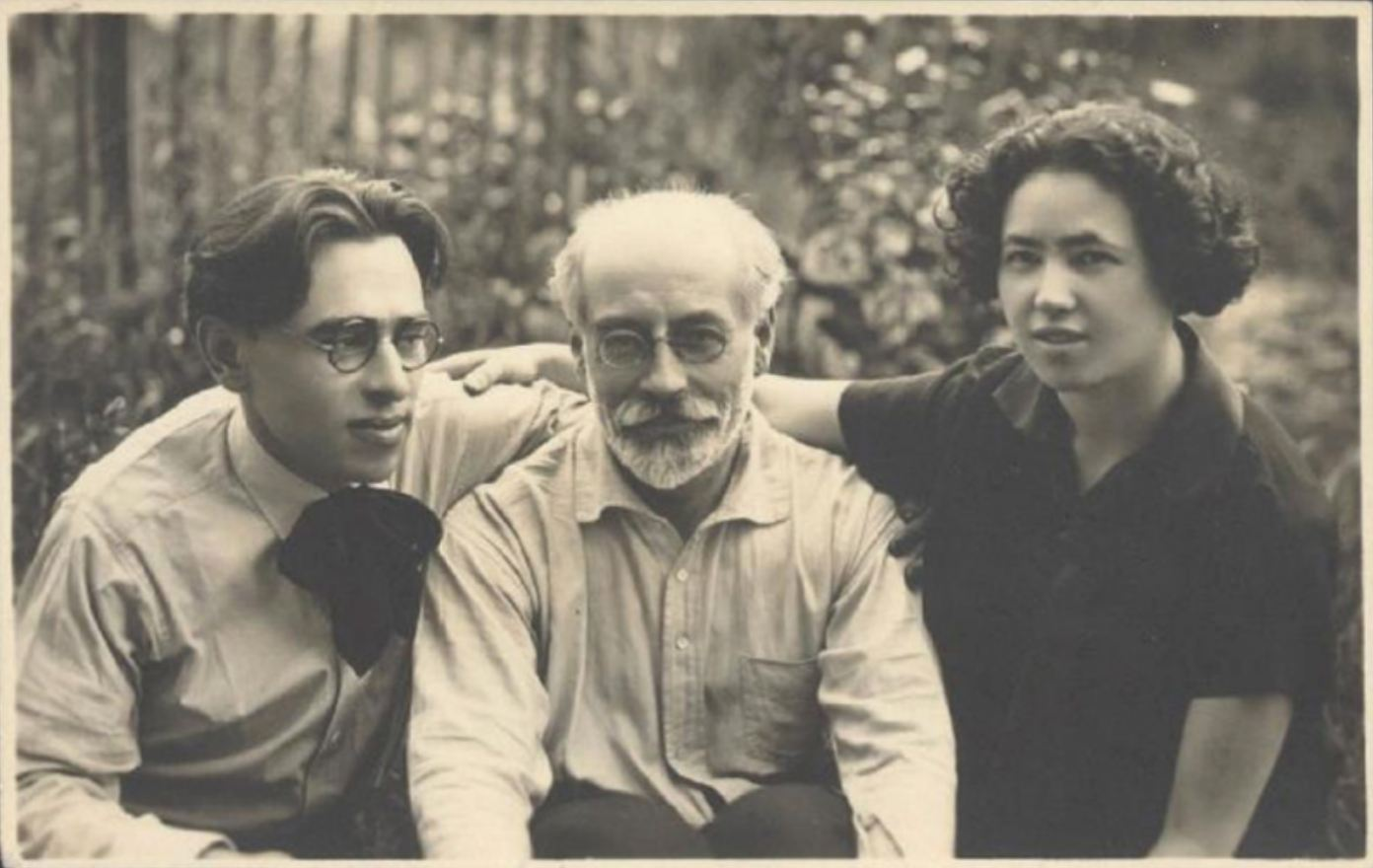
Mollie Steimer (right) with her partner Senya Fleshin (left) and their friend Volin (center)

On September 27, 1923, Steimer and Fleshin were deported to Germany, where they were reunited with Emma Goldman and Alexander Berkman in Berlin. From the German capital, Steimer wrote articles about her experiences in Russia for the British anarchist newspaper Freedom, to which she denounced the authoritarianism of the Communist Party. The couple also continued their activities in aiding Soviet political prisoners, now as members of the International Workers' Association. In 1924, they joined their fellow exile Volin to Paris, where they established a mutual aid society for anarchist exiles from all countries and participated in the debate around the Platform, which Steimer criticised as authoritarian. During this period, Steimer also met a number of other anarchists, including Harry Kelly, Rose Pesotta, Rudolf Rocker and Milly Witkop, and was briefly reunited with her co-defendants Jack and Mary Abrams, who had also left Russia out of disillusionment with the Revolution.

In 1929, the couple briefly returned to Berlin, where Fleshin worked as a photographer. However, following the ascent to power of Adolf Hitler's Nazi Party in 1933, they returned to Paris to escape rising antisemitism. In the wake of the invasion of France by Nazi Germany, on May 18, 1940, Steimer was sent to a concentration camp, on account of her Jewish heritage and her anarchist political beliefs. She remained at Camp Gurs for six months before finally being released. She then fled south from Nazi-occupied France to the area controlled by the collaborationist French State. Once she was reunited with Fleshin in Marseille, the couple escaped across the Atlantic to Mexico.

== Later life ==
In Mexico City, the couple operated a photographic studio, became close with a group of Spanish anarchist exiles and were once again reunited with Jack and Mary Abrams. In 1963, Steimer and Fleshin retired to Cuernavaca, where they kept up with the development of the international anarchist movement and received visitors from the United States. In the late 1970s, Steimer was interviewed by a number of film crews about Emma Goldman and her anarchist convictions, to which she remained a stalwart into her old age.

Steimer died of heart failure in her Cuernavaca home on July 23, 1980, aged 82. Fleshin died less than a year later.

== See also ==
- Anarchist Black Cross

== Bibliography ==
- Avrich, Paul (1988). "Mollie Steimer: An Anarchist Life". Anarchist Portraits. Princeton University Press. pp. 214–226. ISBN 0-691-00609-1.
- Marsh, Margaret S. (1981). "True Freedom: Anarchist Womanhood". Anarchist Women, 1870–1920. Temple University Press. pp. 19–45. ISBN 978-0-87722-202-6. OCLC 708544972.
- Polenberg, Richard (1999) [1987]. Fighting Faiths: The Abrams Case, the Supreme Court, and Free Speech. Cornell University Press. ISBN 0-8014-8618-1. OCLC 42275046.
- Stone, Geoffrey R. (2004). Perilous Times: Free Speech in Wartime from the Sedition Act of 1798 to the War on Terrorism. W. W. Norton & Company. ISBN 978-0-393-05880-2.
- Szajkowski, Zosa (1971). "Double Jeopardy - The Abrams Case of 1919" (PDF). The American Jewish Archives Journal. 23 (1): 6–32. ISSN 0002-905X. OCLC 840433682.
