= Delo truda =

Anarchist magazine established 1925

- Editor: Peter Arshinov (1925-1930); Grigorii Maksimov (1930-1950)
- Categories: Politics
- Frequency: Bimonthly
- First issue: 1925
- Final issue: 1950
- Country: France (1925-1930); United States (1930-1950)
- Language: Russian
- OCLC: 20578018

The Cause of Labor (Russian: Дело труда, romanized: Delo truda) was a libertarian communist magazine published by exiled Russian and Ukrainian anarchists. Initially under the editorship of Peter Arshinov, after it published the Organizational Platform, the subsequent controversy resulted in his exit from the anarchist movement. The magazine was then picked up by Grigorii Maksimov, who moved it to the United States and edited it until his death in 1950.

== History ==
In 1925, Delo truda was founded in Paris by Peter Arshinov and Nestor Makhno, two former confederates of the Makhnovist movement, which had attempted to establish libertarian communism in Ukraine. Ida Mett was brought on as the magazine's secretary and typist, serving until 1927. Maria Goldsmith then took over as secretary, until her suicide in 1933.

From 1926 to 1929, Makhno published a series of articles in Delo truda that covered a range of topics about the Makhnovshchina, from refutations against allegations of antisemitism to theoretical articles about the state and revolution. He also penned criticisms of the Bolsheviks and issued appeals to aid anarchist political prisoners in the Soviet Union through the Anarchist Black Cross. Makhno's articles were often written in a confusing polemical manner, to the frustration of Arshinov, who as editor had to constantly make revisions and corrections, which became a point of contention between the two.

In June 1926, Delo truda published its Organisation Platform, written by Arshinov with contributions from Makhno. The Platform proposed the formation of a "general union of anarchists", with a central executive committee, that would be able to overcome the disorganisation of the anarchist movement. The publication of the Platform caused an immediate split within the anarchist movement, as anarchists such as Volin and Alexander Berkman issued sharp criticisms of it for its centralist and authoritarian tendencies. In 1930, a discussion of the Platform was held at the 10th congress of the Union of Revolutionary Anarchist-Communists, in which Volin's anti-Platformist faction won out. Later that year, Arshinov joined the Communist Party and before long had returned to the Soviet Union, leaving Delo truda in the hands of Grigorii Maksimov, who transferred the magazine to the United States.

With the magazine relocated to Chicago, it shifted ideologically towards anarcho-syndicalism, while still keeping its pages open for contributions from anarchists of other tendencies. In 1940, the magazine was merged with the Detroit-based anarchist magazine Probuzhdenie, which Maximoff edited until his death in 1950.

== See also ==
- Anarchism in France
- Makhnovshchina

== Bibliography ==
- Avrich, Paul (1971) [1967]. The Russian Anarchists. Princeton: Princeton University Press. ISBN 0-691-00766-7. OCLC 1154930946.
- Darch, Colin (2020). Nestor Makhno and Rural Anarchism in Ukraine, 1917-1921. London: Pluto Press. ISBN 9781786805263. OCLC 1225942343.
- Malet, Michael (1982). Nestor Makhno in the Russian Civil War. London: Palgrave Macmillan. ISBN 978-0-333-25969-6. OCLC 8514426.
- Peters, Victor (1970). Nestor Makhno: The Life of an Anarchist. Winnipeg: Echo Books. OCLC 7925080.
- Skirda, Alexandre (2002). Facing the enemy: A history of anarchist organisation. Translated by Sharkey, Paul. Oakland: AK Press. ISBN 1902593197. OCLC 490977034.
- Skirda, Alexandre (2004). Nestor Makhno–Anarchy's Cossack: The Struggle for Free Soviets in the Ukraine 1917–1921. Translated by Sharkey, Paul. Oakland, CA: AK Press. ISBN 1-902593-68-5. OCLC 60602979.
- van der Walt, Lucien; Schmidt, Michael (2009). Black Flame: The Revolutionary Class Politics of Anarchism and Syndicalism. Edinburgh: AK Press. pp. 239–270. ISBN 978-1-904859-16-1. LCCN 2006933558. OCLC 1100238201.
