= Senya Fleshin =

Ukrainian anarchist (1894–1981)

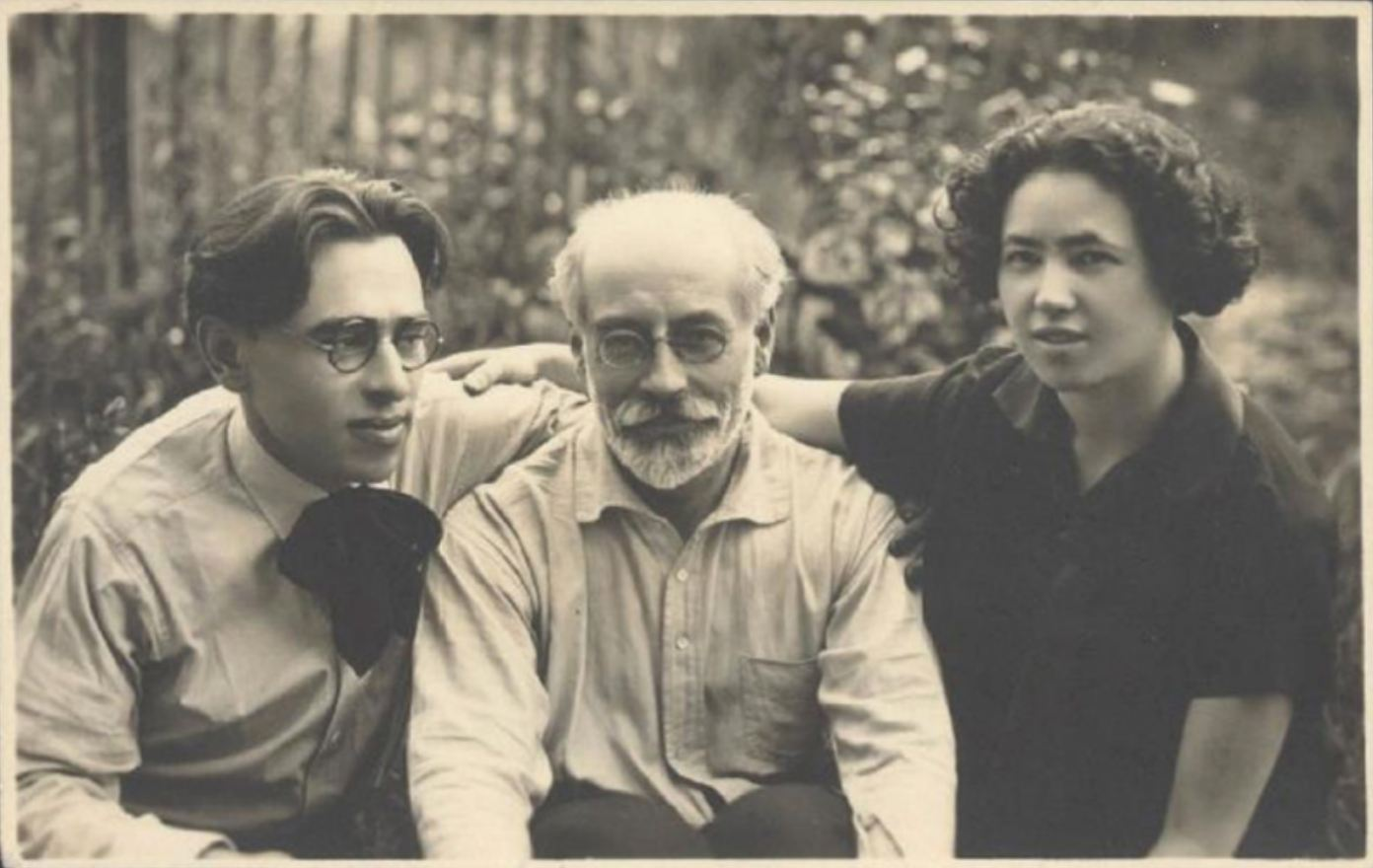
Senya Fleshin (left), Volin (center) and Mollie Steimer (right).

Senya Fleshin (19 December 1894 – 19 June 1981) was a Ukrainian anarchist revolutionary and photographer.

== Early life ==
Senya Fleshin was born in Kiev on 19 December 1894. When he was 16 his family emigrated to the United States and settled in New York City. He worked for Mother Earth, an anarchist journal published by Emma Goldman.

== Life in Soviet Russia ==
In 1917 Fleshin returned to Russia to take part in the Russian Revolution, where he had an affair with Louise Berger, another of Goldman's Mother Earth employees who had voluntarily decided to return to Russia, and who had accompanied him on the voyage. Fleshin was soon in conflict with the Bolshevik government; Berger eventually left him and went to Odessa to join a group of naletchiki (armed bandits) carrying out 'bank expropriations'. When Fleshin wrote an article criticizing Bolshevist government policies, he was arrested and imprisoned.

Soon after being released he met Molly Steimer, an anarchist who had been deported from the United States. Angered by the communists' suppression of the Russian anarchist movement, Senya and Molly organized the Society to Help Anarchist Prisoners, traveling to assist incarcerated comrades. On 1 November 1922, the two were themselves arrested by the Soviet secret police on charges of "aiding criminal elements in Russia" (i.e. assisting other anarchists) and "maintaining ties with anarchists abroad" (they had been corresponding with Berkman and Goldman, then in Berlin).

Sentenced to two years' exile in a Siberian labor camp by Soviet authorities, Fleshin and Steimer declared a hunger strike on 17 November in jail in Petrograd jail, and released the next day. They were forbidden, however, to leave the city and were ordered to report to the authorities every forty-eight hours. Before long, the couple had resumed their efforts on behalf of their imprisoned comrades. On 9 July 1923, police raided their apartment and they were again placed under arrest, charged with propagating anarchist ideas, in violation of Art. 60–63 of the Soviet Criminal Code. Sequestered from their fellow prisoners, Fleshin and Steimer again declared a hunger strike. Protests to Leon Trotsky by foreign anarcho-syndicalist delegates, including Emma Goldman, who wrote a personal letter of protest to a congress of the Red International of Trade Unions (Profintern) eventually brought about their release. This time, however, they were notified of their impending expulsion from the country. On 27 September 1923, Fleshin and Steimer were officially deported, and placed aboard a ship bound for Germany.

== Later career ==
Together with Molly Steimer, Fleshin opened a photographic studio in Berlin. Fleshin was active in the Joint Committee for the Defense of Revolutionaries (1923–26), and the Relief Fund of the International Working Men's Association for Anarchists (1926–32).

When Hitler came to power, Fleshin and Molly Steimer were forced to flee to Paris. On 18 May 1940, Steimer was arrested by the French government and interned at Camp Gurs.

After seven weeks of imprisonment, Steimer, aided by French anarchist friends, including May Picqueray, editor of Le Réfractaire, managed to escape Camp Gurs during its chaotic turnover to Vichy control. Picqueray helped smuggle Fleshin and Steimer out of the country to Mexico, where they settled, running a photography studio.

== Death ==
Fleshin died in Mexico City, on 19 June 1981 at the age of 86.

== Bibliography ==
- Avrich, Paul (1988). "Mollie Steimer: An Anarchist Life". Anarchist Portraits. Princeton University Press. pp. 214–226. ISBN 0-691-00609-1.
- Polenberg, Richard (1999) [1987]. Fighting Faiths: The Abrams Case, the Supreme Court, and Free Speech. Cornell University Press. ISBN 0-8014-8618-1. OCLC 42275046.
