= Union of Russian Workers =

Anarchist association in the United States in early 20th Century

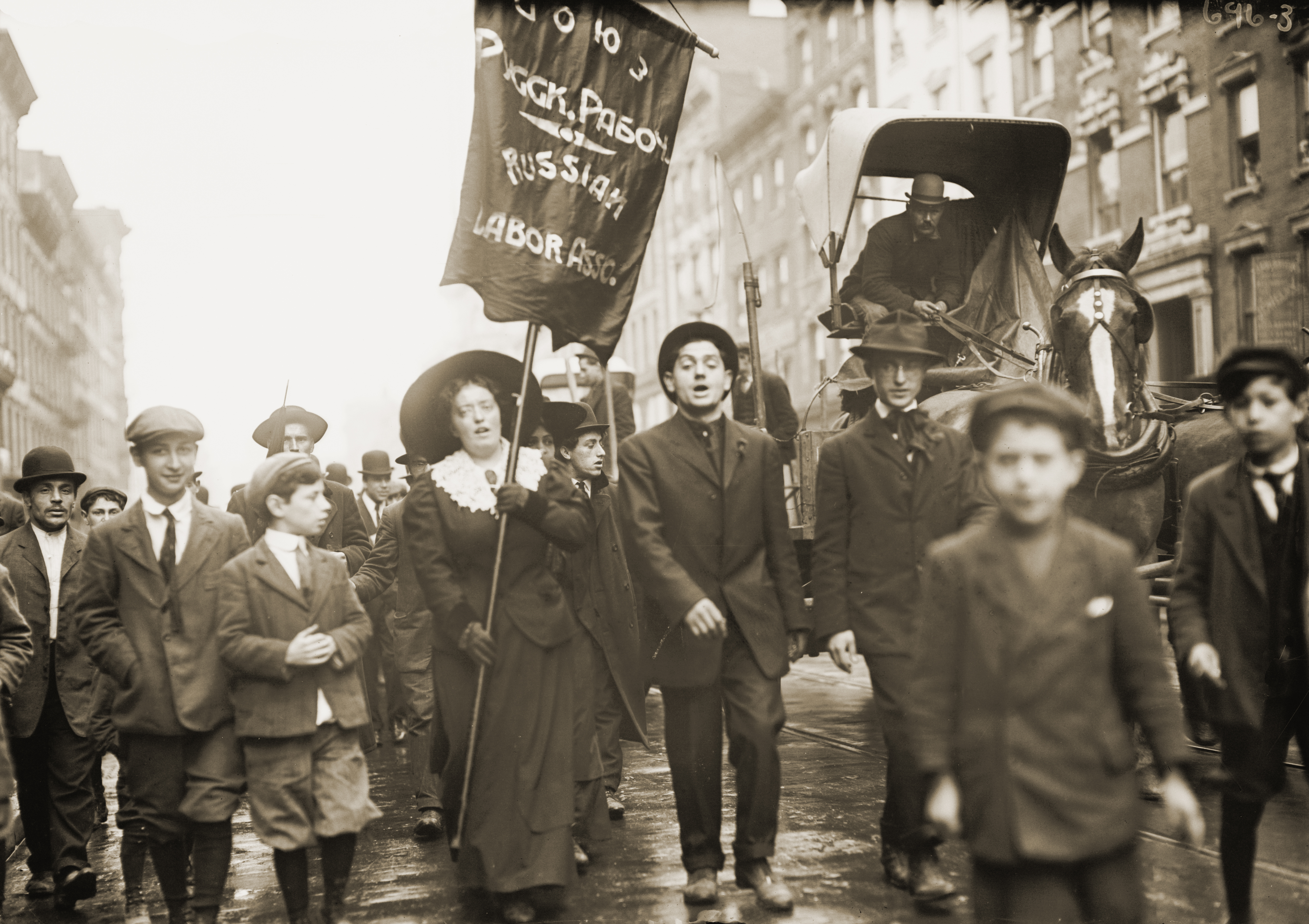
1909 May Day demonstration of members and supporters of the Union of Russian Workers, New York City.

The Union of Russian Workers in the United States and Canada, commonly known as the "Union of Russian Workers" (Союз Русских Рабочих, Soiuz Russkikh Rabochikh) was an anarcho-syndicalist union of Russian emigrants in the United States. The group was established shortly after the failure of the Russian Revolution of 1905 and was essentially annihilated in America by the 1919 Red Scare in which it was targeted by the Bureau of Investigation of the U.S. Department of Justice. Thousands of the group's adherents were arrested and hundreds deported in 1919 and 1920; still more voluntarily returned to Soviet Russia. During its brief existence the organization, which was only loosely affiliated with the Industrial Workers of the World, published numerous books and pamphlets in Russian by anarchist writers, operated reading rooms and conducted courses to teach newly arrived Russians English, and fulfilled a social function for emigrants half a world from home.

== Organizational history ==
=== Formation and development ===
The Union of Russian Workers (URW) was established in New York City in 1908 by refugees from the defeated Russian Revolution of 1905. By 1917, URW achieved a membership of about 10,000 members in 50 chapters across the United States.

The Union of Russian Workers fulfilled not only a political but also a social function for its members. New York URW branch, circa 1917.

The URW's declaration of principles called for the unification of Russian workers in the United States and Canada so that they might do battle against capitalism and the forces of authority. The group further declared itself in favor of supporting the struggles of non-Russian workers in America and the struggle for liberation from Tsarism in Russia as well. Although in its initial phase the organization promoted the philosophy of communist anarchism, over time the ideology of the group evolved until in 1912 it declared itself for anarcho-syndicalism.

In large measure through the efforts of Bill Shatoff, a Russian-born anarcho-syndicalist who worked for a time on the staff of the URW's newspaper, Golos Truda (The Voice of Labor), the URW developed close ties with the Industrial Workers of the World.

In addition to publishing books and pamphlets on anarchist and syndicalist themes, the Union of Russian workers additionally provided and educational and social function, maintaining reading libraries, conducting classes to teach the English language to newcomers from Russia, and providing a setting for socialization of Russian speaking emigrants with their fellows.

=== Destruction ===
Political turmoil swept Europe in the years after World War I. The Bolshevik government of Soviet Russia showed every sign of beating the odds and retaining power. Additional communist uprisings dotted the map, including serious efforts in Finland, Hungary, and Germany. In America, the Left wing of the Socialist Party of America began to organize itself, proclaiming the need for revolutionary socialism in the United States. Politicians, press, and citizens on the street alike began to feel concerned about the potential for armed insurrection in America itself.

The Union of Russian Workers, small and isolated though it may have been, was seen by some as a source of the revolutionary contagion. On March 12, 1919, police raided headquarters of the organization, located on the Lower East Side and arrested 162 people. Although at the time of the raid Detective Sergeant James Gegan of the New York City police department's "Bomb Squad" labeled the group "a front for alien subversive activity," results of the operation were ultimately rather less definitive, as only four of those arrested were ultimately charged with "criminal anarchy."

Fear still lingered. On June 8, 1919, the influential New York Times declared in an article spanning four columns that "500 Russian Reds" of the Union of Russian Workers were "agents spreading Bolshevism in the United States." Citing the constitution of the URW at length, the article breathlessly declared

An organization directly connected with Russia is at work in the United States with an underground propaganda for overthrow of the Government by force. * * *

Traces of the activity of the organization have been found from New York to San Francisco. ... The agitation has been chiefly among the Slav races, but Scandinavians and the representatives of other European races in this country have been subjects of the underground campaign. The main instrument of the propaganda is literature which calls for the overturn of government by violence, asserting that there is no moral wrong in accomplishing revolution by bloodshed.

The literature is distributed at meetings and handed individually at other places to those whom it is thought are ready to give hearing to the measures advocated. ... From the traces of their activity it is estimated that there are not less than 500 propagandists of the Russian Workers' Union in this country.

With public opinion thus prepared, Federal authorities headed by Attorney General A. Mitchell Palmer in an operation conducted by his "special assistant," J. Edgar Hoover, launched a coordinated campaign in over 30 cities across America on the night of November 7/8, 1919 — the second anniversary of the Bolshevik revolution. At 8:45 in the evening of November 7, 1919, dozens of plainclothes and uniformed members of the New York Police Department together with Federal law enforcement authorities swept down on the "People's House" located at 133 East 15th Street, headquarters of the Union of Russian Workers, in what one reporter characterized as "one of the most brutal raids ever witnessed in the city." A report in the socialist New York Call melodramatically recounted the violence of the scene:

Peter Bianki, top leader of the Union of Russian Workers, was deported with Emma Goldman on the U.S.A.T. Buford in 1920.

A witness of the event said that he saw one of the Russians trying to rush out of the building, his face and clothing covered with blood. Agonized cries were heard.

One who was close to the scene while the raiders were covering themselves with the blood of men and women against whom no crime had been charged heard heavy thuds as of clubs descending on human flesh.

All who attempted to escape were driven back into the building, and none but officers were permitted to enter. Two Call reporters who attempted to gather the facts of the assault were threatened with arrest if they did not leave at once. One policeman on the stoop of the building shouted to the crowd that had collected outside: 'If there's a soldier among you, get after them!' * * *

They were beaten, not only with clubs, but with blackjacks. After the police and other guardians of law had their fill of clubbing and blackjacking, they crowded the Russians together in the back of the hall and cross-examined them. Then they bandaged the heads of those who had suffered more than others, but even the bandages were heavily bloodstained. Meanwhile, patrol wagons which had been stationed in the neighborhood came clanging up and were filled as fast as they appeared with the Russians who had been beaten up. Most of them had their heads bandaged.

They were thrown down steps of the stoop without ceremony. One of them moaned loudly and the crowd outside mimicked him. The crowd was not permitted to approach too closely and a Call reporter was unable to see what marks had been made by the clubs of the police on the faces of the assaulted men and women.

After taking nearly 100 of those present to police headquarters for questioning, 50 men and 2 women were held for possible deportation as "undesirable aliens."

=== Deportation via the USAT Buford ===
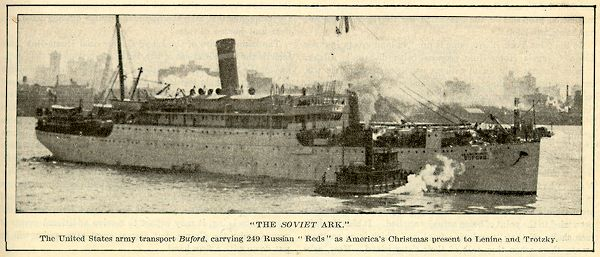
The United States Transport Buford, which deported 249 non-citizen immigrant political prisoners in December 1919.

According to the report of the head of the Bureau of Immigration, Anthony Caminetti, a total of 351 aliens "of anarchist and kindred classes" were deported from the United States from July 1, 1918, to June 30, 1920. Of these political deportations, the vast majority were made at one time aboard the USAT Buford, which departed from New York harbor on December 21, 1919, carrying 249 involuntary passengers. Chief among these were members of the Union of Russian Workers arrested in the series of raids conducted in the fall of 1919.

== Notable members ==
- Volin
- Peter Bianki
- Vladimir "Bill" Shatoff

== Publications ==
=== Newspapers ===
The URW issued a newspaper called Golos Truda [Voice of Labor] in New York City beginning in 1911. Following the Russian Revolution of 1917, the editors returned home together to begin publishing the paper there. A new official Union of Russian Workers newspaper was launched in New York on February 26, 1919, Khleb i volia [Bread and Freedom], edited by G.V. Karpuk. According to documents seized by the Lusk Committee, the paid circulation of the latter publication was 4,547 in 1919.

=== Books and pamphlets ===
- Errico Malatesta: V kafeine. [At the Cafe.] New York: Soiuz Russkikh Rabochikh, 1916.
- Tovarishch, ne izmeniai: Uveshchanie shtreikbrekhera. [Comrade, Don't Be Unfaithful: Admonition to a Strikebreaker.] New York: Soiuz Russkikh Rabochikh, 1916.
- Sébastien Faure: Prestuplenie Boga. [The Crimes of God.] New York: Soiuz Russkikh Rabochikh, 1917.
- Mikhail Aleksandrovich Bakunin: Bog i gosudarstvo. [God and State.] New York: Soiuz Russkikh Rabochikh, 1918.
- Grigorii Petrovich Maksimov: Sovety rabochikh, soldatskikh, i krest'ianskikh deputatov i nashe k nim otnoshenie. [The Soviets of Workers', Soldiers' and Peasants' Deputies and Our Relations with Them] New York: Soiuz Russkikh Rabochikh, 1918.
- Paul Bertolet: Novoe evengelie. [The New Evangelism.] New York: Soiuz Russkikh Rabochikh, n.d. [c. 1918].
- Petr Alekseevich Kropotkin: Khleb i volia. [Bread and Freedom.] New York: Soiuz Russkikh Rabochikh, 1919.
- Petr Alekseevich Kropotkin: Nravstvennaia nachala anarchizma. [The Moral Origins of Anarchism.] New York: Federatsiia Russkikh Rabochikh Soed. Shtatov i Kanady, 1919.
- Novomirskii: Manifest anarkhistov-kommunistov. [Manifesto of the Communist-Anarchists.] New York: Federatsiia Russkikh Rabochikh Soed. Shtatov i Kanady, 1919.
- Matrena Prisiazhniuk, Rech' Matreny Prisiazhniuk v Kievskomu Voenno-Okruzhnom sude 19-go iiulia 1908 goda. (Speech of Matrena Prisizahniuk in the Kiev Military District Court, July 19, 1908.) New York: Izdanie Federatsii Soiuzov Russkikh Rabochikh Soed. Shtatov i Kanady, 1919.
- M. Berezin, Kontr-revoliutsionery li my? [Are We Counter-Revolutionaries?] n.c.: A.K., n.d. (c. 1919).
- Pereval, Bezgosudarstvennyi kommunizm i sindikalizm. [Stateless Communism and Syndicalism] n.c.: A.K., n.d. (c. 1919).
