= Factory committee =

Factory committees (Russian: zavodskoy komitet, zavkom, заводской комитет, завком, fabrichny komitet, fabkom, фабричный комитет, фабком) were workers' councils representing factory workers in the history of Russia and Soviet Union that accomplished workers' control in various forms.

== Russian Revolution of 1917 and afterwards ==
Factory committees sprang up during the Russian Revolution of 1917. These committees were varied in origin and purpose, at times acting in a supervisory role over management, in other instances engaging in matters of collective bargaining and worker representation, and in some instances acting as rudimentary organs of workers' control.

While the majority of factory committees fulfilled union-type roles (indeed, many arose due to the illegality of unions in pre-revolutionary Russia), historians estimate that in 7–10% of cases, factory committees were the result of workers' take-over of the factory. Most factory committees of this type developed as a means by workers to counter lock-outs and/or sabotage by factory owners. As a June conference of factory committees resolution describes,

From the beginning of the Revolution the administrative staffs of the factories have relinquished their posts. The workmen have practically become the masters. To keep the factories going, the workers' committees have had to take the management into their own hands. In the first days of the Revolution, in February and March, the workmen left the factories and went into the streets. The factories stopped work. About a fortnight later, the mass of workmen returned to their work. They found that many factories had been deserted. The managers, engineers, generals, mechanics, foremen had reason to believe that the workmen would wreak their vengeance on them, and they had disappeared. The workmen had to begin work with no administrative staff to guide them. They had to elect committees which gradually re-established a normal system of work. The committees had to find the necessary raw materials, and altogether to take upon themselves all kinds of unexpected and unaccustomed duties." (Resolution adopted during May 30 – June 5 Conference of Factory Committees in Petrograd, quoted in S.O. Zagorsky, State Control of Russian Industry During the War, p. 174.)

Through the factory committees workers dealt primarily with immediate economic questions, such as planning production and allocating compensation for work. At times, factory committees grew to rival the power, prestige, and effectiveness of the soviets and eventually sought political power. Nearing the October revolution, factory committees continued to grow in size and scope, attracting (and influencing) working class. In the ensuing Dispute about Trade Unions, the Bolsheviks managed to eliminate this threat to their monopoly on power.

Maurice Brinton of the Solidarity (UK) group wrote a history of the factory committees, their interactions with the unions and Bolsheviks in The Bolsheviks and Workers Control

== Soviet Union ==
In the Soviet Union, the terms "fabkom/zavkom" were abbreviations for "factory committee of the local organization of a Soviet trade union". Often the combined term "fabzavkoms" ("factory and plant committees") was used until these terms were replaced with the neutral term "profkom" for "profsoyusny komitet" (профком, профсоюзный комитет), which means "trade union committee". The term "profkom" has a convenience of being applicable to any type of establishment: factory, school, hospital, etc.
