= Lev Zadov =

Ukrainian counter-intelligence agent (1893–1938)

- לעוו זאדאוו
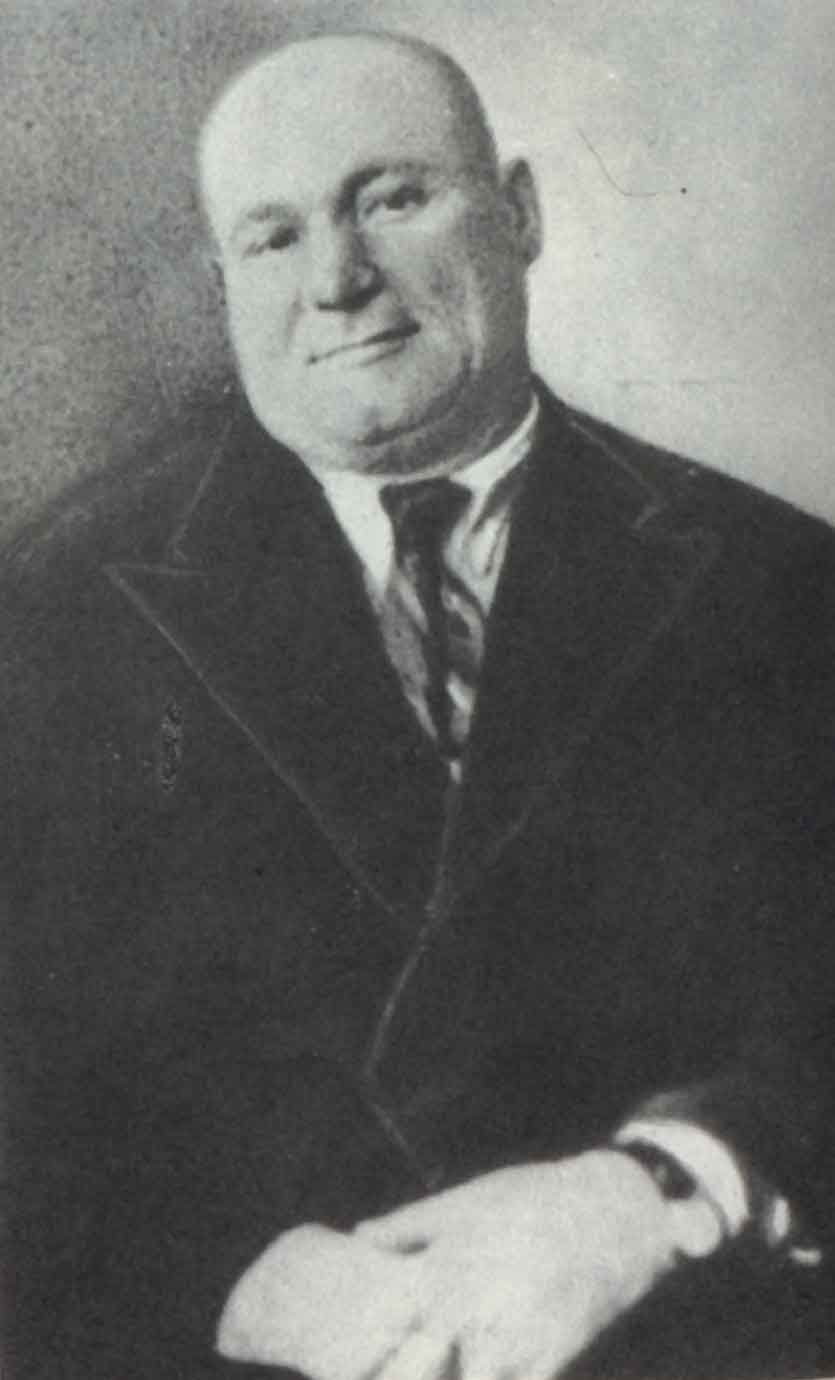

Otaman of the Kontrrazvedka
- In office March 1919 – August 1921

Personal details
- Born: Levko Mykolaiovych Zadov; 11 April 1893 Veselaya Yevreyka, Katerynoslav, Russian Empire
- Died: 25 September 1938 (aged 45) Kyiv, Ukrainian SSR, Soviet Union
- Cause of death: Execution by firing squad
- Resting place: Bykivnia, Darnytsia, Kyiv, Ukraine
- Citizenship: Russian Empire (1893-1917); Stateless (1918-1925); Soviet Union (1925-1938)
- Spouse: Vera Matvienko
- Children: Alla Zinkovskaya (b. 1921); Vadim Zinkovsky (b. 1926)
- Relatives: Danylo Zadov (brother)
- Occupation: Intelligence agent
- Known for: Military intelligence, espionage
- Nickname: Levko the Bandit

Military service
- Allegiance: Ukrainian Soviet Republic (1918); Makhnovshchina (1918-1921); Ukrainian Soviet Socialist Republic (1925-1937)
- Service: Red Guards (1918); Revolutionary Insurgent Army of Ukraine (1918-1921); Joint State Political Directorate (1925-1934); People's Commissariat for Internal Affairs (1934-1937)
- Years of service: 1918-1937
- Rank: Commandant
- Unit: 1st Donetsk Corps
- Battles/wars: Ukrainian War of Independence; Donbas-Don operation; Battle of Tsaritsyn; Battle for the Donbas; Battle of Peregonovka; Northern Taurida Operation; Siege of Perekop

Lev Mykolaiovych Zadov (Ukrainian: Лев Миколайович Задов; 1893–1938), also known by his nom de guerre Lev Zinkovskyi (Ukrainian: Лев Зіньковський), was chief of military intelligence of the Revolutionary Insurgent Army of Ukraine (RIAU) and later an operative of the Joint State Political Directorate (OGPU).

After joining the Ukrainian anarchist movement, Zadov was arrested and imprisoned for a series of robberies he committed in Donbas. He was released during the February Revolution and returned to Donbas, where he became involved in the local Soviet and joined the Red Guards, which he fought with until November 1918, when he joined Nestor Makhno's RIAU.

He became the de facto chief of the Kontrrazvedka, the Makhnovist military intelligence division, and carried out a campaign of terror against the Bolsheviks and the White movement. After the defeat of the Makhnovists, he retreated to Romania, before re-entering Ukraine in 1925 and joining the OGPU. He used his position to carry out subversive activities, for which he was arrested and executed during the Great Purge.

== Biography ==
=== Early life ===
Lev Mykolaiovych Zadov was born on 11 or 14 April 1893 in Veselaya, a small Jewish agricultural colony in the Oleksandrivskii district of the Katerynoslav province of the Russian Empire. In 1900, the Zadov family moved to Yuzivka, where the young Lev studied at a cheder before going to work in the city's factories.

=== Early revolutionary activity ===
During the 1905 Revolution, Zadov joined the Ukrainian anarchist movement and quickly became a committed activist. After Zadov went to work in the metallurgical factories of Yuzivka, in 1910, he joined a local anarcho-communist group and began to participate in a series of armed robberies, known as "expropriations". After robbing a post office in Karan and a bank in Debaltseve, in 1913, he was arrested for his activities as a "bezmotivnik" (English: Motiveless terrorist). He was sentenced to 8 years of penal labour, which he served between prisons in Bakhmut, Katerynoslav and Luhansk.

Zadov was released from prison during the February Revolution and adopted the revolutionary pseudonym of "Zinkovskyi". He then returned to Yuzivka, where he became a deputy of the local Soviet in September 1917. Following the invasion of Ukraine by the Central Powers, he became a member of the general staff for the Red Guards in Donbas. Zadov's detachment led a fighting retreat from Luhansk to Tsaritsyn, where they encountered Pyotr Krasnov's Don Army. During the course of the Battle of Tsaritsyn, Zadov rose through the ranks to become the chief of staff for Maksim Cherednyak's detachment.

In late 1918, the Southern Front ordered Zadov to return to Ukraine and foment an insurgency against the occupation forces. In Yuzivka, Zadov established an anarchist combat group, which immediately joined up with Nestor Makhno's partisans in Huliaipole and helped establish a number of other insurgent detachments throughout Donbas.

=== Chief of the Kontrrazvedka ===
In March 1919, following the integration of the insurgents into the 1st Zadneprovsk Ukrainian Soviet Division, Cherednyak was dispatched to the Katerynoslav region to carry out requisitioning. This requisitioning detachment formed the basis of the Kontrrazvedka, the counterintelligence service of the Makhnovshchina, of which Zadov became a founding member. In April 1919, Zadov established sections of the Kontrrazvedka in Mariupol and Berdiansk, which were concerned with securing provisions for the army from the civilian population, either through expropriations or levies. Zadov was soon joined by former members of the Union of Poor Peasants, including Hryhory Vasylivsky, who had experience in gathering intelligence. Following the break between the Makhnovists and the Bolsheviks, and the subsequent retreat to Uman, Zadov became the Kontrrazvedka's chief of staff for the 1st Donetsk Corps of the reorganised Revolutionary Insurgent Army of Ukraine. From this position, Zadov reportedly participated in the assassination of Nykyfor Hryhoriv, who had been charged with antisemitism and collaborationism.

As the de facto chief of the Kontrrazvedka, Zadov became infamous in Bolshevik accounts of the Makhnovist conduct in the war, which described him as a "butcher" and a "common criminal", and was even investigated by a commission of the Regional Congress, due to the excesses committed under his command. Upon the insurgents' arrival at Nikopol, Zadov arrested and almost executed the local commandant, but was only dissuaded from doing so by Makhno himself. When the 1st Donetsk Corps withdrew from Oleksandrivsk on 3–4 November 1919, Zadov's Kontrrazvedka was ordered by Makhno himself to remain behind in the city and to liquidate 80 members of the anti-Makhnovist opposition, including Mensheviks and Socialist Revolutionaries. Makhno then ordered Zadov to take 30 barrels of liquor and leave them in a nearby village, successfully distracting the pursuing forces of Andrei Shkuro, and to spread word of the Makhnovist offensive, causing peasant uprisings in the rear of the White movement. On 2 December, Zadov participated in the arrest and execution of four Bolsheviks in Oleksandrivsk, on charges of attempting to assassinate Nestor Makhno. A Soviet reported claimed that 1,000 Bolsheviks, industrial workers and state officials were killed during this period, many of them executed under Zadov's orders. This preceded a period of renewed conflict between the Makhnovists and the Bolsheviks, during which two members of the Cheka attempted to recruit Zadov over their side, but they were arrested and shot on 21 June 1920.

In the wake of the White offensive into Tavria, the insurgents began to prepare for sustained guerilla warfare in the White rear. But on 24 June, the vanguard of the insurgent cavalry was ambushed by the Red Army, wiping out three quarters of the 2,000-strong detachment and wounding Makhno himself. Zadov was held accountable for the losses, with Makhno blaming the Kontrrazvedka for not having gathered sufficient intelligence on the Red positions. Following this, Zadov joined Semen Karetnyk's detachment as a commandant and participated in the assault on Crimea, during which the Kontrrazvedka provided military intelligence for the offensive. After Pyotr Wrangel's Russian Army was vanquished, the Red Army immediately turned on the insurgents, eventually forcing the Makhnovshchina to disperse. During this period of repression, Zadov ensured the protection of Nestor Makhno at every turn. In August 1921, Zadov organised the retreat of the Makhnovist core into Romania. At the border, Zadov disguised himself and the other insurgents as members of the Red Army, accosted the border guards and disarmed them, before crossing the Dniester and leaving Ukraine behind.

=== Agent of the OGPU ===
In the Romanian capital of Bucharest, Zadov established a Makhnovist Foreign Centre, through which the insurgents aimed to prepare another anti-Bolshevik uprising in Ukraine. In 1924, Zadov was recruited by the Siguranța to infiltrate the Ukrainian Soviet state. He then crossed back over the Dniester and surrendered to the Joint State Political Directorate (OGPU), which granted him amnesty and recruited him into the Soviet intelligence service. From 1924 to 1925, he collaborated with the authorities in Kharkiv, participating in operations against emigrant organisations and Romanian intelligence. According to Jacob Gridin, a former Soviet intelligence agent, Zadov proved his fidelity to the OGPU by assassinating a French captain of the Deuxième Bureau and was even ordered by his superiors to assassinate Makhno himself.

He then moved to Tiraspol and began to carry out subversive activities in Romania, using many of his contacts in the exiled Makhnovist movement. Zadov worked with the Foreign Centre to organise safe passage for any Makhnovists who wished to return from exile and receive amnesty from the Ukrainian Soviet government. He increasingly networked with other amnestied Makhnovists and reportedly established a Makhnovist cell in Odesa, with plans to establish insurgent detachments in the wider region. But following Makhno's death in 1934, the network began to fall apart and an inquiry was initiated by the NKVD. In August 1937, the Odesa Makhnovists were exposed as part of the Great Purge, revealing 90 active dissidents within the organisation.

On 4 September 1937, Zadov was arrested on charges of establishing an insurgent Makhnovist cell, collaborating with foreign intelligence services, and smuggling. He denied any wrongdoing and refused to inform on other members of the organisation. On 25 September 1938, he was executed in Kyiv by the NKVD; his body was buried in Bykivnia. Zadov was formally rehabilitated by the Soviet government in 1990.

== Personal life ==
During his time in the Kontrrazvedka, in early 1919, Zadov met Feodora Gaenko, who became his lover and a collaborator in the Kontrrazvedka. Lev Zadov then married Vera Matvienko in 1925 and had a daughter, Alla Zinkovskaya (born 1921), and son, Vadim Zinkovskyi (born 1926). Alla Zinkovskaya volunteered to join Red Army in the beginning of the Soviet-German War. She was killed on 13 June 1942. Vadim Zinkovskyi also joined the Soviet navy and eventually became a rear-admiral. He lived to see his father's rehabilitation, during the dissolution of the Soviet Union, and apparently came to believe in his father's innocence.

== Bibliography ==
- Azarov, Vyacheslav (2008). Kontrrazvedka - The Story of the Makhnovist Intelligence Service. Translated by Archibald, Malcolm. Edmonton: Black Cat Press. ISBN 978-0-9737827-2-1. OCLC 233786926.
- Darch, Colin (2020). Nestor Makhno and Rural Anarchism in Ukraine, 1917-1921. London: Pluto Press. ISBN 9781786805263. OCLC 1225942343.
- Drozdov, V.V. (2010). "Задов Лев Миколайович" [Zadov Lev Mykolaiovych]. Encyclopedia of Modern Ukraine (in Ukrainian). Vol. 10. Kyiv: National Academy of Sciences of Ukraine. ISBN 978-966-02-5721-4. OCLC 50076331.
- Malet, Michael (1982). Nestor Makhno in the Russian Civil War. London: Palgrave Macmillan. ISBN 978-0-333-25969-6. OCLC 8514426.
- Skirda, Alexandre (2004) [1982]. Nestor Makhno–Anarchy's Cossack: The Struggle for Free Soviets in the Ukraine 1917–1921. Translated by Sharkey, Paul. Oakland: AK Press. ISBN 978-1-902593-68-5. OCLC 60602979.
