= Mykhailo Polonsky =

Ukrainian Red Army soldier (d.1919)

- Михайло Полонський
- Polonsky in 1919
- Born: Mykhailo Lavrentiyovych Polonsky; Berdiansk, Russian Empire
- Died: 5 December 1919; Katerynoslav, Ukraine
- Other names: M. L. Polonsky; Yevgeny Polonsky
- Spouse: Tatyana Polonsky
- Military career
- Allegiance: Russian Empire (1914-1917); Ukrainian PRS (1917-1918); Ukrainian SSR (1919)
- Service: Black Sea Fleet (1914-1917); Red Guards (1917-1918); Red Army (early 1919); Insurgent Army (late 1919)
- Service years: 1914-1919
- Rank: Regimental commander
- Unit: 58th Rifle Division
- Commands: Iron Regiment
- Known for: Polonsky conspiracy
- Conflicts: World War I Ukrainian War of Independence

Mykhailo Lavrentiyovych Polonsky (Ukrainian: Михайло Лаврентійович Полонський; Russian: Михаил Лаврентьевич Полонский, romanized: Mikhail Lavrentievich Polonsky) (Note: Also known as Yevgeny Polonsky (Ukrainian: Євген Полонський; Russian: Евгений Полонский).) was a Ukrainian soldier in the Red Army and the leader of a Bolshevik conspiracy to overthrow the Makhnovshchina.

== Biography ==
Mykhailo Lavrentiyovych Polonsky was born in Berdiansk, the son of a fisherman. During World War I, he was drafted into the Black Sea Fleet. Following the 1917 Revolution, he briefly joined the Left Socialist-Revolutionaries, before signing up with the Communist Party in early 1918.

After serving on the revolutionary committee of Huliaipole, he joined the Makhnovist movement and became a regimental commander following the battle of Dibrivka. In early 1919, he and his regiment were integrated into the Red Army, joining the 58th Rifle Division. But in August 1919, after the Red Army fled Ukraine, he joined up with the Revolutionary Insurgent Army, along with most of his division. Here, he came to command the 3rd Crimean Regiment, which eventually changed its name to the "Iron Regiment".

When the insurgents captured most of southern Ukraine, Polonsky became part of the Bolshevik underground, which aimed to subvert the influence of the anarchists. While on his way to attend the Fourth Regional Congress in Oleksandrivsk, Polonsky attended a communist meeting, in which he agreed to lead his unit in a coup d'etat against the insurgent high command. He helped to finance the plot and sent his adjutant to coordinate with the Bolshevik leadership in Moscow.

As part of the plan to install Bolsheviks in positions of command within the Insurgent Army, by 18 October, Polonsky had recruited a number of insurgent commanders into the conspiracy. Polonsky even rose to the rank of commander of the Nikopol Military District, but he was dismissed by November, due to his spreading of Bolshevik propaganda. He subsequently moved to the insurgent headquarters of Katerynoslav, where he claimed to be seeking medical treatment. Once in the city, he began plotting to poison Nestor Makhno and other members of the insurgent high command, even bribing doctors into poisoning insurgent commanders that were sick with typhus.

On 2 December 1919, Polonsky attended a meeting with the Central Committee of the Communist Party of Ukraine, in which the conspirators laid out their plans for Makhno's assassination. They planned to lure the high command from a conference to Polonsky's apartment, claiming it to be a party celebrating his wife's birthday. Polonsky's wife Tatyana was even to play a direct role in the assassination, using her skill as a professional actor to poison Makhno himself. But when the plan was carried out, Polonsky's apartment was stormed by the Kontrrazvedka, who arrested the couple, along with three other conspirators.

Polonsky and his co-conspirators were found guilty of conspiracy and sentenced to execution by firing squad. Makhno even accused Polonsky of treason, for having allegedly handed passwords to the units of Yakov Slashchov. On 5 December 1919, the five conspirators were led to the banks of the Dnieper, where they were shot by Semen Karetnyk, Aleksandr Lepechenko and Hryhory Vasylivsky.

== Bibliography ==
- Azarov, Vyacheslav (2008). Kontrrazvedka - The Story of the Makhnovist Intelligence Service. Translated by Archibald, Malcolm. Edmonton: Black Cat Press. ISBN 978-0-9737827-2-1. OCLC 233786926.
- Darch, Colin (2020). Nestor Makhno and Rural Anarchism in Ukraine, 1917-1921. London: Pluto Press. ISBN 9781786805263. OCLC 1225942343.
- Malet, Michael (1982). Nestor Makhno in the Russian Civil War. London: Palgrave Macmillan. ISBN 978-0-333-25969-6. OCLC 8514426.
- Rumyantsev, Vyacheslav (20 January 2000). "Полонский Евгений (М. Л.)". Hrono.ru (in Russian).
- Shubin, Aleksandr (2010). "The Makhnovist Movement and the National Question in the Ukraine, 1917–1921". In Hirsch, Steven J.; van der Walt, Lucien (eds.). Anarchism and Syndicalism in the Colonial and Postcolonial World, 1870–1940. Studies in Global Social History. Vol. 6. Leiden: Brill. pp. 147–191. ISBN 9789004188495. OCLC 868808983.
- Skirda, Alexandre (2004) [1982]. Nestor Makhno–Anarchy's Cossack: The Struggle for Free Soviets in the Ukraine 1917–1921. Translated by Sharkey, Paul. Oakland: AK Press. ISBN 978-1-902593-68-5. OCLC 60602979.
