= Hryhory Vasylivsky =

Ukrainian revolutionary (d. 1921)

- Григорій Василівський
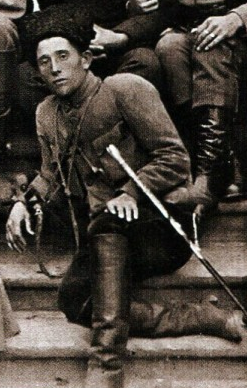
- Hryhory Vasylivsky (1919)
- Born: Huliaipole, Katerynoslav, Russian Empire
- Died: 2 January 1921; Katerynoslav, Ukrainian SSR
- Military career
- Allegiance: Makhnovshchina
- Service: Revolutionary Insurgent Army of Ukraine
- Service years: 1918–1921
- Unit: Kontrrazvedka
- Conflicts: Ukrainian War of Independence; Northern Taurida Operation

Hryhory Vasylivsky (Ukrainian: Григорій Василівський; d. 1921) was a commander in the Revolutionary Insurgent Army of Ukraine, often serving as Nestor Makhno's aide-de-camp and as the army's chief of staff.

== Biography ==
Hryhory Vasylivsky was born into a poor peasant family in Huliaipole. In the wake of the 1905 Revolution, he joined the Union of Poor Peasants and participated in its campaign of expropriations, during which he became experienced in intelligence gathering. As part of this group, he became a close friend of Nestor Makhno, later joining his insurgent movement during the Ukrainian War of Independence.

In April 1919, Makhno ordered him to reinforce the insurgent detachment in Mariupol, where he joined Lev Zadov's branch of the Kontrrazvedka, the newly established counterintelligence division of the insurgent movement. He quickly became one of the chiefs of the Kontrrazvedka's military division and carried out a series of terrorist attacks in the enemy rear. On 25 June 1919, he participated in a meeting with Nykyfor Hryhoriv, who was negotiating to merge his forces with those of Nestor Makhno. But an investigation by the Kontrrazvedka discovered evidence of Hryhoriv's participation in antisemitic pogroms and connections to the White movement, for which he was assassinated by the Kontrrazvedka.

In the autumn of 1919, Vasylivsky joined the insurgent staff, alongside Semen Karetnyk, Viktor Belash and Oleksiy Chubenko. Together with Karetnyk and Chubenko, he participated in the arrest and execution of the leaders of the Polonsky conspiracy, a Bolshevik attempt to assassinate the insurgent high command. This affair led to the dissolution of the Kontrrazvedka and its replacement with the Commission for Anti-Makhnovist Activities, which Vasylivsky joined, along with Halyna Kuzmenko and Nazarii Zuichenko.

After the insurgent capture of Huliaipole in October 1920, Vasylivsky remained behind in the city with a wounded Makhno, while Karetnyk led the insurgent army on to Crimea, in their offensive against the White movement. On 16 November 1920, when Vasylivsky heard that Semen Karetnyk's detachment had breached the White defenses at Perekop, he declared the end of the Starobilsk agreement and predicted that the Bolsheviks would attack them within the week. On 26 November, Huliaipole was attacked by the 42nd Division and 2nd Cavalry Corps of the Red Army, forcing the insurgents to flee.

On 2 January 1921, while the insurgents were being pursued by the 8th Division of the 1st Cavalry Army, Hryhory Vasylivsky was killed in battle.

== Bibliography ==
- Azarov, Vyacheslav (2008). Kontrrazvedka - The Story of the Makhnovist Intelligence Service. Translated by Archibald, Malcolm. Edmonton: Black Cat Press. ISBN 978-0-9737827-2-1. OCLC 233786926.
- Malet, Michael (1982). Nestor Makhno in the Russian Civil War. London: Palgrave Macmillan. ISBN 978-0-333-25969-6. OCLC 8514426.
- Skirda, Alexandre (2004) [1982]. Nestor Makhno–Anarchy's Cossack: The Struggle for Free Soviets in the Ukraine 1917–1921. Translated by Sharkey, Paul. Oakland: AK Press. ISBN 978-1-902593-68-5. OCLC 60602979.
