= Kontrrazvedka =

Counterintelligence division of the Revolutionary Insurgent Army of Ukraine

- Ukrainian: Контррозвідка; Kontrrozvidka

Agency overview
- Formed: 15 March 1919
- Dissolved: 9 July 1920 (Civilian section); 26 August 1921 (Military section)
- Type: Intelligence agency
- Jurisdiction: Southern and eastern Ukraine
- Headquarters: Oleksandrivsk
- Employees: 5,000
- Agency executive: Lev Zadov, Chief
- Parent department: Military Revolutionary Council

The Kontrrazvedka (Ukrainian: Контррозвідка, romanized: Kontrrozvidka) was the counterintelligence division of the Revolutionary Insurgent Army of Ukraine. Its main functions were to carry out military reconnaissance, the prosecution of captured enemies and counter-insurgency operations.

== Background ==
During the early 20th century, Ukrainian anarchists initiated a campaign of terrorism against the Russian Empire. Robberies, known as "expropriations", where frequently carried out against institutions of the state and capitalism. Unlike other criminal groups of the time, anarchist organisations spent the money from these expropriations on the publication of propaganda, without keeping any for themselves. The anarchist terrorist campaign culminated during the 1905 Revolution, during which 4,500 imperial officials were either killed or wounded. Tens of thousands of terrorist attacks, including expropriations, were also carried out in the years following the suppression of the revolution.

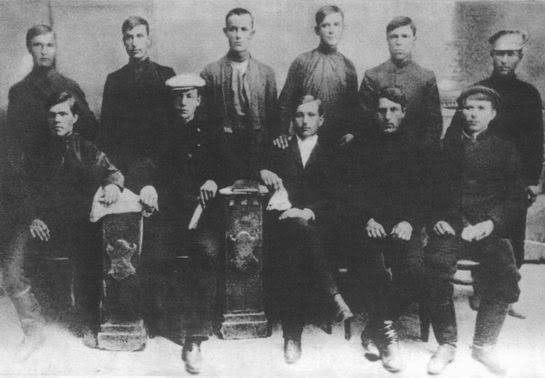
Members of the Union of Poor Peasants.

This series of expropriations resulted in the development of an ad hoc intelligence apparatus by the militant anarchist organisations, which aided in the planning of raids and attacks through thorough research and reconnaissance. The Union of Poor Peasants, which carried out expropriations in Katerynoslav province, developed its own intelligence gathering operation during its targeted assassination of a police officer by Oleksandr Semenyuta. This meant that, by the outbreak of the 1917 Revolution, there were many anarchist insurgents that had prior experience in counterintelligence. One of these anarchists was Lev Zadov, who had been imprisoned for his criminal activities by the imperial authorities and released during the February Revolution, after which he returned home to Yuzivka and participated in the activities of the local Soviet. Following the outbreak of Civil War, Zadov then went on to fight in Maksim Cherednyak's detachment of Red Guards against the counterrevolution of the White movement, before linking up with the Makhnovshchina during their war of independence against the Central Powers. The local insurgents, led by Nestor Makhno, had already developed their own reconnaissance unit by the time of the battle of Dibrivka. The unit consisted largely of former border guards, whose reconnaissance of the enemy positions ensured the insurgent victory over the occupation forces.

== First formation ==
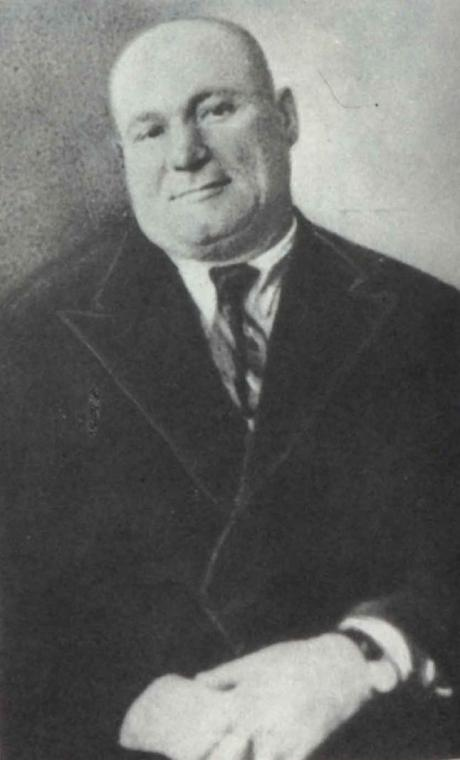
Lev Zadov, founding member and chief of the Kontrrazvedka.

In February 1919, the insurgents entered into an alliance with the Red Army, integrating themselves into Pavel Dybenko's 1st Zadneprovsk Ukrainian Soviet Division, in return for armaments. Following the capture of Berdiansk by the insurgent 3rd Brigade on 15 March, Maksim Cherednyak was appointed to form a counterintelligence division, which would procure provisions for the insurgents and hunt down collaborators of the White movement in the city. Cherednyak, who had previously organised a counterintelligence detachment for the Southern Front of the Red Army, established the Kontrrazvedka, which was immediately tasked with carrying out requisitioning in order to supply provisions to the insurgent brigade.

Cherednyak also established a civilian counterintelligence section in Mariupol, and again tasked them with procuring provisions for the insurgents, either through expropriation or levies. This had become more necessary as the Red Army command had cut supplies to the Ukrainian insurgents, who increasingly recruited intelligence agents with backgrounds in both expropriation and terrorism. Cherednyak's own associates, including Lev Zadov, were the first members of this new Kontrrazvedka. Among the new recruits were former members of the Union of Poor Peasants, including Oleksandr Lepechenko, Isidor Lyuty and Hryhory Vasylivsky, as well as veteran intelligence specialists, such as Yakov Glazgon, K. Kovalevich and P. Sobolev.

Within weeks, the Berdiansk Kontrrazvedka came into conflict with the local division of the Cheka, after uncovering evidence that local Bolsheviks had planned to assassinate Nestor Makhno. In response to this, combined with the political repression being carried out by the Cheka in southern Ukraine, Makhno ordered Cherednyak's Kontrrazvedka to break up the Berdiansk Cheka division. Conflict between the Makhnovists and their Bolshevik commanders culminated with Makhno's resignation from the Red Army. Under the weight of political repression, the Kontrrazvedka dissolved, with many of the organisation's agents joining Makhno's detachment in retreating into the west.

== Second formation ==
=== In Ukraine ===
Makhno himself reorganised the Kontrrazvedka around the 500 cavalry that formed his personal security service, the "Black Sotnia", a unit that became infamous due to its punitive actions. In July 1919, during the meeting of the Makhnovists with Nykyfor Hryhoriv, the Kontrrazvedka investigated the ataman's actions in Kherson. They found Hrhyoriv guilty of committing pogroms and collaborating with the White movement, for which he was executed. In August 1919, when the Makhnovists reached Novyi Buh, the Kontrrazvedka engineered a coup within the Red Army's 58th Rifle Division, which included a number of former insurgent commanders that remained sympathetic to the Makhnovshchina, resulting in much of the unit defecting to the Makhnovists. On 1 September 1919, the Revolutionary Insurgent Army of Ukraine (RIAU) was reorganised at an insurgent conference in Dobrovelychkivka, resulting in the re-election of the entire formation, including the Military Revolutionary Council (VRS) and the Kontrrazvedka. Over the subsequent weeks, the Military Kontrrazvedka led a series of raids against White trains and carried out bank robbies behind the White rear in Pryazovia, in order to fund the insurgent army.

On 19 September, the Makhnovshchina concluded an agreement with the Ukrainian People's Republic, which allowed a brief period of respite for the two forces. At this time, the Kontrrazvedka began infiltrating the Ukrainian People's Army (UPA) and reported that the nationalists had begun negotiations with the White movement at Khrystynivka. They also reported on an apparent nationalist attempt to remove Makhno and merge the two armies, which allegedly included Fedir Shchus and Halyna Kuzmenko. These developments culminated with the Kontrrazvedka plotting the assassination of the nationalist leader Symon Petliura, which they planned to carry out at an arranged meeting with him in Uman. But Petliura managed to avoid his would-be assassins, who were surrounded and killed after a two-hour battle with the UPA, forcing both sides to withdraw. Some Ukrainian nationalists responded by defecting to the Makhnovists, who were integrated into the Free Cossack Insurgent Group following their investigation by the Kontrrazvedka, which continued surveilling their commanders and even executed some for having committing pogroms after joining.

=== In Russia ===
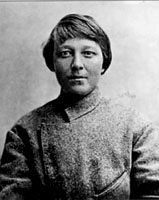
Maria Nikiforova, who led agents of the Kontrrazvedka in a series of assassination attempts against leaders of the White movement and the Bolsheviks.

Meanwhile, other agents of the first Kontrrazvedka had signed up to Maria Nikiforova's terrorist detachment, which organised assassination attempts against leaders of the White movement, such as Anton Denikin and Alexander Kolchak. Cherednyak's group made it to Siberia, where he led an insurgent movement against the Russian State. Kovalevich led his own group to Moscow, where he collaborated with Left Socialist-Revolutionaries in an attempt to assassinate leading figures of the Russian Communist Party, while Sobolev even attempted to blow up the Kremlin. By October 1919, these attempts were all uncovered by the Cheka, which ambushed and killed the former kontrrazvedniks in a series of raids. In his memoirs, Makhnovist chief of staff Viktor Bilash claimed that the activities of the Moscow group happened under direction of the Kontrrazvedka, while leaflets issued by the Moscow group itself declared their planned attacks to be revenge for the execution of Makhnovists by the Cheka. Testimony by one of the captured anarchists even established a direct link between the actions of the Moscow group and those of the Makhnovists in Ukraine.

== Third formation ==
The Military Section of the Kontrrazevkda had continued working behind the frontlines in the White rear, where they reported a military vacuum, with no White units to be found in multiple directions. Following the insurgent victory over the Volunteer Army at the battle of Peregonovka, the insurgent staff immediately resolved to return to left-bank Ukraine, where they planned to build a regime of free soviets, as laid out in their Draft Declaration by the Fourth Regional Congress in Oleksandrivsk. The Makhnovists declared a system of justice be created through self-organisation, which led once again to the rise of the Kontrrazvedka. The Kontrrazvedka played a particularly important role in the insurgent capture of Berdiansk, where they recruited local fisherman to attack the White garrison and let the insurgents into the city.

By the time that the Makhnovshchina was in control of most of southern and eastern Ukraine, the Kontrrazvedka itself had intelligence centres in every single major settlement, often situated in places that soldiers frequented, like taverns and cafes. This network kept tabs on White movements and kept the insurgent command updated on conditions in the rear. The Kontrrazvedka also had agents infiltrating the Red and White armies, a dangerous enough job that it was often assigned to delinquent insurgents as punishment.

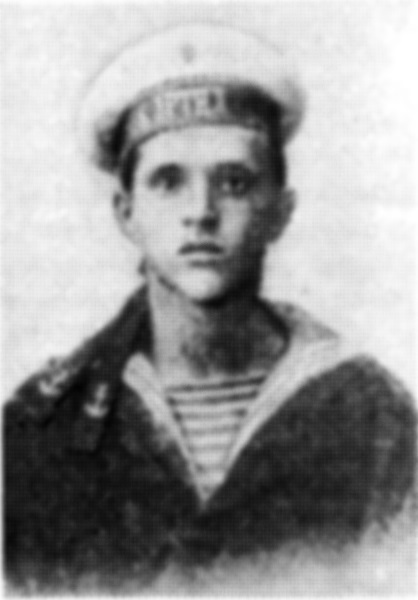
Dmitry Popov, the chief of the Kontrrazvedka during its operations in Katerynoslav.

The Civilian branch of the Kontrrazvedka was given largely unchecked power within the Makhnovist territory, which resulted in widespread use of cordon and search tactics and arrests of subversive persons. At this time, the Kontrrazvedka was led by Dmitry Popov, under whom the organisation developed a reputation for torture and arbitrary executions, fed by both Red and White reports. Reports from Katerynoslav depicted numerous executions on the banks of the Dnieper, where the Kontrrazvedka would leave the bodies to wash ashore. Among the executed were participants in the Polonsky conspiracy, an attempt by Bolsheviks to assassinate leading insurgents and overthrow the Makhnovshchina, which the Kontrrazvedka uncovered and suppressed. When the Whites later entered Katerynoslav, they found 70 bodies of those executed by the Kontrrazvedka.

With the Volunteer Army having already systematically looted the area, the insurgents carried out requisitions on a more orderly basis, targeting the procurement of provisions necessary for the survival of the army and the wider population. This was carried out largely in the major cities, while the Kontrrazvedka rarely touched rural villages. The Kontrrazvedka looted the homes of executed White officers, under the pretext of looking for weapons, in a series of arbitrary actions that were unauthorised by the insurgent staff. In all the major cities of southern Ukraine, the Kontrrazvedka carried out the expropriation of former White property from local banks and imposed levies on both landlords and the bourgeoisie. Finally, the Kontrrazvedka requisitioned winter clothing for the insurgents, for which they became known as "shubniks" (Russian: шубникы, due to the fur coats they wore. Although much of the looting was carried out in order to support the Insurgent Army, the Kontrrazvedka also redistributed the expropriated wealth to the urban poor, with thousands regularly queuing up outside their headquarters for portions and money also being transferred to city orphanages.

Although the VRS had managed to maintain discipline over the military, notably having a number of insurgents shot for looting, they were unable to extend that to the Kontrrazvedka, which went entirely unpunished for any act of looting. On 2 November 1919, the Oleksandrivsk Regional Congress established a commission to investigate the Kontrrazvedka and to resolve any grievances caused to the population. But while attempts at bringing the Kontrrazvedka under civilian control were largely unsuccessful, it was the military itself that managed to maintain order. When the 1st Donetsk Corps withdrew from Oleksandrivsk on 3 November, Makhno ordered its counterintelligence division to remain behind and liquidate 80 of the city's Mensheviks and Socialist Revolutionaries. But these unilateral death sentences were prevented by Alexander Kalashnikov and Semen Karetnyk, the commanders of the 1st Corps, who requested confirmation from Viktor Bilash and had the Kontrrazvedka screen the arrested at a meeting. Bilash subsequently blocked the order as "motiveless terror", which he claimed would only serve to exacerbate the coming White Terror, and ordered the arrested be released. The following week, after the insurgents retook Katerynoslav, Makhno ordered the Kontrrazvedka to shut down the Bolshevik newspaper Zvesda and shoot its editorial staff for having printed anti-Makhnovist articles, but these orders were also rejected by his subordinates, who declared that freedom of the press would be upheld.

By this time, an outbreak of epidemic typhus had spread through the ranks of the Insurgent Army. In response, the Military Kontrrazevdka covertly purchased medicine in areas still held by the Whites, such as Crimea, Odesa and Kharkiv.

== Fourth formation ==
At the beginning of 1920, the combined assault of the Whites and Reds, along with the spread of epidemic typhus, brought an end to definitive Makhnovist control over southern Ukraine. When the Red Army returned to Ukraine, it brought with it the Red Terror. On 19 January 1920, many Makhnovists that were sick with typhus, including the kontrrazvednik Oleksandr Lepechenko, were shot in their beds by the Red Army's 42nd Division. In Nikopol, the Kontrrazvedka of the 2nd Azov Corps was broken up and its commanders shot, although its chief Lev Golik managed to escape. Throughout the spring of 1920, Golik and his staff continued to operate underground, maintaining contacts between the disparate insurgent groups, in spite of the Insurgent Army itself being effectively dissolved. The Kontrrazvedka kept track of Red Army movements, allowing the insurgents to stay clear of open conflict. The Kontrrazvedka also identified targets for insurgent attacks, resulting in the seizure of two million rubles from Red transports in Huliaipole and the capture of ten machine guns from the 42nd Division in Polohy. It was the actions of the Kontrrazvedka during this time that set the foundation for the reformation of the Insurgent Army.

In May 1920, Felix Dzerzhinsky was tasked with liquidating the anarchist presence in Ukraine. The Cheka subsequently recruited a number of criminals, offering their death sentences be commuted, to infiltrate the ranks of the Makhnovists and kill any anti-Bolsheviks that they found. On 20 June 1920, two of these Red spies, Glushchenko and Kostyukhin, were arrested by the Kontrrazvedka in Turkenivka, after one confessed that they planned to assassinate Nestor Makhno. The pair were shot the following day. By this time, the Army of Wrangel had occupied Northern Taurida and the Makhnovists resolved to move their partisan activities behind the White lines. But when their advanced guard made for the front lines on 24 June, they were ambushed and almost wiped out by the 520th, 521st and 522nd Red infantry regiments. The lack of prior warning from the Kontrrazvedka infuriated the wounded Makhno, who even threatened to shoot Lev Zadov himself for their failure.

=== Abolition and replacement ===
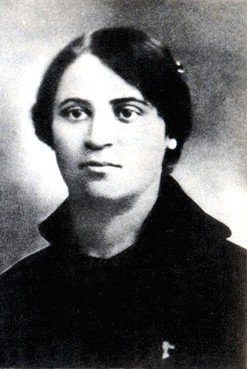
Halyna Kuzmenko, one of the founding members of the Commission for Anti-Makhnovist Activities.

On 9 July 1920, at a meeting in Vremivka, the newly constituted Revolutionary Insurgent Council (RPS) effectively abolished the Kontrrazvedka and unanimously voted to transfer its judicial and punitive functions to a new Commission for Anti-Makhnovist Activities (Ukrainian: Комісія Противмахноських Дел, romanized: Komisiya Protyvmakhnosʹkykh Del, KAD). During the meeting, the conduct of the Kontrrazvedka was criticised by Viktor Bilash, who personally pushed for the establishment of the KAD in its place, along with Yakiv Sukhovolski and Aron Baron. Nazarii Zuichenko was elected as chairman of the KAD, which also counted Halyna Kuzmenko and Hryhory Vasylivsky among its other members. The new Commission was given a mandate to prosecute prisoners of war from the White, Red and Ukrainian nationalist sides, as well as soldiers within the Insurgent Army. It was also allowed to charge agents of the Cheka, requisitioning units and anti-Makhnovist partisans, without investigation.

Even in the face of the White advance, the conflict between the Bolsheviks and Makhnovists intensified, with the Cheka prosecuting their Red Terror against any peasants suspected of Makhnovist sympathies. On 13 July, the Soviet Security Forces executed 2,000 Makhnovist prisoners in Chaplyne. This provoked reprisals from the Makhnovists, who on 15 July, raided Hryshyne and wiped out the local Bolsheviks. A subsequent raid cut through the provinces of Katerynoslav, Kharkiv and Poltava, during which the KAD carried out a "purge" of state officials in the areas that they occupied. Under orders from Kuzmenko, Makhno and Zadov, an estimated 1,000 Bolshevik officials were executed during the Bolshevik-Makhnovist conflict. The KAD also disarmed a unit of the Ukrainian People's Army and executed its commander for having committed pogroms. In September 1920, the KAD executed a requisitioning unit, although at Makhno's own intervention, it left the youngest member alive. The KAD also executed all officers of the White movement that it captured, while allowing their rank-and-file to join the ranks of the Insurgent Army.

The Makhnovist Kontrrazvedniks also directed the occupation of specific cities in order to replenish the Insurgent Army's supplies. On 3 September 1920, the Insurgents occupied Starobilsk and seized 22 million rubles from the local bank, which was paid out in wages to their fighters. They also targeted sugar refineries for seizure, as sugar pods were being increasingly used as a de facto currency, due to the scarcity of the commodity in rural villages.

=== Anti-Wrangel activities ===
Following the ratification of the Starobilsk agreement in September 1920, the insurgent staff ordered that all its units cease hostilities with the Red Army. Some local detachments refused this order and deserted, in order to continue fighting against the Bolsheviks, to which the KAD responded by ordering the execution of their commanders. During the Northern Taurida Operation, the KAD ordered the execution of unrepentant former Makhnovists that had joined the ranks of the White movement. The Military Kontrrazvedka also operated behind the White lines, ordering the "White Makhnovists" (insurgents that had defected to the Whites) to cease hostilities against the Red Army and prepare for the Makhnovist advance into White territory.

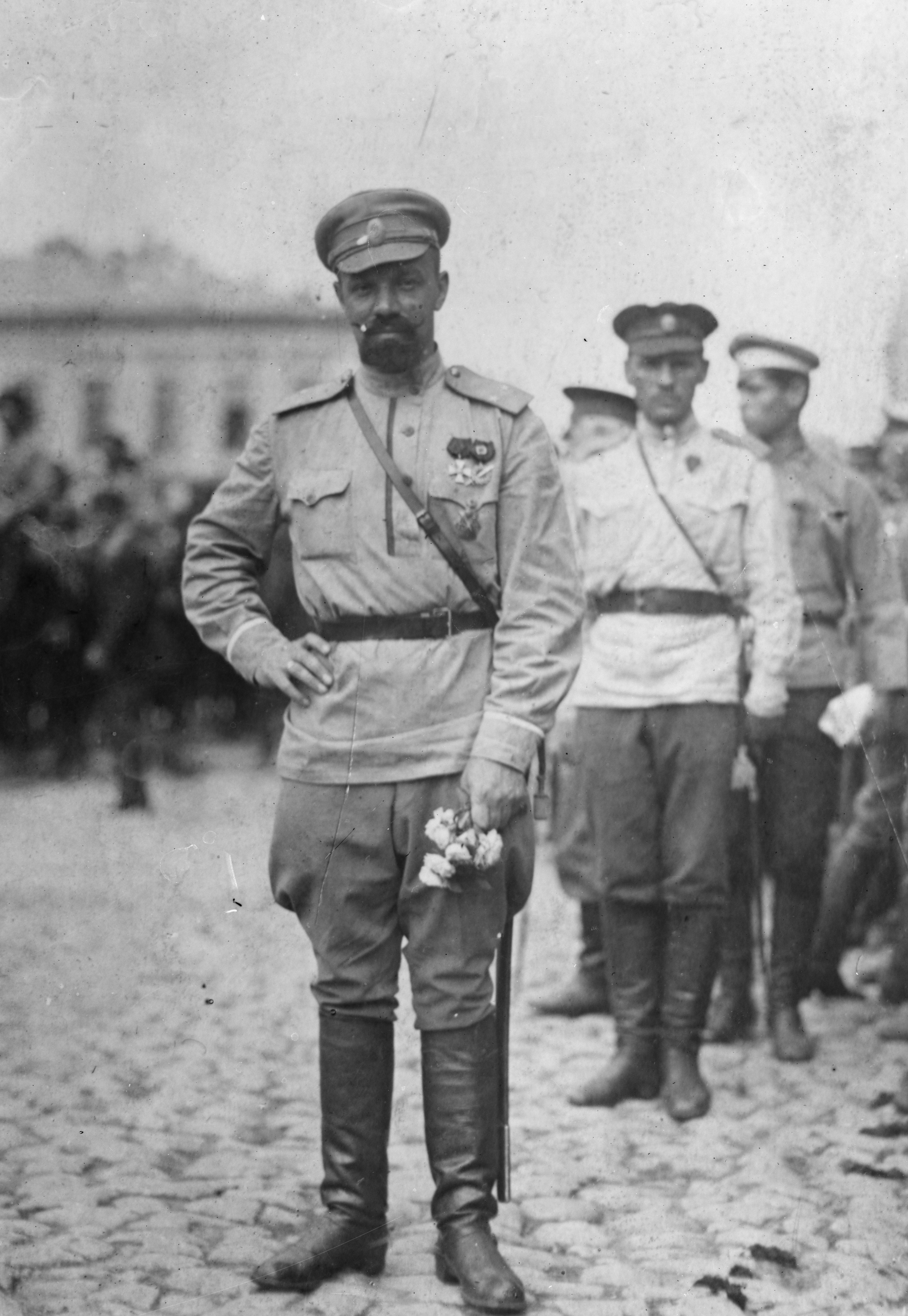
Alexander Kutepov, the White commander whose operations were sabotaged from the rear by "White Makhnovist" units, under the direction of the Kontrrazvedka.

As a result, the White attempts to cut off the Kakhovka bridgehead were sabotaged by the actions of the White Makhnovist cavalry division, which withdrew from the front and harassed the White rear between Nikopol and Oleksandrivsk. Despite their efforts against Alexander Kutepov's 1st Army Corps, on 25 October, the White Makhnovist division was defeated and disarmed at Melitopol, where their commander Volodin was shot. Other White Makhnovist units, such as the 10th Brigade, provided intelligence on White positions, allowing the Insurgent Army to break through the frontlines. With this information, the insurgents led by Petro Petrenko penetrated the rear of the Don Army, cutting them off from Wrangel and forcing them into retreat. The insurgent breaking of the White lines also allowed many of the White Makhnovists to reunite with the Insurgent Army, reinforcing it with an entire brigade of 3,300 infantry and 200 cavalry.

As the combined Soviet forces advanced towards Crimea, the Insurgent detachment led by Semen Karetnyk was joined by the Kontrrazvedka chiefs: Lev Zadov and Lev Golik. During the Perekop-Chonhar operation, the Kontrrazvedka carried out reconnaissance work with information from their agents in Crimea, which aided in the forcing of the Syvash and the capture of Crimea by the Soviets. The KAD itself increasingly upheld the terms of the Starobilsk agreement and ordered the execution of insurgent commanders that recruited Red Army deserters, in order to not provide pretext for the Bolsheviks to break it. Meanwhile, agents of the 42nd Division had been sent to Huliaipole, with orders to assassinate the insurgent leadership. But having already been infiltrated by the Military Kontrrazvekda, on 23 November 1920, the Cheka agents were arrested and executed by the KAD, which began to prepare for a larger-scale Bolshevik attack.

=== Guerrilla network ===
On 26 November 1920, the Red Army attacked the Makhnovshchina, inundating the Makhnovist-held territory with 58,000 Red soldiers and forcing the Insurgent Army to scatter their forces. Even after the attack, the KAD continued to take caution with punishing captured Soviet state officials, often releasing the ones that were compelled into their position. They also continued to hold their own insurgents to account, with one detachment fleeing the region upon hearing that the KAD was investigating their looting. Meanwhile, the Cheka carried out a punitive campaign against suspected Makhnovist sympathisers in Ukraine, specifically aiming to destroy their peasant-based intelligence network, which constantly provided the insurgents with information about Bolshevik positions and numbers.

The insurgent army broke itself up into smaller independent detachments, which maintained communication with each other through their intelligence network. During this period, the insurgent counterintelligence acted as a reconnaissance unit, gathering intelligence from peasants and securing provisions for the army, in order to ensure it kept moving. The Kontrrazvedka kept itself up-to-date not only on Red Army positions and numbers, but also their morale and the competency of their commanders. Makhnovist counterintelligence agents infiltrated many of the Bolshevik units, some of which even prepared to defect to the Makhnovist banner, resulting in a purge of officers with Makhnovist sympathies. On 3 December 1920, Kontrrazvedka spies led the rapid destruction of the Red Kirghiz Brigade at Komar. By March 1921, agents were also making use of disinformation to mislead the Red Army about insurgent movements.

In August 1921, when the defeat of the Makhnovshchina had been assured, Lev Zadov led the retreat of the Makhnovist core into Romania by disguising themselves in Red Army uniform and disarming the border guards, before crossing the Dniester.

== Aftermath ==
Despite the predominance of the Kontrrazvedka, the insurgent army's agent network was largely based on a grass-roots system of covert Makhnovist organisations, partisan units and supply points. Following the defeat of the Makhnovshchina, this network continued to function underground, forming the basis for the Makhnovist insurgency to continue until the rise of Joseph Stalin in the mid-1920s. Makhnovist cells continued to operate in Huliaipole, Dnipro, Odesa and Mariupol up until the Great Purge of 1938. One of these cells was established by Lev Zadov himself, who after returning to Ukraine and becoming an operative for the OGPU, used his network to ensure the safe passage of exiled Makhnovists to Odesa, where 90 of them were exposed during the Purge.

== Organisation ==
The Kontrrazvedka was subordinated to the Operations Section of the insurgent staff, which itself was under the supervision of the Military Revolutionary Council (VRS), and established its own subdivisions in insurgent-occupied cities, where they procured provisions and hunted down members of the White movement.

The organisation began as a centralised entity, as it was under the purview of a relatively small insurgent formation. But as the reach of the Makhnovshchina grew during the autumn of 1919, the organisation itself decentralised into a network structure, with its responsibilities spreading out between the four corps of the Revolutionary Insurgent Army. Each insurgent unit had its own Kontrrazvedka, each independently subordinated to the army headquarters, which created a dense intelligence network, where one-tenth of all insurgents acted as agents of the Kontrrazvedka. The Kontrrazvedka of the 1st Donetsk Corps was headed by Lev Zadov and that of the 2nd Azov Corps was headed by Lev Golik.

The Kontrrazvedka had both a Military and a Civilian Section. The Civilian Section, which included the counterintelligence divisions of the 1st and 2nd Corps, as well as Makhno's "Black Sotnia", was tasked with hunting down and liquidating enemy agents in the Makhnovist territory. Along with its own military agents, volunteers from the civilian population acted as informants for the Kontrrazvedka, which allowed for the swift identification and neutralisation of anti-Makhnovist agitators.

The Military Section was chiefly concerned with military intelligence, particularly reconnaissance. Behind the front lines, the Military Section was largely concerned with hunting down members and collaborators of the White movement, particularly those connected with the White law enforcement apparatus, who were executed by shooting. It also maintained a communications network between isolated insurgent units, kept contacts with the Nabat and distributed Makhnovist propaganda behind enemy lines.

Each of the sentences passed during the Kontrrazvedka's campaign of "Black Terror" were reviewed on a case-by-case basis, either by members of the Nabat, the Huliaipole Anarchist Union or the Military Revolutionary Soviet. The VRS itself was charged with maintaining discipline within the insurgent ranks, giving commanders authorisation to punish minor infractions, while establishing military tribunals to sentence those charged with more serious offenses.

== Bibliography ==
- Azarov, Vyacheslav (2008). Kontrrazvedka - The Story of the Makhnovist Intelligence Service. Translated by Archibald, Malcolm. Edmonton: Black Cat Press. ISBN 978-0-9737827-2-1. OCLC 233786926.
- Darch, Colin (2020). Nestor Makhno and Rural Anarchism in Ukraine, 1917-1921. London: Pluto Press. ISBN 9781786805263. OCLC 1225942343.
- Malet, Michael (1982). Nestor Makhno in the Russian Civil War. London: Palgrave Macmillan. ISBN 978-0-333-25969-6. OCLC 8514426.
- Patterson, Sean (2020). Makhno and Memory: Anarchist and Mennonite Narratives of Ukraine's Civil War, 1917–1921. Manitoba: University of Manitoba Press. ISBN 978-0-88755-578-7. OCLC 1134608930.
- Peters, Victor (1970). Nestor Makhno: The Life of an Anarchist. Winnipeg: Echo Books. OCLC 7925080.
- Skirda, Alexandre (2004) [1982]. Nestor Makhno–Anarchy's Cossack: The Struggle for Free Soviets in the Ukraine 1917–1921. Translated by Sharkey, Paul. Oakland: AK Press. ISBN 978-1-902593-68-5. OCLC 60602979.
