= Polonsky conspiracy =

Plot to assassinate Nestor Makhno and other insurgent leaders

- Part of the Bolshevik–Makhnovist conflict
- Type: Conspiracy
- Location: Katerynoslav, Ukraine
- Planned: October–November 1919
- Planned by: Communist Party of Ukraine
- Commanded by: Mykhailo Polonsky (executed)
- Objective: Overthrow of the Makhnovshchina (targeting Nestor Makhno and other insurgent commanders)
- Date: 2–3 or 4–5 December 1919
- Executed by: Pro-Bolshevik units within the Revolutionary Insurgent Army of Ukraine
- Outcome: Failure
- Casualties: 5 conspirators executed

The Polonsky conspiracy, also known as the Polonsky plot or Polonsky affair, was an attempt by Ukrainian Bolsheviks to overthrow the Makhnovshchina during the autumn of 1919.

After the Makhnovists had captured most of southern Ukraine from the White movement, they prohibited activities that intended to establish an authoritarian regime in Ukraine, which forced Bolshevik cells to go underground. The revolutionary committees of Oleksandrivsk and Katerynoslav began planning to assassinate Nestor Makhno and other members of the insurgent high command, after which pro-Bolshevik units of the insurgent army would seize power in the region. However, the plot was uncovered and suppressed by the Kontrrazvedka, the Makhnovist counterintelligence division. Mykhailo Polonsky and other members of the conspiracy were arrested and summarily executed by firing squad.

The planned coup and its suppression further worsened relations between the Makhnovists and Bolsheviks, the latter of which had wanted a public trial for the conspirators. The split culminated in an all-out conflict between the two sides in January 1920, when the Red Army moved back into Ukraine.

== Background ==
During the early months of the Ukrainian War of Independence, when Ukrainian anarchists found themselves fighting against the nascent White movement, they resolved to integrate themselves into the ranks of the Red Army, which was led by the Russian Bolshevik Party. This arrangement did not last long, as political differences between the anarchists and the Bolsheviks culminated in a split. The anarchists led by Nestor Makhno (and known as Makhnovists), resigned command in the Red Army and retreated into the west. Meanwhile, the Red Army withdrew from Ukraine, causing a number of defections to the ranks of the Makhnovists' newly-established Revolutionary Insurgent Army of Ukraine. In August 1919, members of the Red Army's 58th Rifle Division, including one Mykhailo Polonsky, defected to the Insurgent Army at Pomichna.

Following the Insurgent Army's defeat of the Volunteer Army at the Battle of Peregonovka, the Makhnovshchina expanded its reach throughout southern Ukraine. In the occupied territory, the Insurgent Army proclaimed freedom of speech, freedom of the press, freedom of assembly and freedom of association for all factions of left-wing politics. For the press, the only restriction they imposed was a requirement that all reports of military activity follow the line of the Makhnovist newspaper The Road to Freedom. However, when it came to organisations, the Makhnovists prohibited any "preparation or organisation of enforcement on the masses of any regime affecting their complete freedom"; this forced the Bolsheviks to move their activities underground and restructure themselves into a clandestine cell system. In the city of Katerynoslav, the offices of the Bolshevik newspaper Zvezda became the centre of their clandestine operations, which aimed to win support from politically neutral industrial workers and cause a split in the Makhnovist movement by pitting poor peasants against wealthier kulaks. By the time the White movement had been decisively defeated in Ukraine, the Bolsheviks had emerged as the Makhnovshchina's principal rival.

== Plot ==
While preparations were being made for the Fourth Regional Congress in Oleksandrivsk, the local revolutionary committee met to discuss plans for a coup d'état. They began plotting against Makhno after he had threatened to shoot socialists and the Oleksandrivsk Revkom in the event they created organs of power. The plot was headed by the pro-Bolshevik insurgent commander Mykhailo Polonsky, who led the Insurgent Army's 3rd Crimean Regiment (later known as the Iron Regiment) and was a delegate to the upcoming Congress.

Financed in part by a loan from the bourgeoisie of Oleksandrivsk, the committee planned to mobilize armed workers' detachments and have them join up with the Iron Regiment at its headquarters in Nikopol, seize the city and make it their centre of operations. The committee recruited mutinous insurgents from former units of the Red Army. They packed command posts of the Insurgent Army with members of the Communist Party of Ukraine (CPU). They even successfully elected one of their own members (P. Novitsky) to the Military Revolutionary Council (VRS) at the Oleksandrivsk Congress. Polonsky also managed to get himself appointed as commander of the Nikopol Military District, but was removed from his post towards the end of October 1919, on charges of spreading Bolshevik propaganda. Nevertheless, the Bolsheviks' subversive activity eventually resulted in CPU cells being established in almost every insurgent unit, with the exception of those commanded by Foma Kozhyn and Fedir Shchus. According to historian Michael Malet, the 3rd and 33rd Divisions were "decisively pro-communist". The CPU justified the existence of their cells to the Kontrrazvedka by claiming that it was part of an attempt to reconcile the Insurgent Army with the Red Army, and to prevent conflict from breaking out between the two factions.

By the end of November, the army had been beset by epidemic typhus, which eventually killed 35,000 insurgents. In Nikopol, the centre of both the plot and the epidemic, the activities of the 2nd Azov Corps were limited by low morale, which provided the mutiny with more support. When the Insurgent Army quit Oleksandrivsk, the conspirators followed the Makhnovist leadership to Katerynoslav, where the CPU established another underground committee and began carrying out anti-Makhnovist agitation, in an attempt to demoralise the local insurgent garrison. The garrison's commander, Lashkevich, confronted the local Bolsheviks and threatened to arrest them, demanding the dissolution of the cells in his own 13th Regiment. But this was blocked by the VRS, which resolved to uphold freedom of association for the Bolsheviks.

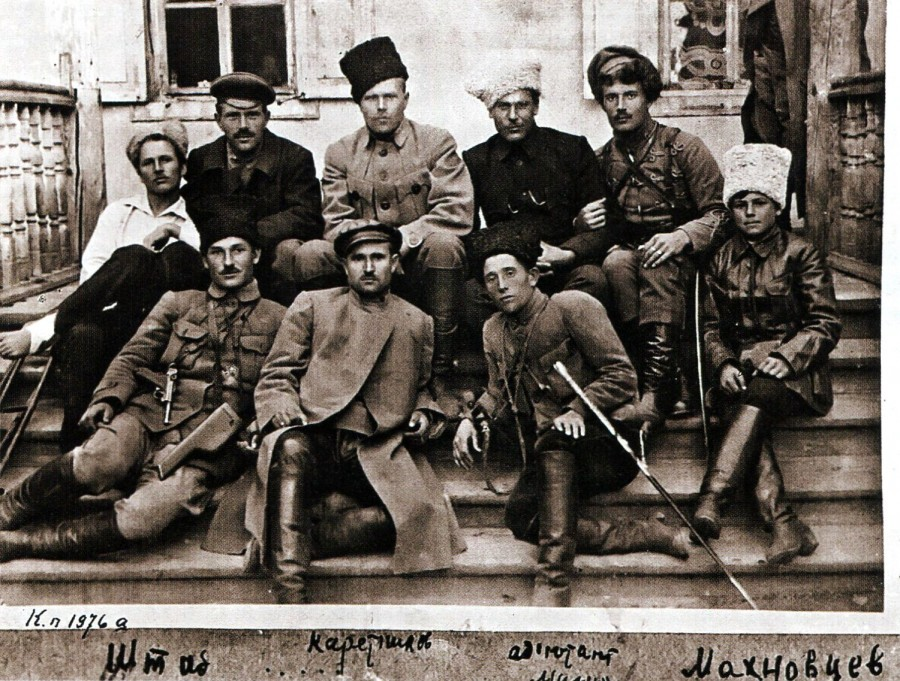
Members of the insurgent staff, including Semen Karetnyk (front row, second from left) and Hryhory Vasylivsky (front row, third from left), who participated in the suppression of the conspiracy

As the plot took shape, the Iron Regiment's deputy commander confessed to the insurgent staff and became a double agent for the Kontrrazvedka, which monitored the conspiracy for six weeks. The insurgent counterintelligence discovered that Polonsky had transferred to Katerynoslav in order to poison Nestor Makhno and other members of the insurgent high command, including those being treated for typhus. The insurgent staff did not believe that a coup was possible, as only 10% of the army consisted of former Red soldiers and only 1% were members of the CPU. They commissioned the Kontrrazvedka to investigate, which confirmed the existence of the conspiracy and assigned an agent to infiltrate it.

== Execution ==
On 2 December (according to Vyacheslav Azarov) or 4 December 1919 (according to Michael Malet), Polonsky and his co-conspirators attended a meeting of the local CPU committee, where they gave a report on their activities. One of those who was briefed was supposedly a representative of the Central Committee of the CPU, but was actually an agent of the Kontrrazvedka. The conspirators told him of their intention to poison the insurgent high command, including Makhno himself. After the meeting, Polonsky went to a conference of the insurgent command staff, where he set the plan into motion.

After the conference ended late at night, Polonsky invited Makhno and other members of the insurgent high command back to his apartment for a party. His wife Tatyana, a professional actress, was to serve Makhno a poisoned beverage. But when Polonsky opened the door, expecting his guests, he was greeted by the Kontrrazvedka, led by Semen Karetnyk. They arrested Polonsky and his accomplices, including his wife, his second-in-command Semchenko, a Red Army court martial president named Vainer, and another conspirator.

Four more co-conspirators later arrived at the apartment, where they were likewise arrested. One of them was discovered with documents from the plotters' earlier meetings, and the food and beverages that would have been served at the party were found to have been poisoned with strychnine. According to a report by Lev Zadov, the poison food had been tested by Oleksiy Chubenko. The Kontrrazvedka swiftly sentenced the leaders of the conspiracy to death and they were summarily executed by firing squad. The sentence was confirmed by the Kontrrazvedka in a report dated to 16:00 on 2 December, although historian Vyacheslav Azarov believes this was written after the fact to cover up the hasty summary execution.

The execution was carried out by Karetnyk, Hryhory Vasylivsky and Oleksandr Lepechenko outside the Kontrrazvedka headquarters, on the bank of the Dnipro river. Bolshevik sources differ on when and how the execution was carried out: a 1922 article in Proletarskaya Revolyutsiya says all the conspirators were executed on 5 December; but a 1925 report by Letopis Revolyutsii says Polonsky was separated from the group and shot immediately after his arrest. Fearing the same treatment, the remaining conspirators went underground.

== Aftermath ==
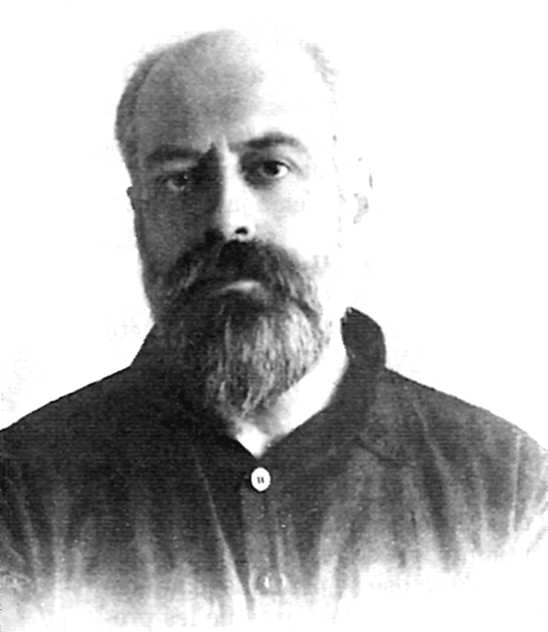
Volin, a leading anarchist of the Makhnovshchina, who voiced his opposition to the summary execution of the conspirators

Members of the CPU, supported by members of the Nabat such as Peter Arshinov and Volin, appealed for the remaining conspirators to receive a public trial. But the insurgent command had already given orders to immediately shoot conspirators that occupied positions of command in the army. When the executions were challenged by the VRS, Makhno justified his actions by detailing the plans of the conspirators and even claiming that they were agents of the White movement. After a brief confrontation between the two, the VRS agreed to establish a commission to investigate the affair, which was to be led by Volin, Viktor Bilash and Mikhail Uralov. The VRS and the insurgent command eventually formed an agreement, in which the former would confine itself to civilian affairs, while the latter would be solely concerned with military matters.

Despite the fallout from the conspiracy, the Bolsheviks did not fall under heavier persecution in the aftermath, with the party still being able to operate openly and the Zvezda remaining in publication. The summary execution of the conspirators had already caused a rift within the Insurgent Army, as both communists and anarchists contested it, due to such actions technically requiring sanction from civilian bodies of the Makhnovshchina. This caused relations between the communists and anarchists to further deteriorate. In the subsequent weeks, the Bolshevik underground in Katerynoslav reorganised itself. By 1 January 1920, the city's revolutionary committee had seized power and allowed the Red Army to reenter the city, reestablishing the rule of the Ukrainian Soviet Socialist Republic. This culminated in the beginning of open conflict between the Bolsheviks and Makhnovists.

== Bibliography ==
- Azarov, Vyacheslav (2008). Kontrrazvedka - The Story of the Makhnovist Intelligence Service. Translated by Archibald, Malcolm. Edmonton: Black Cat Press. ISBN 978-0-9737827-2-1. OCLC 233786926.
- Darch, Colin (2020). Nestor Makhno and Rural Anarchism in Ukraine, 1917-1921. London: Pluto Press. ISBN 9781786805263. OCLC 1225942343.
- Footman, David (1961). "Makhno". Civil War in Russia. Praeger Publications in Russian History and World Communism. Vol. 114. New York: Praeger. pp. 245–302. OCLC 254495418.
- Malet, Michael (1982). Nestor Makhno in the Russian Civil War. London: Palgrave Macmillan. ISBN 978-0-333-25969-6. OCLC 8514426.
- Shubin, Aleksandr (2010). "The Makhnovist Movement and the National Question in the Ukraine, 1917–1921". In Hirsch, Steven J.; van der Walt, Lucien (eds.). Anarchism and Syndicalism in the Colonial and Postcolonial World, 1870–1940. Studies in Global Social History. Vol. 6. Leiden: Brill. pp. 147–191. ISBN 9789004188495. OCLC 868808983.
- Skirda, Alexandre (2004) [1982]. Nestor Makhno–Anarchy's Cossack: The Struggle for Free Soviets in the Ukraine 1917–1921. Translated by Sharkey, Paul. Oakland: AK Press. ISBN 978-1-902593-68-5. OCLC 60602979.
