= Chubenko =

Chubenko (Ukrainian: Чубенко) is a Ukrainian surname. Notable people with the surname include:

- Oleksiy Chubenko (1889–?), Ukrainian anarchist
- Stepan Chubenko (1997–2014), Ukrainian football player
