= Foma Kozhyn =

Ukrainian revolutionary (died 1921)

- Хома (Фома) Гордійович Кожин
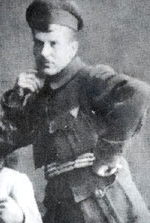
- Born: c. 1890s Katerynivka, Katerynoslav, Russian Empire
- Died: 22 July 1921; Taganrog, Donetsk, Ukrainian SSR
- Military career
- Allegiance: Makhnovshchina
- Service: Revolutionary Insurgent Army of Ukraine
- Service years: 1918–1921
- Rank: Otaman
- Commands: Machine-gun Regiment
- Conflicts: Ukrainian War of Independence; Battle of Peregonovka; Northern Taurida Operation; Siege of Perekop

Foma Kozhyn (Ukrainian: Хома (Фома) Гордійович Кожин, romanized: Khoma (Foma) Hordiiovych Kozhyn) was a Ukrainian revolutionary and the commander of the machine-gun regiment of the Revolutionary Insurgent Army of Ukraine.

== Biography ==
Foma Kozhyn was born into a peasant family, at the end of the 19th century, in the village of Katerynivka, in the Katerynoslav province of the Russian Empire (modern-day Donetsk Oblast, Ukraine).

In December 1918, he became the commander of an insurgent detachment and, at the beginning of 1919, he became commander of the machine-gun team of the 13th Soviet Regiment. He served as commander of a machine-gun regiment and brigade.

Despite the integration of the insurgents into the Red Army, tensions between the two factions heightened over time, culminating with the insurgents being declared outlaws by the Bolshevik government in June 1919. On 20 June 1919, in the region of Kichkas, Nestor Makhno took command of the machine-gun team from Foma Kozhyn, who was being actively hunted by the commissars. On 27 June, the Red Special Detachment headed by Kirill Medvedev arrived in Kichkas to arrest Kozhyn, but during the arrest they were captured by Kozhyn's machine gunners and shot. In the face of assaults by both the Reds and the Whites, the insurgents resolved to retreat into the west.

During the reorganisation of the Revolutionary Insurgent Army in the autumn of 1919, Kozhyn was assigned command of a machine-gun regiment and 300 infantry. Following their victory over the Volunteer Army at the Battle of Peregonovka, the insurgents swept throughout southern Ukraine and captured most of the region from the White movement. On 12 October 1919, Kozhyn led his machine-gun regiment in the occupation of Yuzivka, where he stayed for three to four days, before withdrawing. When Bolshevik cells began to form within the ranks of the Insurgent Army, as part of the Polonsky conspiracy, Kozhyn's machine gun regiment was one of the only units in Oleksandrivsk that remained free of Bolshevik influence, alongside Fedir Shchus' cavalry regiment. When conflict broke out between the Bolsheviks and Makhnovists in early 1920, Kozhyn continued to lead his machine-gun regiment in the 3,000-strong insurgent core, as part of a period of sustained guerrilla warfare.

After the ratification of the Starobilsk agreement, which established an alliance between the Bolsheviks and Makhnovists, the insurgents were able to retake their capital of Huliaipole, before being ordered to continue with their offensive operations. While Makhno himself remained behind in Huliaipole, Kozhyn and his machine-gun regiment continued on, as part of the detachment led by Semen Karetnyk. Along the way, the insurgent detachment captured Oleksandrivsk and Melitopol, pushing the Russian Army all the way back to Crimea. On 9 November, Mikhail Frunze ordered the Insurgent Army to cross the Syvash. Early in the morning, Kozhyn's machine gun regiment followed Oleksiy Marchenko's insurgent cavalry over the crossing, under heavy fire, which seriously wounded Kozhyn himself. Once the crossing was made, the insurgents and other units of the Red Army managed to drive back the Russian Army into a retreat. An attempted counterattack by the Kuban Cossacks, led by Ivan Barbovich, was repelled by Kozhyn's machine-gun regiment. This reinforced the Soviet flank and allowed them to continue their offensive, eventually forcing the White movement to evacuate from Crimea. A report by August Kork, commander of the 6th Red Army, attributed a leading role in the Soviet victory to Kozhyn's machine-gun regiment.

Following the Soviet victory over the White movement, the Bolsheviks turned on the Makhnovshchina, attacking the Crimean insurgent units. Karetnyk himself was assassinated, but his detachment managed to escape from the Bolshevik assault in Crimea. The insurgents shifted once again into guerrilla warfare, with Kozhyn leading an isolated detachment against the Red Army. In March 1921, the detachment led by Shchus and Kozhyn managed to reestablish contact with Nestor Makhno, who subsequently ordered them to rendezvous with other insurgent units in Poltava. In May 1921, Kozhyn made the rendezvous, which drew together 2,000 cavalry and multiple infantry regiments, in order to attack Bolshevik requisitioning units in eastern Ukraine. Over the subsequent months, the insurgents faced continuous losses, with many being captured or killed.

On 22 July 1921, Roberts Eidemanis telegraphed the Red Army command in Kharkiv and demanded the execution of Foma Kozhyn, who was lined up before a firing squad and shot.

== Bibliography ==
- Bilash, Viktor (1993). The Roads of Nestor Makhno (PDF). РВЦ "Проза". ISBN 5-7707-3814-6.
- Darch, Colin (2020). Nestor Makhno and Rural Anarchism in Ukraine, 1917–1921. London: Pluto Press. ISBN 978-0-7453-3888-0.
- Malet, Michael (1982). Nestor Makhno in the Russian Civil War. London: Palgrave Macmillan. pp. 45–53. ISBN 978-0-333-25969-6. OCLC 8514426.
- Skirda, Alexandre (2004) [1982]. Nestor Makhno: Anarchy's Cossack. Translated by Sharkey, Paul. Edinburgh: AK Press. ISBN 1-902593-68-5. OCLC 58872511.
