= 51st Rifle Division =

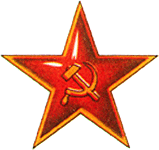
- Army star of the USSR armed forces, here a version of the metallic five-pronged Soviet star, wore by the personnel of the Workers' and Peasants' Red Army (RA), and later Soviet Army (SA), since the 1920s.
- Active: 1919–1946
- Country: Soviet Union
- Branch: Red Army
- Type: Infantry
- Size: Division
- Engagements: Russian Civil War: Petropavlovsk Offensive; Kakhovka Bridgehead; Perekop-Chongar Offensive; Soviet invasion of Poland; Winter War; World War II: Operation München; Battle of Rostov; Barvinkove-Losowaja Operation; Second Battle of Kharkov; Battle of Voronezh; Vitebsk-Orsha Offensive; Siauliai Offensive; Battle of Königsberg
- Decorations: Order of Lenin (1st formation); Order of the Red Banner; Order of Suvorov 2nd class (2nd formation)
- Battle honours: Perekop (1st formation); Vitebsk (2nd formation)

Commanders
- Notable commanders: Vasily Blyukher; Pavel Dybenko

The 51st Rifle Division was an infantry division of the Soviet Army, formed twice. Its first formation was formed during the Russian Civil War and fought in the Perekop-Chongar Offensive in 1920. It also fought in the Soviet invasion of Poland, Winter War and World War II. During World War II, it fought in the Battle of Rostov, Barvinkove-Losowaja Operation and Second Battle of Kharkov before being destroyed at the Battle of Voronezh. Officially disbanded on 28 November 1942, the division was reformed on 15 April 1943 from the 15th Rifle Brigade. The 2nd formation fought in Operation Bagration and the Battle of Königsberg. It was disbanded in an executive order by Premier Joseph Stalin in 1946.

== History ==
=== First formation ===
On 6 July 1919, 3rd Army commander Sergey Mezheninov issued Order No. 158, forming the 51st Rifle Division, part of the Northern Expeditionary Unit. The formation took place in Tyumen, where the 151st, 152nd and 153rd Brigades were formed. The organization of the division was completed by 15 August, when division commander Vasily Blyukher issued his first order, defining the divisional structure. The division included headquarters, the political department, logistics and other services, three brigades of three infantry regiments each (numbered from 450th to 458th), communications and engineering battalions, and armored car detachments. Blyukher himself arrived in Tyumen on 19 August and established his headquarters in the house of the merchant Kolokolnikov.

During the final phase of the Petropavlovsk Operation in the fall of 1919, the 151st Brigade advanced on Ishim. The 152nd Brigade moved to Tobolsk, and the 153rd Brigade was held in reserve in Tyumen. At the end of November, it became part of the 5th Army. After the defeat of the White Army led by Alexander Kolchak, the division was relocated to Novonikolayevsk. The division became part of the high command of the Red Army's reserve on 1 January 1920. The division was tasked with the repair of the Siberian railway and the Cheremhovsky coal mines, destroyed during the Russian Civil War.

On 4 July, the division received orders to transfer to the Southern Front to fight against White Army units led by Pyotr Nikolayevich Wrangel. The advance echelons of the division arrived at Apostolove station in early August. On 3 August, the division was included in the group of forces on the right bank of the Dnieper and concentrated near Berislavlya. The 13th Army command began an offensive on 6 August to smash the White Army units between the Dnieper and the Crimean Isthmus. The main attack was assigned to the 52nd Rifle Division and Latvian Rifle Division. The 51st Rifle Division was placed in the second echelon of the attack without being given time to fully concentrate. On the night of 7 August, the 52nd and Latvian divisions crossed the Dnieper, captured Kakhovka and Alyosha, and began to advance on Melitopol. The 51st followed them across the Dnieper and began building defences in the area of Kakhovka.

Engineering of the Kakhovka Defense

Meanwhile, the attack of the group of forces on the left bank of the Dnieper was repulsed from the beginning, allowing Wrangel to concentrate more forces against the 52nd and Latvian divisions. Both divisions were forced to retreat to the Kakhovka bridgehead, now held by the 51st Rifle Division. White attempts to reach the Dnieper were repulsed by the 51st Rifle Division. Firmly entrenched in the bridgehead, the division routed opposing forces during 13th Army's second offensive on 21 August. On 27 August, the division reached the area of Serogozy. During battles in the Serogozy area on 28–29 August, the division reportedly inflicted heavy losses on the White units and conducted an orderly retreat to the bridgehead. At the end of September, Southern Front was created under command of Mikhail Frunze. The group of forces on the right bank was disbanded and became 6th Army. The 51st Rifle Division was ordered to firmly defend the Kakhovka bridgehead from the planned White Army attack.

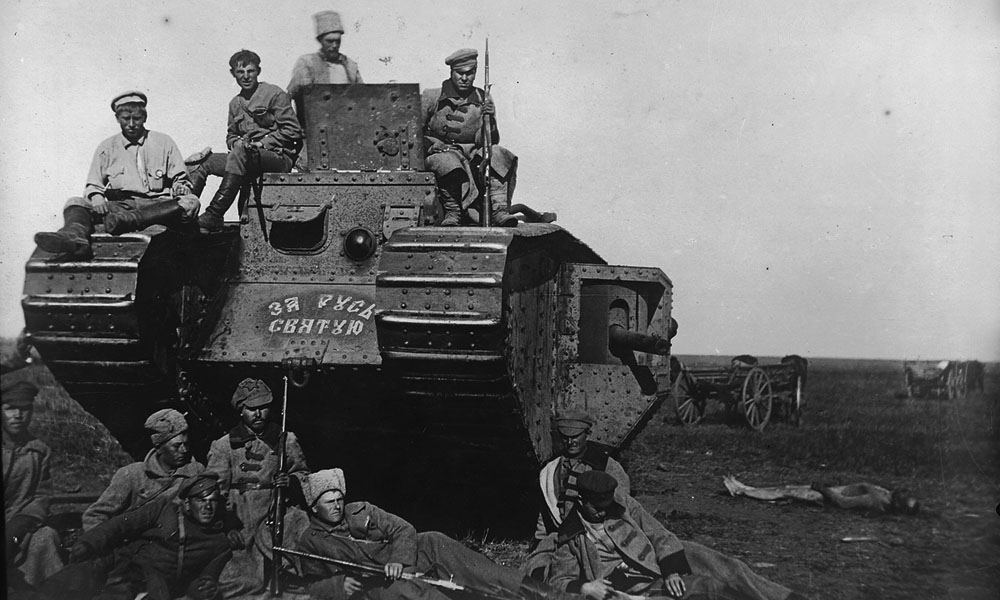
British-made Mark IV tank used by White Army, captured 14 October 1920 in the Kakhovka bridgehead

During October, the division constructed a defensive line in the bridgehead. The line had a length of 40 kilometers and a depth of 12 kilometers. Its antitank defences were based on field artillery and antitank ditches, as well as landmines. On 14 October, the White Army made a last desperate attack to capture the bridgehead and throw the 51st back across the Dnieper. Despite tank support, the White Army attack failed. In preparation for the final Red Army offensive, the division received reinforcements. The division's objective was to destroy the White 2nd Corps and capture the White fortifications on the Perekop Isthmus. The 51st, 15th and Latvian Rifle Divisions, a separate cavalry brigade, cavalry regiment, and armored car detachment formed the Perekop Strike Group. The attack began on 28 October and the division had captured Perekop by the next day. The division renewed the attack on 30 October, but was unable to overrun the Turetsky Val and had to dig in. Blyukher had the advance units withdrawn from within a range of White fire.

Positions of the Southern Front from October 26 to 31

On 30 October, Blyukher ordered the 151st Brigade to reconnoiter the Perekop Gulf for a possible crossing. He also ordered the 153rd Brigade to reconnoiter Syvash. On 1 November, Blyukher offered to allow the White Army units to surrender. On 7 November, the Perekop-Chongar Offensive was begun. The division attempted to storm the Turetsky Val but was unable to break through by the next day. During the night, elements of the division crossed Syvash and emerged in the White rear. With a simultaneous frontal attack, this assault captured the Turetsky Val. The 51st Rifle Division continued to advance and broke through the Yushunskaya positions with the aid of the Latvian Rifle Division. The capture of the Yushinskaya position ended organized White resistance in the Crimea.

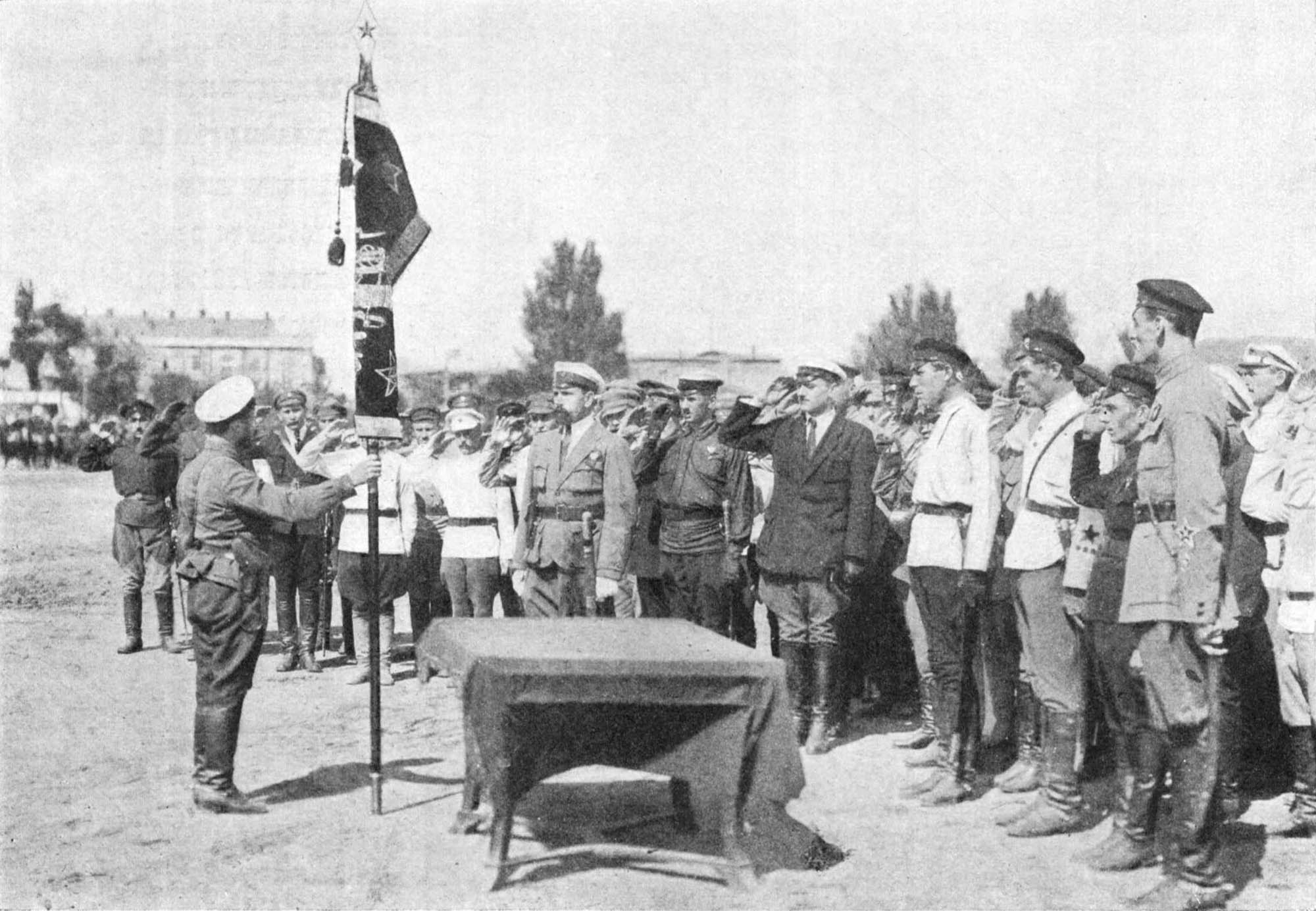
Mikhail Frunze presents divisional commander Pavel Dybenko with an honorary revolutionary red banner in Crimea in 1921

On 13 October, it became the 51st Moscow Rifle Division. On 14 September 1921, the division was awarded the Order of the Red Banner. It became the 51st Perekop Red Banner on behalf of the Moscow Soviet Workers, Peasants, and Red Army Deputies Rifle Division. At the same time, the division was awarded the Order of the Red Banner of Labour of the Ukrainian SSR by the Central Election Commission. In December 1935, the division was awarded the Order of Lenin for the 15th anniversary of the fighting at Perekop.

In September 1939, the 51st became part of the Ukrainian Front for the Soviet invasion of Poland, but did not see combat. The division fought in the Winter War as part of the 7th Army from January to April 1940. Five soldiers of the division were awarded the title Hero of the Soviet Union for their actions during the war. In June 1940, the division participated in the Soviet occupation of Bessarabia as part of the 14th Rifle Corps.On 22 June 1941, the division was part of the 14th Rifle Corps of the 9th Army in the Odessa Military District. The division was based in the Danube Delta area. It fought against advancing German troops in Operation München. It retreated to the Prut and then the Dniester near Dubăsari. The division then was forced to retreat to the Southern Bug and the Dnieper at Kakhovka and Kherson. By November 1941, the division was in the Donbas. On 16 November, the division, now part of the 37th Army, attacked in the direction of Pavlovka and Taganrog. On 27 November, the division participated in the Battle of Rostov. The division did not break through until 29 November and advanced to Sultan-Saly. In January 1942, the division transferred to fight in the Barvenkovo-Lozovaya Operation and was on the Donets. In late July, the division was withdrawn on the Don and across the Manych. It was disbanded on 16 August and its personnel transferred to other units.

=== Second formation ===
The division was formed again on 12 July 1943 from the 15th Rifle Brigade. The division was relocated to Makhachkala and became part of the Baku Military District's 124th Rifle Corps in the winter of 1945–46. As part of the corps it was to land in northern Iran if necessary. The division and its corps were disbanded by May 1946.

== Composition ==
The 51st Rifle Division's first formation included the following units during World War II.

- 23rd Rifle Regiment
- 287th Rifle Regiment
- 348th Rifle Regiment
- 263rd Rifle Regiment (from 12 July 1941, transferred from 25th Rifle Division)
- 218th Artillery Regiment (until 25 January 1942)
- 300th Artillery Regiment (from 25 January 1942)
- 277th Separate Antitank Battalion
- 231st Anti-Aircraft Artillery Battery (later 165th Separate Anti-Aircraft Artillery Battalion)
- 774th Mortar Battalion
- 30th Reconnaissance Battalion
- 44th Sapper Battalion
- 50th Separate Communications Battalion
- 115th Medical Battalion
- 60th Separate Chemical Defence Company
- 57th Trucking Company
- 60th (later 65th) Field Bakery
- 159th (later 1495th) Field Post Office
- 346th Field Ticket Office of the State Bank

The 51st Rifle Division's second formation included the following units.

- 23rd Rifle Regiment
- 287th Rifle Regiment
- 348th Rifle Regiment
- 300th Rifle Regiment
- 91st Separate Antitank Battalion
- 30th Intelligence Company
- 44th Sapper Battalion
- 207th Separate Communications Battalion (later 653rd Separate Communications Company)
- 115th Medical Battalion
- 60th Separate Chemical Defence Company
- 125th Trucking Company
- 309th Field Bakery
- 84th Divisional Veterinary Hospital
- 1628th Field Post Office
- 34th (later 1657th) Field Ticket Office of the State Bank

== Sources ==
- Dvoinykh, L.V.; Kariaeva, T.F.; Stegantsev, M.V., eds. (1993). ЦЕНТРАЛЬНЫЙ ГОСУДАРСТВЕННЫЙ АРХИВ СОВЕТСКОЙ АРМИИ [Central State Archive of the Soviet Army] (in Russian). Vol. 2. Minneapolis: Eastview Publications. ISBN 1879944030. Archived from the original on 2016-12-03.
- Feskov, V.I.; Golikov, V.I.; Kalashnikov, K.A.; Slugin, S.A. (2013). Вооруженные силы СССР после Второй Мировой войны: от Красной Армии к Советской [The Armed Forces of the USSR after World War II: From the Red Army to the Soviet: Part 1 Land Forces] (in Russian). Tomsk: Scientific and Technical Literature Publishing. ISBN 9785895035306.
