= Monument to the heroes of Perekop =

Monument in Moscow, Russia

Coordinates: 55°39′33″N 37°34′37″E

- Памятник героям Перекопа
- Interactive map of Monument to the heroes of Perekop
- Location: Moscow, Perekopskaya Str.
- Opening date: 1972

Monument to the heroes of Perekop (Russian: Памятник героям Перекопа) is a memorial sign installed in Moscow on Perekopskaya street near the intersection with Sevastopol Avenue on November 15, 1972. The monument is dedicated to the Siege of Perekop during the Russian Civil War in the autumn of 1920 and the Crimean Offensive by the Red Army in the spring of 1944.

The memorial sign is a wall of red granite standing on two granite blocks depicting an image of a Red Army man in Budyonovka and a soldier wearing a helmet. On the left part, the inscription "Heroes of Perekop. 1920-1944" is written. On the opposite side, divisions which participated in the battles for the dig in 1920 and 1944 are listed. The monument is installed on an open area lined with light plates and framed flower beds.

The monument was constructed by the initiative and means of students of the neighboring school No. 531 (now the structural subdivision No. 2 of the school No. 554), where the history of the heroes of Perekop was studied for a long time. The monument is made in accordance to the sketch of the school student Vadim Ermolaev. The creation of the memorial was also attended by the architect VL Voskresensky and the head of the school circle of fine arts Yu. S. Zimin.

The monument belongs to the category of "urban sculpture". Annually on Victory Day, flowers are placed on the monument.
