= Mikhail Fostikov =

Cossack general in the Russian army

Mikhail Arkhipovich Fostikov
- Born: 6 September [O.S. August 25] 1886; Cherkessk, Kuban Oblast, Russian Empire
- Died: 29 July 1966 (aged 79); Belgrade, Yugoslavia (now Serbia)
- Burial place: Stara Pazova, Serbia
- Military career
- Allegiance: Russian Empire; Russian Republic
- Branch: (Russian Empire) Imperial Russian Army (Russian Republic) White Army
- Service years: 1907–1920
- Rank: Lieutenant General
- Commands: 1st Kuban Cossack Regiment (1918-1919); Kuban Mounted Brigade (1919); 2nd Kuban Cossack Division (1919-1920)
- Conflicts: World War I Russian Civil War

Mikhail Arkhipovich Fostikov (Russian: Михаи́л Архи́пович Фо́стиков; 6 September [O.S. 25 August] 1886 – 29 July 1966) was a Cossack officer in the Imperial Russian Army and an officer of the counterrevolutionary White Movement during the Russian Civil War, reaching the rank of lieutenant general.

== Biography ==
Fostikov was born in Batalpashinsk (now Cherkessk, Karachay-Cherkessia Republic, Russia). His father was an officer with the Kuban Cossacks. He graduated from the Alexander Military Law Academy in 1907 and the Nikolaev Academy of the General Staff, Russia's senior staff college, in 1917. During World War I he served as a junior officer in the 1st Labinsk Cossack Regiment on the Caucasus Front.

Fostikov returned to the Kuban after the October Revolution and joined the White movement at Stavropol. In the summer of 1918 he established the 1st Kuban Cossack Regiment under Andrei Shkuro. He later banded together with the Volunteer Army with his regiment integrated into the 2nd Kuban Cossack Division under Sergei Ulagay. In September 1919 Fostikov was promoted to commander of the Kuban Mounted Brigade and the 1st Kuban Regiment as part of Shkuro's Kuban Corps. In December he was given command of the 2nd Kuban Cossack Division.

In February 1920 Fostikov was wounded near Stavropol and he was separated from the Kuban forces. His soldiers conveyed him to Batalpashinsk, where he formed a White partisan group, the People's Army for the Regeneration of Russia in May. His units operated behind enemy lines during the unsuccessful landing of Kuban Cossacks under Ulagay on the Taman Peninsula that summer. He led his forces into the Democratic Republic of Georgia before they were eventually evacuated to Feodosia in Crimea to join the forces of Pyotr Wrangel. Fostikov commanded an independent Kuban Cossack Brigade from September to November, fighting against the Red Army attempting to enter the peninsula across the Syvash wetlands. He was evacuated along with the rest of Wrangel's forces to Turkey.

Fostikov spent seven months in camps on Lemnos before in June 1921 departing to Yugoslavia, where he worked as a teacher. He was arrested after the Belgrade Offensive by Soviet forces but was released. He died in a Belgrade hospital in 1966 and is buried at Stara Pazova in Serbia.

== See also ==
- Kuban Cossacks
- White movement
- Volunteer Army
- Russian Civil War

== Sources ==
- Kenez, Peter (1977). Civil War in South Russia, 1919-1920, Volume II: The Defeat of the Whites. Berkeley, CA: University of California Press. ISBN 0-520-03346-9.
- Mueggenberg, Brent (2019). The Cossack Struggle Against Communism, 1917-1945. Jefferson, NC: McFarland & Company. ISBN 978-1-4766-3802-7.
- Smele, Jonathan (2015). Historical Dictionary of the Russian Civil Wars, 1916–1926. New York: Rowman & Littlefield. ISBN 978-1-4422-5281-3.
