= Dybenko =

Dybenko (Ukrainian: Дибенко; Russian: Дыбенко) is a Ukrainian surname. Notable people with the surname include:

- Heorhiy Dybenko (born 1928), Soviet athlete
- Pavel Dybenko (1889–1938), Bolshevik revolutionary
