= Maksim Cherednyak =

Belarusian anarchist (b. 1883)

- מאַקסים טשערעדניאַק
- Born: 1883; Grodno, Russian Empire
- Military career
- Allegiance: Makhnovshchina
- Service: Revolutionary Insurgent Army of Ukraine
- Service years: 1917–1922
- Conflicts: Ukrainian War of Independence; Ukraine Offensive

Maksim Matveevich Cherednyak (Belarusian: Максім Матвеевіч Чарадняк; b. 1883) was a Belarusian Jewish anarchist, a member of the Makhnovist movement and commander of the Katerynoslav infantry regiment.

== Biography ==
Cherednyak was born into a Jewish family in Grodno in 1883. He was a hairdresser by profession. From 1904 to 1905, he was an associate of the Bialystok anarchist, the "Headless" Striga, and participated in terrorist acts in Belarus and Poland. From 1907 to 1917 he lived in America and France, before moving to Ukraine in the wake of the Russian Revolution.

In 1917, he organized an anarchist miners' fighting detachment in Makeyevka, at the head of which he participated in battles with the Don Cossacks and German troops.

In December 1918, Cherednyak's detachment took part in the Ukraine Offensive, on 2 January 1919; together with a detachment of the left Socialist-Revolutionary Yuriy Sablin, Cherednyak captured Kharkiv and established the Ukrainian Socialist Soviet Republic. A few days later, his detachment was disarmed and he was arrested by order of the new Ukrainian Soviet government.

After his release in the spring of 1919, he joined the Makhnovist movement. He acted as regiment commander of the Makhno brigade, then head of the formation department at the brigade headquarters and head of counterintelligence in Berdyansk.

In June 1919 he was captured by the Whites in Huliaipole. He was tortured but managed to escape.

In October 1919, the Makhnovist headquarters sent detachments of Syrovatsky and Cherednyak to destroy Denikin's rear.

In 1922 he was arrested by the OGPU; on 11 May 1923 he was sentenced to two years of exile in Narym.

With the end of the term of exile he emigrated, in 1930, and became a member of the anarchist movement abroad.

== Bibliography ==
- Arkhireyskyy, D.V. (2015). Махновська веремія. Тернистий шлях Революційної повстанської армії України (махновців) 1918—1921 (PDF). науково-популярне видання. (in Ukrainian). Kyiv: Tempora. p. 69.
- Sidak, V.; Ostashko, T.; Vronska, T. (2009). Полковник Петро Болбочан: трагедія українського державника (PDF) (in Ukrainian). Kyiv: Tempora. p. 335.
- Материалы к биографическому словарю социалистов и анархистов (in Russian). Moscow: НИПЦ «Мемориал».
- Khaplanov, N.; Khaplanova, E. (2011). "10.1. Маяк Макеевки". Полыхала гражданская война (in Russian).
