= Oleksiy Chubenko =

Ukrainian commander of Makhno Army

- Олексій Васильович Чубенко
- Born: Oleksiy Vasylovych Chubenko; 1889; Hryhorivka, Oleksandrivsky, Katerynoslav, Russian Empire
- Military career
- Allegiance: Makhnovshchina
- Service: Revolutionary Insurgent Army of Ukraine
- Service years: 1917–1921
- Conflicts: Ukrainian War of Independence

Oleksiy Vasylovych Chubenko (Ukrainian: Олексій Васильович Чубенко; b. 1889) was a diplomat for the Revolutionary Insurgent Army of Ukraine.

== Biography ==
In 1918, after the German Empire occupied Huliaipole and Nestor Makhno left for Russia, Chubenko became the commissar of the Tsarevo-Kostantinovka railway junction, was arrested by the Germans, and sentenced to death by the Petliurites, but he fled during the execution. Until June 1918, he worked at the Yamskaya station of the Kursk region. After Makhno returned to Ukraine, Chubenko took a position as adjutant to the partisan leader, as well as the treasurer and head of the subversive team for the Revolutionary Insurgent Army of Ukraine (RIAU).

Following the capture of an extensive territory by the RIAU in November 1918, Chubenko met with the local commander of the Ukrainian People's Army in Katerynoslav, working out an agreement between the two forces for an alliance against the White movement. But this alliance quickly proved stillborn after the UPA broke up the local soviet. The RIAU subsequently intervened on the side of the soviet and a battle broke out for control of the city. After several days of fighting, the UPA retook the city from the RIAU.

By January 1919, the UPA abandoned the city to the Red Army under Pavel Dybenko. On 26 January, Chubenko was dispatched by the RIAU general staff to negotiate an agreement with Dybenko, resulting in the RIAU being integrated into the 3rd Trans-Dnepr Brigade.

From March to July 1919, he was a diplomat in the Makhnovshchina and the chairman of many commissions negotiated with Dybenko on the conclusion of an alliance. In March 1919, after the occupation of Mariupol by the Makhnovists, he took part in negotiations with the French representatives of the Entente on the transfer of coal from the port to the French.

During the RIAU's meeting with the green armies of Kherson, Chubenko spoke out against the ataman Nykyfor Hryhoriv, whom he accused of collaborating with the White movement and participating in antisemitic pogroms. Hryhoriv responded by attempting to shoot the RIAU's commander Nestor Makhno, but Chubenko beat him to the draw and shot Hryhoriv first. Chubenko took responsibility for the assassination and invited the greens to join the RIAU, consolidating their forces for a counter-offensive against the Whites. He then acted as the chairman of the diplomatic commission for concluding an agreement with Symon Petliura at the Zhmerinka station on 20 September 1919.

After the RIAU captured a vast amount of southern Ukraine from the Whites in October 1919, including the city of Katerynoslav, Chubenko participated in talks with the local Borotbists, which resulted in them joining the RIAU against the Whites. However, the Borotbists would end up joining the Bolsheviks, eventually merging into the Communist Party of Ukraine.

As part of the Starobilsk agreement between the Bolsheviks and the Makhnovists, a number of Makhnovist political prisoners were released from the Cheka's jails, one of whom was Chubenko himself. In 1930 he was still alive and non-partisan. Chubenko's memoirs would go on to serve as a primary source for the historiography of the Makhnovist movement.

== Bibliography ==
- Belash, Alexander; Belash, Victor (1993). Дороги Нестора Махно (in Russian). Kyiv: РВЦ "Проза". ISBN 5770738146. OCLC 429142607.
- Danilov, Victor Petrovich; Shanin, T. (2006). Нестор Махно: Крестьянское движение на Украине. 1918—1921: Документы и материалы. Крестьянская революция в России. 1902—1922 гг.: Документы и материалы (in Russian). Moscow: ROSSPEN. p. 1000. ISBN 5824307695. OCLC 741204339.
- Darch, Colin (2020). Nestor Makhno and Rural Anarchism in Ukraine, 1917–1921. London: Pluto Press. ISBN 978-0-7453-3888-0.
- Malet, Michael (1982). Nestor Makhno in the Russian Civil War. London: Palgrave Macmillan. ISBN 978-0-333-25969-6. OCLC 8514426.
- Patterson, Sean (2020). Makhno and Memory: Anarchist and Mennonite Narratives of Ukraine's Civil War, 1917–1921. Univ. of Manitoba Press. ISBN 978-0-88755-578-7.
- Skirda, Alexandre (2004) [1982]. Nestor Makhno: Anarchy's Cossack. Translated by Sharkey, Paul. Edinburgh: AK Press. ISBN 1-902593-68-5. OCLC 58872511.
