= Semen Karetnyk =

Ukrainian revolutionary (1893–1920)

- Семе́н Мики́тович Каретник
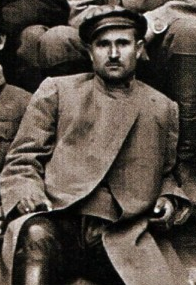
- Semen Karetnyk in October 1920
- Born: Semen Mykytovych Karetnyk; 1893; Huliaipole, Katerynoslav, Russian Empire
- Died: 26 November 1920 (aged 26–27); Melitopol, Katerynoslav, Ukrainian Socialist Soviet Republic
- Military career
- Allegiance: Russian Empire (1914–1917); Makhnovshchina (1918–1920)
- Service: Imperial Russian Army (1914–1917); Revolutionary Insurgent Army of Ukraine (1918–1920)
- Service years: 1914–1920
- Rank: Ataman
- Commands: Crimean Corps
- Conflicts: First World War; Eastern Front; Russian Civil War; Ukrainian War of Independence; Battle of Dibrivka; Battle of Peregonovka; Northern Taurida Operation; Siege of Perekop

Semen Mykytovych Karetnyk (Ukrainian: Семе́н Мики́тович Каретник; 1893 – 1920) was a Ukrainian anarchist revolutionary and military commander in the Revolutionary Insurgent Army of Ukraine (RIAU). He often replaced Nestor Makhno as supreme commander of the Insurgent Army in 1920. Karetnyk gained a reputation for his central role in defeating the White Army in Crimea in November 1920.

== Biography ==
Semen Karetnyk was born into extreme poverty, growing up a poor peasant in the small southern Ukrainian town of Huliaipole. He worked as a hostler until the outbreak of World War I, upon which he was drafted into military service and worked his way through the ranks until he became an ensign. By the time of the Russian Revolution, Karetnyk had gained much military experience, which he utilized upon his return to Ukraine, when he became a leading partisan of the Makhnovshchina. Karetnyk's strong anarchist convictions brought him into the favor of the local revolutionary leader Nestor Makhno, with Karetnyk going on to become the second-in-command of the Revolutionary Insurgent Army of Ukraine.

Upon Makhno's return from Russia in July 1918, Karetnyk and his brother attended a meeting with other local anarchists in order to figure out how they could acquire weapons. They resolved to carry out surprise attacks against the local authorities, seizing 44,000 rubles in a bank robbery at Zherebets, and increasingly harassing the occupying Austro-Hungarian Army. Despite earlier successes, the insurgents were driven out of the region by the occupation forces. They were surrounded by Hungarian forces at Temyrivka, where half of them were killed and Karetnyk himself was wounded. They then regrouped at Orikhiv and on 27 November, they decisively retook Huliaipole. Back in their hometown, the local anarchists established a general staff for the Insurgent Army, which Karetnyk joined. On 20 December, Karetnyk led a detachment to Synelnykove, as part of a 300-to-500-strong insurgent battalion, and then on to Nyzhnyodiniprovske, arriving on Christmas. The following day they attacked the city, capturing it from the Ukrainian People's Republic by 28 December.

When the first Bolshevik-Makhnovist alliance was broken in June 1919, Karetnyk was among the anarchists of Huliaipole that accompanied Makhno's small detachment in a retreat to right-bank Ukraine. Following the formation of a temporary alliance with Nykyfor Hryhoriv's green army, Semen Karetnyk and Oleksiy Chubenko were two members of the insurgent staff that called for Hryhoriv to be disposed of and played a role in carrying out his assassination. According to the historian Clarence Manning, it was Karetnyk himself that killed Hryhoriv.

In the wake of the insurgent offensive after the battle of Peregonovka, the Oleksandrivsk Regional Congress of Peasants, Workers and Insurgents elected Karetnyk to the Third Military Revolutionary Council. On 4 December 1919, after a conference of the insurgent command in Katerynoslav, Karetnyk participated in the arrest and execution of a number of local Bolsheviks that had participated in the Polonsky conspiracy.

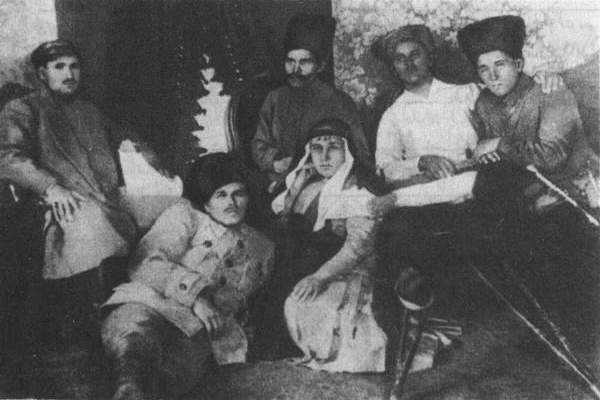
Semen Karetnyk (far left) and other insurgent commanders in Starobilsk.

On 5 January 1920, Karetnyk entered into talks with the Red Army for a truce. But the agreement between the two proved stillborn after Ieronim Uborevich ordered the insurgents to transfer to the Polish front and integrate themselves into the 12th Army. When talks between the Makhnovists and the Bolsheviks resumed in August 1920, Dmitri Popov and Semen Karetnyk were two of the insurgent command staff that argued against the proposed alliance. However, an insurgent vote on the matter secured a majority for an alliance with the Bolsheviks. On 6 October, Semen Karetnyk, Dmitri Popov and Viktor Bilash met the Bolshevik negotiator at Starobilsk to sign their provisional agreement. By the following day, they had arranged an armistice and decided that a final draft of the "Political-Military Alliance" would be agreed upon in Kharkiv.

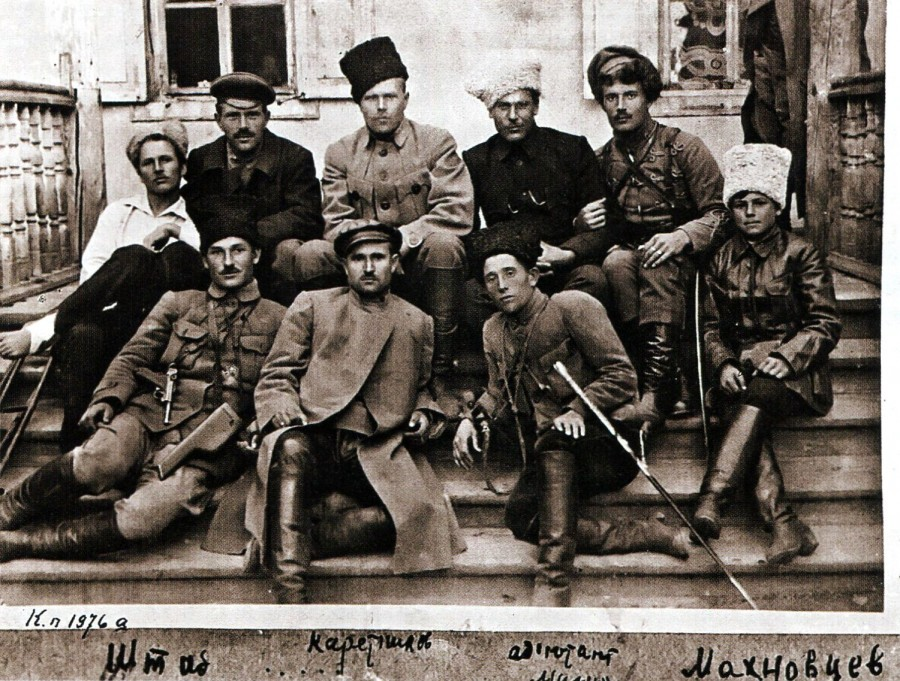
Semen Karetnyk (first row, second from the left) and other members of the insurgent general staff in October 1920.

Karetnyk subsequently returned to the front at Huliaipole, where he reestablished a general staff to coordinate the insurgent counteroffensive against the Russian Army in Tavria. At this time, the insurgent staff was split into two, with a wounded Nestor Makhno remaining in Huliaipole while Semen Karetnyk led an insurgent detachment on towards Crimea. On 22 October, the insurgents began their offensive, capturing Oleksandrivsk and Melitopol before pushing the Russian Army all the way back to Perekop.

Under the command of Mikhail Frunze, Karetnyk's Crimean detachment, along with the 6th Red Army, was ordered to penetrate the White rear and cut the road between Perekop and Simferopol at Dürmen, but their attempt to occupy the Lithuanian peninsula on 6 November was stifled after Karetnyk's insurgents were unable to ford the Sıvaş. When the water receded the following night, the Soviet units were able to cross and capture the northern side of the peninsula, but a change in wind briefly prevented Karetnyk's detachment from crossing. Semen Karetnyk, his cavalry commander Oleksiy Marchenko and machine gun commander Foma Kozhyn were then summoned to Strohanivka for a meeting with Frunze, who ordered they immediately make the crossing. The insurgents initially hesitated to go forward with this as they suspected it was a trap, but crossed into Crimea in the early morning of 7 November, while being peppered by heavy machine gun fire. By 14 November 1920, Karetnyk's detachment had occupied Simferopol and a number of other Crimean cities, forcing the Government of South Russia to evacuate and resulting in the establishment of the Crimean Autonomous Soviet Socialist Republic. Karetnyk's detachment was then ordered to take up camp at Saky, where they were subsequently surrounded by the 52nd Rifle Division, 3rd Cavalry Corps and 2nd Latvian Brigade, preventing the insurgents from leaving Crimea.

Frunze then ordered the transfer of insurgent units in Crimea to the Caucasian front, but he did not send a copy of this order to Karetnyk and concentrated Red cavalry armies around the Crimean insurgents. Frunze then alleged that the insurgents had refused their transfer to the Caucasus and claimed that they were planning an anti-Bolshevik uprising. On 26 November, the Bolsheviks moved against the Makhnovshchina, attacking the Crimean insurgent units. While en route to a Red Army command meeting, Karetnyk and his chief of staff Petro Havrylenko were arrested in Melitopol and executed by firing squad. The following day, the remains of Karetnyk's detachment were able to break through the lines of the 6th Army at Perekop and escaped to İşün, although the only survivors of his previously thousands-strong detachment were 250 of Marchenko's cavalry. On 7 December, the Crimean army linked up with Makhno's forces at Kermenchik, where they informed Makhno of Karetnyk's assassination and began to make plans for an anti-Bolshevik uprising.

== Bibliography ==
- Darch, Colin (2020). Nestor Makhno and Rural Anarchism in Ukraine, 1917-1921. London: Pluto Press. ISBN 9781786805263. OCLC 1225942343.
- Malet, Michael (1982). Nestor Makhno in the Russian Civil War. London: Palgrave Macmillan. ISBN 978-0-333-25969-6. OCLC 8514426.
- Peters, Victor (1970). Nestor Makhno: The Life of an Anarchist. Winnipeg: Echo Books. OCLC 7925080.
- Skirda, Alexandre (2004) [1982]. Nestor Makhno–Anarchy's Cossack: The Struggle for Free Soviets in the Ukraine 1917–1921. Translated by Sharkey, Paul. Oakland: AK Press. ISBN 978-1-902593-68-5. OCLC 60602979.
