= Siege of Perekop (1920) =

1920 battle of the Russian Civil War

- Part of the Southern Front of the Russian Civil War
- A map of the Soviet plan for the Perekop–Chongar operation
Date	7–17 November 1920
Location	Isthmus of Perekop and the Syvash, Crimea, South Russia 46°09′N 33°41′E
Result	Soviet–Makhnovist victory
Territorial changes	Crimean Peninsula fell under a Bolshevik administration

Belligerents
(South Russia (1919–1920)) South Russia	(Russian Soviet Federative Socialist Republic) Russian SFSR (Ukrainian Soviet Socialist Republic) Ukrainian SSR; Makhnovshchina

Commanders and leaders
(South Russia (1919–1920)) Pyotr Wrangel (South Russia (1919–1920)) Vladimir Vitkovsky (South Russia (1919–1920)) Alexander Kutepov (South Russia (1919–1920)) Mikhail Fostikov (South Russia (1919–1920)) Ivan Barbovich	Mikhail Frunze; August Kork; Filipp Mironov; Semyon Budyonny; Vasily Blyukher; Semen Karetnyk

Units involved
(South Russia (1919–1920)) Russian Army	Red Army; 1st Cavalry Army; 2nd Cavalry Army; 4th Army; 6th Army; 13th Army; Revolutionary Insurgent Army of Ukraine

Strength
(South Russia (1919–1920)) Russian Army; 41,000 bayonets and sabers; 213 artillery cannons; 1,663 machine guns; 45 tanks and armored vehicles; 14 armored trains; 42 aircraft	Southern Front; 146,400 bayonets; 40,200 sabers; 985 artillery cannons; 4,435 machine guns; 57 armored vehicles; 17 armored trains; 45 aircraft; Karetnyk Detachment; 1,000 infantry; 700 cavalry; 6 artillery cannons; 191 machine guns

Casualties and losses
(South Russia (1919–1920)) 2,000 soldiers (executed) / (surrendered)	10,000

The siege of Perekop, also known as the Perekop-Chongar Operation, was a battle of the Southern Front in the Russian Civil War and Ukrainian War of Independence from 7 to 17 November 1920. The White movement's stronghold on the Crimean Peninsula was protected by the Chongar fortification system along the strategic Isthmus of Perekop and the Syvash, from which the Crimean Corps under General Yakov Slashchov repelled several Red Army invasion attempts in early 1920. The Southern Front of the Red Army and the anarchist Revolutionary Insurgent Army of Ukraine, under the joint command of Mikhail Frunze, launched an offensive on Crimea with an invasion force four-times larger than the defenders, the White Russian Army under the command of General Pyotr Wrangel. Despite suffering heavy losses, the Reds broke through the fortifications, and the Whites were forced into retreat southwards. Following their defeat at the siege of Perekop, the Whites evacuated from the Crimea, dissolving the Army of Wrangel and ending the Southern Front in Bolshevik victory.

About 50 years later, students from Moscow created a monument of remembrance for the battle.

== Fortifications ==
The construction of fortifications on the Isthmus of Perekop began in the autumn of 1919. The Russian Army defense system consisted of two lines: Perekop (its basis was the section of the Turkish Wall with a total length of 11 km, it included an old Tatar ditch up to 10 meters deep and wide, wire fences in 3-5 rows and three lines of trenches) and Yushun (20–25 km south of the first line, from several lines of trenches covered with barbed wire).

There were also fortifications to strengthen the Chongar Peninsula and the Arabat Spit - up to 5-6 lines of trenches and trenches with barbed wire. The Lithuanian Peninsula was the only place that had relatively weakly defenses, with only one line of trenches and barbed wire.

Approximately 10,000 Russian Army soldiers defended Perekop and Yushun, while 3,000 defended the Syvash, the Chongar Strait and the Arabat Spit. Over 14,000 reserves were also located in the rear of Yushun.

== Planning ==
Initially, Mikhail Frunze had planned to deliver the main blow toward Chongar but due to the ice holding the Azov Flotilla back in Taganrog, the main attack was transferred on toward Perekop. The assault on Perekop was executed by the 6th Army, 1st Cavalry Army and 2nd Cavalry Army. Just before the operation began, 8,000 members of the Communist Party and 2,500 members of the Young Communist League arrived as reinforcements to the Red Army.

The attack by units of the 1st Cavalry Army from Henichesk, through the Arabat Spit to Feodosia, was suppressed by the fire of Wrangel's fleet, part of which approached Henichesk, so it was decided to conduct an auxiliary strike on Chongar and Arabat (by the forces of the 4th Army and the 3rd Cavalry Corps).

== Battle ==
=== Deployment and crossing the Syvash ===
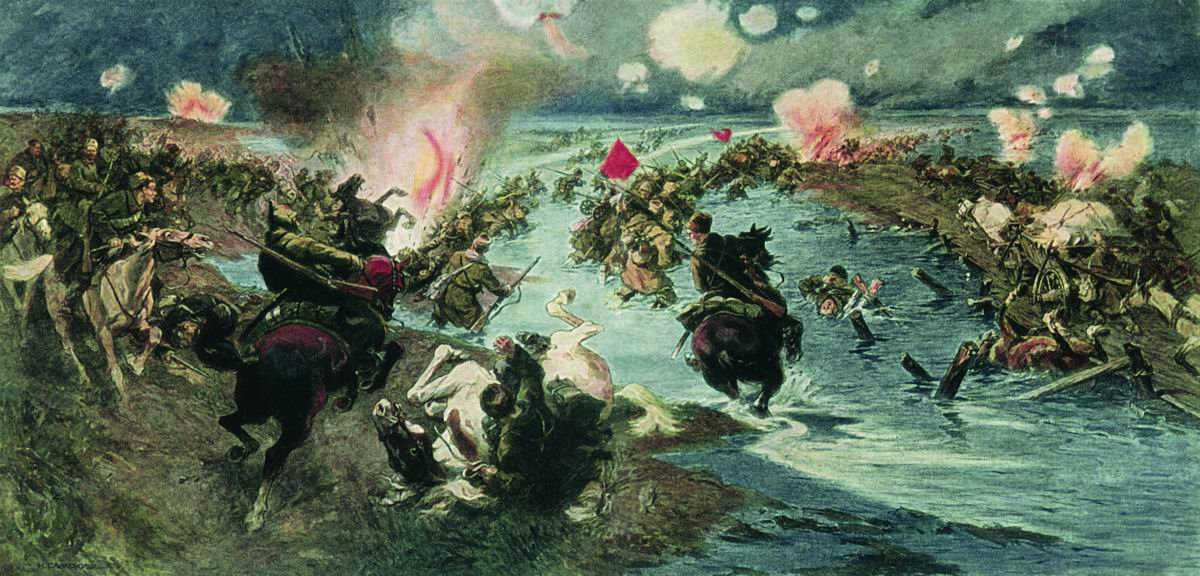
Nikolay Samokish "The Red Army Crossing the Syvash" (1935).

The Reds began the operation to capture Crimea on 3 November 1920, with another unsuccessful frontal attack on the Perekop fortifications.

Therefore, it was decided to bypass Perekop along the Syvash. On 5 November, the wind caught water in the Syvash and it was decided to wait for it to get shallower. And on the night of 8 November 1920, the shock group of the 6th Army (the 15th, 51st and 52nd divisions, a cavalry group, in total about 20,000 bayonets and sabers with 36 artillery cannons), crossed the 7-kilometer water obstacle in adverse weather conditions (strong winds and minus 11-12 degrees Celsius). And on the afternoon of 8 November, the Reds, with overwhelming numerical superiority, successfully broke the defense of General Mikhail Fostikov's brigade, which was defending the Kuban peninsula, numbering only 1,500 bayonets with 12 artillery cannons. The Red Army soldiers captured the Lithuanian Peninsula and began to move to the rear of the White positions at Perekop.

=== Assault on the Turkish Wall ===
At the same time, the 51st Rifle Division (4 brigades of 3 regiments each - more than 30,000 soldiers) launched a frontal attack on the Turkish Wall. In order to concentrate the attacking forces, the division was reorganized into six waves: the first was made up of grenade launchers and wire cutters, the second - attack aircraft; the third was a reserve; the fourth - "cleaners", and the fifth and sixth - the reserve. The attack was not successful. The Red shock fire brigade attacked, according to some reports, in red shirts, and during the assault they lost half of their men.

The Turkish Wall was occupied only by two Kornilov shock regiments (1000 bayonets), and the third regiment stood with the front to the east, to Syvash, to guard against a flanking maneuver. The Kornilov division had just entered this line of defense, having replaced 2AK units. Being under artillery fire behind the crest of the rampart, which saved the personnel from losses, at the beginning of the attack, the Kornilovites returned to the trenches and shot the attacking enemy from point-blank with machine guns. The Red Army soldiers were only able to reach the ditch braided with barbed wire in front of the rampart and lay down "under the destructive machine-gun and artillery fire", having suffered losses of more than 50%. As Soviet historians, such as Vladimir Triandafillov, later admitted, the attack on the Turkish Wall that day ended in complete failure.

On the other side of the trenches, during the battle on 8 November 1920, the 2nd Kornilov shock regiment, for example, saw 8 people killed and 40 wounded. 35 horses were killed. All wounds were from artillery fire.

On the morning of 8 November, units of the red landing launched an offensive from the Chukhonsky Peninsula to the town of Armyansk, in the rear of the defense of the Turkish Wall. But they could not advance further to Perekop due to a lack of cavalry. The Makhnovist detachment under Ataman Semen Karetnyk and units of the 7th Cavalry Division were sent to rescue the landing party.

The Drozdov division from Armyansk and the Markov division from Yushun counterattacked, trying to isolate and defeat the red landing, but to no avail. The red units initially retreated, but, having overwhelming superiority, again continued their offensive in the rear of the Perekop positions.

On 9 November 1920, under the threat of encirclement, the Kornilov Shock Division left the Turkish Wall by one in the morning and retreated to their positions at Yushun. The night was dark and starless. In the rearguard of the division, the battalion of Colonel Troshin was left, which by one o'clock also left the Turkish Wall.

But, according to Soviet historiography, at 03:30 on 9 November 1920, with a repeated attack, simultaneously with a flanking maneuver, the 51st Rifle Division captured the positions at Perekop and continued the attack on the positions at Yushun. Other historians state that the withdrawal of the White units was only discovered by the Red units on the morning of 9 November.

=== Assault on the Yushun positions ===
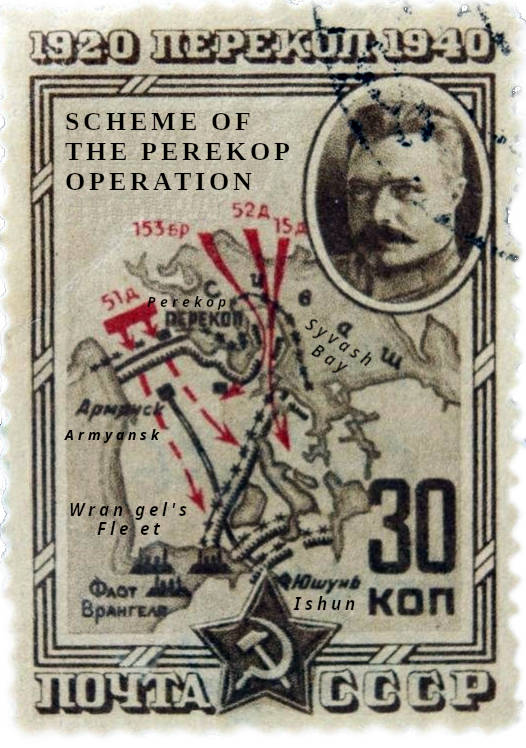
Portrait of the commander of the Southern Front Mikhail Frunze and a scheme of the Perekop operation, USSR stamp, 1940

A change in the direction of the wind caused an increase in the water level in the Syvash, which threatened cutting off the troops on the Lithuanian Peninsula from the main forces of the Red Army. However, on 9 November, the fords were restored by mobilized residents from the villages of Volodymyrivka and Stroganivka.

By 15:00 on 9 November, the red units reached the positions at Yushun. There are several lakes in this place, and therefore the fighting began in narrow defiles between them. All attacks by the Red Army that day were repulsed.

On 10 November, the 15th and 52nd divisions of the Red Army broke through the first line of defensive positions, but were counterattacked and thrown back almost to the Lithuanian Peninsula, and the numerous 51st division, reinforced by the Latvian division, held their positions. By evening, a paradoxical situation had developed, when the opponents on the left flanks mutually threatened each other with encirclement.

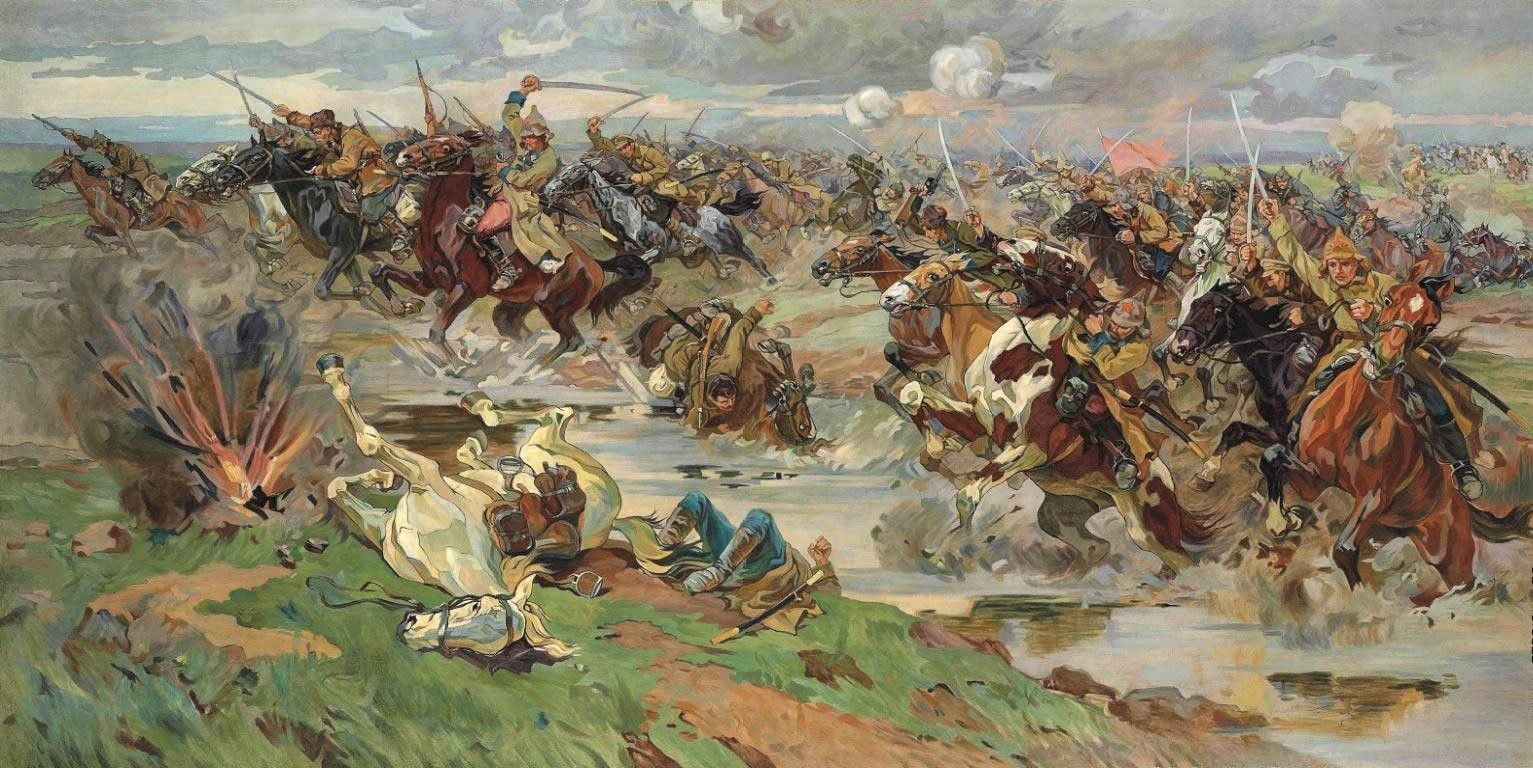
Nikolay Samokish "Red Cavalry at Perekop".

On 10-11 November 1920, in the area of Yushun and Karpova Balka, the cavalry corps of General Ivan Barbovich (4,000 sabers, 150 machine guns, 30 cannons, 5 armored cars) counterattacked the Makhnovists under the command of Semen Karetnyk and the forces of the 2nd Cavalry Army. General Wrangel had already given the order to evacuate, but the cavalry was thrown into battle so that the infantry units could retreat.

The White Cavalry managed to push back the 15th and 52nd divisions of the Reds from Yushun to the Lithuanian Peninsula, defeat the 7th and 16th cavalry divisions, threatening the rear of the troops that had broken through Perekop.

But Barbovich’s cavalry ran into the Makhnovist cavalry group, which, imitating a retreat, deployed a line of tachanki with 150 machine guns in front of the advancing White cavalry and mowed them down, forcing them to turn back. After that, the Makhnovist cavalrymen and the 2nd Cavalry Army began to cut down the retreating Whites. At the same time, on the opposite sector of the front (near the Karkinit Bay of the Black Sea), the 51st division was able to capture two lines of trenches at Yushun.

On 11 November, the attacks of the red units continued and were finally able to break through the entire line of the Yushun fortifications. The entrance to Crimea was open. On the same day, the Chongar fortifications were also broken through by the red units. The attackers of the 266th and 267th regiments of the Red Army were almost completely wiped out, but captured the area of the village of Avuz-Kirk.

=== Occupation of the cities of Crimea ===
By 12 November 1920, the Red Army had captured Yushun, forcing the white troops into a retreat. Mikhail Frunze gave his troops a day’s notice (to put their units in order) and sent a telegram to Pyotr Wrangel suggesting that he capitulate, but no answer was received. White troops hastily retreated to the ports (Yevpatoriya, Sevastopol, Yalta, Feodosiya and Kerch), where they were loaded onto ships for evacuation. Unlike the disastrous evacuations of Odessa and Novorossiysk, it was planned and carried out in a relatively organized manner.

Some generals and politicians offered to give the last battle to the Red Army, but Alexander Kutepov responded with a short answer: "Putting the army in the field is not a tricky business".

On 13 November the Red Army occupied Simferopol. By 15 November, the Red Army had also occupied Sevastopol and Feodosiya. The White Guards were able to break away from the Red Army and boarding the evacuation ships took place without shelling. When the last ships had already moved away from the moorings, suddenly one destroyer rushed back to the port - they had forgotten the battalion of the Markov regiment guarding the port. They quickly landed it, and the ship returned to the squadron. On 16 November, the Red Army occupied Kerch and, on 17 November, it occupied Yalta.

The result of the Perekop-Chongar operation was the breakthrough of the Red Army into the territory of Crimea, the evacuation of the Russian Army and part of the civilian population abroad, and the establishment of Soviet power in Crimea. The last major front of the Civil War was liquidated. Soviet historiography recognized that the victory in this operation was achieved due to the concentration of superior forces and means on the main directions of the offensive.

== In popular culture ==
- Two Comrades Were Serving - 1968 Soviet film, which takes place during the Perekop-Chongar Operation.
- The Flight - 1970 Soviet film based on the works of writer Mikhail Bulgakov. The first part of the film takes place in Crimea, defended by the White army.
- Marshal of the Revolution - 1978 Soviet biopic about the Southern Front commander Mikhail Frunze, covering the events from 21 September to 16 November 1920 (the fighting in the south of the left-bank Ukraine, assault of Perekop and forcing the Syvash, the defeat of Baron Wrangel's army in Crimea).
- The Sun of the Dead - 1923 novel by Ivan Shmelyov focusing on the consequences of the capture of Crimea by the Red Army.
- Sumy Hussars 1651–1951 (Buenos Aires, 1954), a historical overview written by White émigrés, describes the collapse of the 1st Sumy Hussar Regiment's main squadron restored in the Volunteer Army. On 13 November [O.S. 30 October] 1920, the squadron's remnants surrendered to the Bolsheviks near the village of Mamut. A part of the regiment officers committed suicide, others were shot on the spot.

== See also ==
- Bibliography of the Russian Revolution and Civil War
- Outline of the Russian Revolution and Civil War
- Index of articles related to the Russian Revolution and Civil War
- The "Russian" Civil Wars, 1916–1926: Ten Years That Shook the World
- Russia in Flames: War, Revolution, Civil War, 1914–1921
- Russia in Revolution: An Empire in Crisis, 1890 to 1928
- Russia: Revolution and Civil War, 1917—1921
- The Russian Revolution: A New History

== Bibliography ==
- Darch, Colin (2020). Nestor Makhno and Rural Anarchism in Ukraine, 1917-1921. London: Pluto Press. pp. 108–127. ISBN 9781786805263. OCLC 1225942343.
- Golubev, Aleksandr Vasilevich (1933). Перекоп и Чонгар: Сборник статей и материалов (in Russian). Moscow: State Military Publishing House. p. 80. OCLC 749031259.
- Kenez, Peter (2004). Red Advance, White Defeat. Civil War in South Russia 1919-1920. Washington DC: New Academia Publishing. pp. 306–307. ISBN 0974493457.
- Khromov, Simon, ed. (1987). "Перекопско-Чонгарская операция 1920" [Perekop-Chongar operation 1920]. Гражданская война и военная интервенция в СССР (in Russian) (2nd ed.). Moscow: Советская энциклопедия. pp. 454–456. OCLC 16977277.
- Malet, Michael (1982). Nestor Makhno in the Russian Civil War. London: Palgrave Macmillan. pp. 64–80. ISBN 978-0-333-25969-6. OCLC 8514426.
- Okgarkov, N.V., ed. (1978). "Перекопско-Чонгарская операция 1920" [Perekop-Chongar operation 1920]. Soviet Military Encyclopedia (in Russian). Vol. 6. Moscow: Воениздат. pp. 286–287. OCLC 609213504.
- Savchenko, Viktor (2016). Дванадцять війн за Україну (in Ukrainian). Kyiv: Nora-Druk. ISBN 9789668659874. OCLC 978705919.
- Shambarov, Valeriĭ (2002). Белогвардейщина (in Russian). Moscow: ĖKSMO-Press. ISBN 5-04-009519-8. OCLC 49748379.
- Shefov, Nikolai (2006). "Перекопско-Чонгарская операция". Битвы России (in Russian). Moscow: ACT. pp. 412–413. ISBN 5-17-010649-1. OCLC 858733219.
- Skirda, Alexandre (2004) [1982]. Nestor Makhno–Anarchy's Cossack: The Struggle for Free Soviets in the Ukraine 1917–1921. Translated by Sharkey, Paul. Oakland: AK Press. pp. 223–247. ISBN 978-1-902593-68-5. OCLC 60602979.
- Smele, J. D. (2015). The "Russian" Civil Wars 1916-1926. Ten Years That Shook the World. London: C. Hurst & Co. pp. 169–171. ISBN 9781849047210.
- Vvedensky, Boris, ed. (1955). "Перекопско-Чонгарская операция 1920" [Perekop-Chongar operation 1920]. Great Soviet Encyclopedia (in Russian). Vol. 32 (2nd ed.). Moscow: State Scientific Publishing House. pp. 416–418. OCLC 403823927.
