= Soviet anarchism =

Anarchist tendency during the Russian Revolution

Soviet anarchism was a tendency of anarchism in Russia that supported the Russian Soviet Republic in the wake of the October Revolution. It largely consisted of anarcho-syndicalists and anarchist-communists who supported collaboration with the new state, with some taking government posts or serving in the Red Army. The Soviet anarchists believed that the Bolsheviks constituted a lesser evil than the White movement, and that cooperation with them was necessary to defeat what they considered reactionary forces. Some considered the dictatorship of the proletariat to be a temporary necessity in a transition towards anarchy and communism. With the end of the civil war, the Bolshevik government suppressed the Russian anarchist movement, including the Soviet anarchists. Some were imprisoned and exiled, while others withdrew from political life. Surviving Soviet anarchists who remained in the Soviet Union disappeared during the Great Purge.

== Background ==
Following the outbreak of the Russian Civil War, many Russian anarchists found themselves siding with the Bolsheviks, who they saw as a lesser evil when compared to the "reactionary" White movement. Others worried that support for or even neutrality towards the Bolsheviks would strengthen them too much. The anarchist movement soon split into collaborationists, neutralists and anti-Bolsheviks. Most anarcho-syndicalists and anarchist communists ended up supporting the government, although a militant minority maintained their opposition to the government and even carried out terrorist attacks against it. The militant anti-Bolsheviks referred to anarchist collaborators, particularly the anarcho-syndicalists, as "Soviet anarchists". Some of these Soviet anarchists sought to build Soviet power and ensure its success, while others attempted to influence the Soviets towards decentralisation and federalism.

== Collaboration ==
=== Military collaboration ===
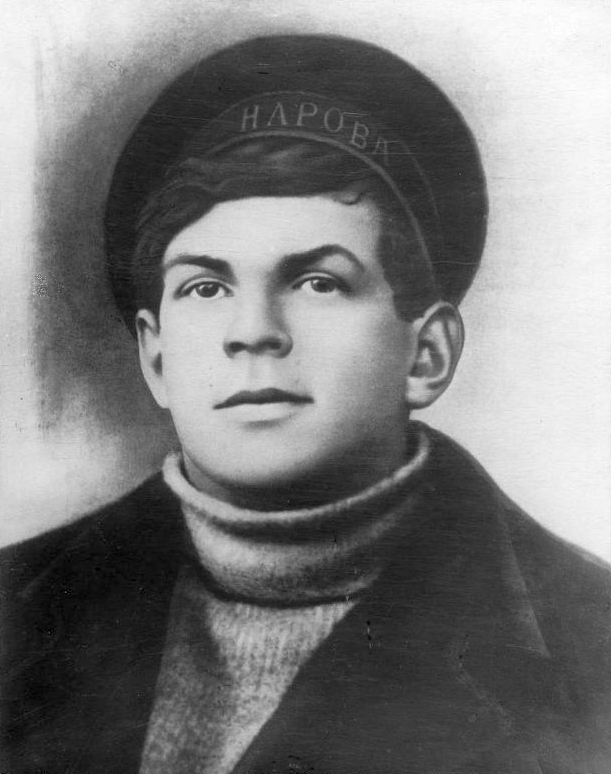
Anatoli Zhelezniakov, a Soviet anarchist who was killed in action while fighting in the Red Army

Soviet anarchists enlisted in the Red Army and the Cheka to fight against the Whites and suppress reactionary forces. In 1919, Aleksandr Ge, Anatoli Zhelezniakov and Iustin Zhuk were all killed in action by Anton Denikin's Volunteer Army while fighting on the southern front. Bill Shatov, who had served on the Military Revolutionary Committee during the October Revolution, fought in the Battle of Petrograd as an officer in the 10th Red Army.

=== Organisational collaboration ===
In the spring of 1918, Apollon Karelin established the All-Russian Federation of Anarchist-Communists, with which he intended to organise anarchist collaboration with the government. In its journal Volnaia Zhizn, the organisation argued that Soviet anarchists were fighting in defense of the revolution, not state authority. Later that year, Karelin was elected to the All-Russian Central Executive Committee, where he served alongside Aleksandr Ge. The anarchists on the committee attempted to oppose the use of the death penalty and state terrorism, but they were relegated to non-voting observer status. A second Soviet anarchist group, known as the Universalists, was also established by German Askarov and Abba and Wolf Gordin. In August 1919, Lenin commented that the Soviet anarchists had fast become "the most dedicated supporters of Soviet power".

=== Political collaboration ===
Soviet anarchists of various tendencies joined the Communist Party and took government posts in the nascent Council of People's Commissars. Among the anarcho-syndicalists, Alexander Schapiro and German Sandomirskii worked for the People's Commisariat of Foreign Affairs, Volin for the education department and Daniil Novomirskii for the Communist International. Among the anarchist-communists, Vladimir Zabrezhnev ran the state propaganda organ Izvestia and Nikolai Rogdaev headed the agitprop department in Turkestan. Even the individualist anarchist Alexei Borovoi worked in the People's Commisariat of Health. Maksim Rayevsky also secured a civil service job through his connections with Leon Trotsky and Jan Wacław Machajski worked as an editor of the Economic Council's official organ. After the formation of the Far Eastern Republic in 1920, Bill Shatov was appointed as the nascent state's minister of transport.

=== Ideological justifications ===
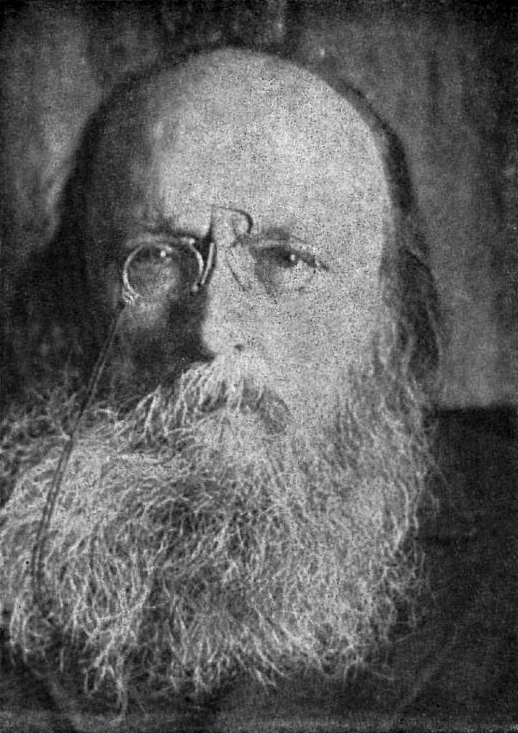
Apollon Karelin, a Soviet anarchist who served in the All-Russian Central Executive Committee and supported a dictatorship of the proletariat

When Bill Shatov met with Alexander Berkman and Emma Goldman in 1920, he admitted that the Soviet Republic had become the highly centralised and unfree society the anarchists had predicted it would. He nevertheless insisted that anarchists "could not fight with ideals alone", and that rather than criticising the government, they should instead focus on defeating the Whites and building socialism. Jan Wacław Machajski, who had initially opposed the October Revolution and called for the overthrow of the Soviet government, rolled back his earlier pronouncements, worrying that overthrowing the government would benefit the Whites.

Iuda Grossman, a former insurrectionary anarchist of the Black Banner terrorist group, converted fully to Soviet anarchism. He publicly praised Vladimir Lenin and attempted to formulate an anarchist theory about the dictatorship of the proletariat. Grossman declared that it was every anarchist's duty to collaborate with the Bolsheviks and called on them to put aside their theoretical disagreements for the sake of expediency, so they could all help rebuild Russia.

Apollon Karelin and the Universalists both argued that a dictatorship was necessary to suppress reactionary forces, and believed it constituted a temporary transitional stage that would lead towards anarchy and communism. Daniil Novomirskii believed that any anarchist that genuinely stood for social revolution would inevitably end up joining the Communist Party.

== Repression ==
By 1920, the White Army was being driven back on all fronts; the Red forces had won with the support of the Soviet anarchists. Nevertheless, the Russian Revolution ended with the Bolsheviks having deprived the anarchists of their last popular support among the working classes and intelligentsia. Over the subsequent years, particularly following the suppression of the Kronstadt rebellion, the Bolshevik government cracked down on the organised anarchist movement, even imprisoning loyal Soviet anarchists such as Iuda Grossman, the Universalist Gordin brothers and the Karelinite Aleksei Solonovich. In November 1921, the Cheka raided the Universalist headquarters and arrested German Askarov. The group was subsequently replaced by the Anarcho-Biocosmists, which declared its unconditional loyalty to the Soviet government and pledged not to carry out a social revolution on Soviet territory. When Soviet anarchists were released from prison years later, they were kept under police surveillance.

In the mid-1920s, the Gordin brothers fled the country and emigrated to the United States. Abba Gordin came to conclude that any form of rulership inevitably resulted in an abuse of power. Many in the older generation also began to die out, including Vladimir Zabrezhnev, Jan Wacław Machajski and Apollon Karelin, the latter of whom lived to see his Soviet anarchist organisation suppressed by the state. Some Soviet anarchists, including Daniil Novomirskii and German Sandomirskii, became disillusioned with the government during the years of the New Economic Policy and resigned from the Communist Party to focus on academic pursuits. Novomirskii, Sandomirskii, Bill Shatov were all disappeared during the Great Purge, as were Efim Yarchuk and Peter Arshinov, who had later in life converted to Bolshevism.

During the Stalin era, Soviet historiography largely ignored the history of anarchism in Russia. But starting in the 1960s, increasingly liberal Soviet historians began to express a renewed interest in anarchism and gave particular praise to the Soviet anarchists for aiding the Bolsheviks during the civil war.

== Bibliography ==
- Avrich, Paul (1971) [1967]. The Russian Anarchists. Princeton: Princeton University Press. ISBN 0-691-00766-7. OCLC 1154930946.
- Gooderham, P. (1981). The Anarchist Movement In Russia, 1905-1917 (PDF) (PhD thesis). University of Bristol.
- Nalimov, V. V. (2001). "On the History of Mystical Anarchism in Russia". International Journal of Transpersonal Studies. 20. Translated by Yarkho, A. V.: 85–98. doi:10.24972/ijts.2001.20.1.85.
- Zimmer, Kenyon (2009). "Premature Anti-Communists?: American Anarchism, the Russian Revolution, and Left-Wing Libertarian Anti-Communism, 1917-1939". Labor: Studies in Working-Class History of the Americas. 6 (2): 45–71. doi:10.1215/15476715-2008-058.
