= German Askarov =

Polish-Jewish anarchist communist (1882–1935)

- Герман Аскаров
- Born: Herman Iakobson; 24 June 1882; Łódź, Piotrków, Poland, Russian Empire
- Disappeared: 17 March 1935 (aged 52); Soviet Union
- Occupation: Editor
- Years active: 1902–1935
- Political party: Universalists (1920–1921)
- Other political affiliations: Moscow Federation of Anarchist Groups (1917–1919)
- Movement: Anarchist communism
- Criminal charges: Anti-Soviet agitation

German Karlovich Askarov (1882–1935) was a Polish–Jewish anarchist communist. First exposed to anarchist communist ideas during his studies in Ukraine, he was arrested and imprisoned for his activism during the Russian Revolution of 1905. He then spent some years editing newspapers in exile in France, where he adopted an anti-syndicalist position. He moved to Moscow following the February Revolution of 1917 and joined the Moscow Federation of Anarchist Groups, editing its newspaper Anarkhiia before its suppression by the Bolsheviks.

As the Russian Civil War progress, Askarov grew increasingly sympathetic towards the Bolsheviks and became a leading figure of Soviet anarchism, founding the organisation of Universalists in 1920. He was arrested and imprisoned again in the wake of the Kronstadt rebellion but was released in 1924 and permitted limited room to carry out peaceful anarchist activism. Following Joseph Stalin's rise to power, Askarov was again arrested for anti-Soviet agitation and disappeared in the Gulag during the Great Purge.

== Biography ==
=== Early life ===
Askarov was born Herman Iakobson (Yiddish: הערמאן יאקובסאָן) into a Polish-Jewish family on 24 June 1882, in Łódź. He graduated from school in the Ukrainian city of Nizhyn in 1902. By this time, he was already an anarchist communist and established an anarchist group in the city the following year. By the outbreak of the 1905 Revolution, he had enrolled in Kyiv University and joined the South Russian Group of Anarchist-Communists, for which he distributed propaganda amongst his fellow students. After serving a prison sentence for his activities, he went into exile, first in Geneva, then in Paris.

=== Exile ===
In 1907, he established the Paris-based émigré magazine Anarkhist, which he edited, under the pseudonym "Oskar Burrit". In the pages of the magazine, he penned a series of articles that were fiercely critical of syndicalism, although he took a more moderate approach than many of his fellow anarchist communists. He at first distinguished between English and German reformist trade unions (Russian: профсоюзы, romanized: profsoiuzy), which he felt were trying to reconcile the forces of labour and capital; and the French revolutionary syndicates (Russian: синдикаты, romanized: sindikaty), which remained loyal to the goal of overcoming both the state and private property. But he also cautioned the syndicates from repeating the mistakes of the International Workingmen's Association (IWA) and upholding a form of authoritarian centralism, which he felt would open their ranks to politicians and union officials, diluting their anarchist character. He encouraged anarcho-syndicalists to ostracise Marxist politicians and instead draw their membership entirely from the working class, proposing the formation of underground unions that would "declare an unrelenting war against authority, always and everywhere." By 1909, Anarkhist was forced to cease publication due to a lack of funds, although Askarov continued to collaborated on other emigrant anarchist periodicals and co-edited an anti-militarist newspaper together with Errico Malatesta and Ferdinand Domela Nieuwenhuis.

=== Revolutionary activities ===
Following the February Revolution of 1917, Askarov moved to Moscow, where the Moscow Federation of Anarchist Groups had occupied the Merchants' House and renamed it the "House of Anarchy". Although open to syndicalists and individualists, the Federation's membership consisted primarily of anarchist communists, with Askarov himself being brought on as editor of the organisation's newspaper Anarkhiia. After the October Revolution and the ratification of the Treaty of Brest-Litovsk, Russian anarchists quickly became dissilusioned with the government of Vladimir Lenin and the Moscow Federation began establishing armed units known as the Black Guards. When the Guards began carrying out unilateral expropriations, Anarkhiia repudiated such actions and declared the prohibition of unilateral action by Black Guardsmen. But this had already proved too much for the Bolshevik government, which launched a raid on the House of Anarchy, shutting down Anarkhiia and suppressing the Moscow Federation after a battle with the Black Guards.

In early 1919, Askarov and fellow anarchist communists Iosif Bleikhman and Vladimir Barmash attempted to heal the rift between them and the syndicalists, coming together with them to form the "Moscow Union of Anarcho-Syndicalists-Communists". From its magazine Trud i Volia, the nascent Moscow Union launched a polemic against the Bolshevik government and appealed for direct action against the authoritarian and bureuacratic state system. By May 1919, the group was suppressed and its magazine shut down after publishing its sixth issue.

=== Soviet anarchism ===
As the Russian Civil War progressed, many anarchist communists came to fear the prospect of a victory by the White Army and a debate broke out over whether to support the Bolshevik government; those who believed they should became known as Soviet anarchists. While a minority of more militant anarchist communists maintained their hostility to the Bolsheviks, the majority resolved to support or even join the Communist Party. Prominent anarchist communists such as Apollon Karelin and Askarov himself were brought around to this position, even becoming members of the All-Russian Central Executive Committee. Together with Abba and Wolf Gordin, Askarov formed the Universalists. As editor of the organisation's periodical Universal, he advocated for supporting the Red Army and ending any hostilities with the government, maintaining that a temporary dictatorship of the proletariat was a necessary step in the transition towards a stateless society.

Nevertheless, following the outbreak of the Kronstadt rebellion, many of the Soviet anarchists found themselves supporting the uprising and denouncing the government's repression of it. Another wave of political repression was subsequently unleashed against the anarchists. In November 1921, the Universalists were raided and their newspaper was shut down. Despite being a member of the Moscow Soviet, Askarov was arrested and charged with anti-Soviet agitation. On 21 January 1922, he was imprisoned in a labour camp in Arkhangelsk, where a week later he participated in a two-week long hunger strike, followed by another week-long hunger strike a month later. Following a successful petition, in April 1922, he was transferred back to Moscow, where his case was re-examined and many of the charges dropped, replacing his sentence with exile to Vyatka for 2 years.

Following the end of the civil war, many of the Soviet anarchists were released from their sentences, while being kept under police surveillance, with some peaceful anarchist activity being given room to operate during the period of the New Economic Policy. On 5 January 1924, Askarov was released and he returned to Moscow, where he participated in various cultural-educational associations, including the work of the Kropotkin Museum. In 1927, he was permitted by the Moscow Soviet to organise a public protest against the American government's execution of Sacco and Vanzetti.

=== Repression and disappearance ===
After Joseph Stalin's rise to power and the implementation of totalitarianism in the Soviet Union, the Soviet anarchists were once again politically repressed. Askarov quickly found himself unemployed and, on 14 September 1930, he was arrested once again. He attempted to prove his innocence of anti-Soviet activities and reaffirmed his support for the government, declaring it impossible for him to work within the anarchist movement as it was incompatible with the work of the Communist Party. He was released two days later and, on 13 January 1931, the Joint State Political Directorate (OGPU) terminated its case against him. In 1932, he returned to editorial work at the magazine Inostrannaya Kniga and later worked as an economist at the Tsentrozhilsoyuz.

On 13 January 1935, Askarov and other Muscovite anarchists were arrested en masse, on charges of anti-Soviet agitation. During the investigation, the NKVD found that anarchists had continued meeting at Askarov's flat to carry out propaganda against the government, which they claimed Askarov had compared to a fascist dictatorship. On 17 March 1935, the NKVD sentenced him to 5 years in a correctional labour camp, where he disappeared from record. Askarov was one of many anarchists that disappeared in the Gulag during the Great Purge.

== Bibliography ==
- Avrich, Paul (1971) [1967]. The Russian Anarchists. Princeton: Princeton University Press. ISBN 0-691-00766-7. OCLC 1154930946.
- Dubovik, Anatoly (2007). "АСКАРОВ [настоящая фамилия Якобсон] Герман Карлович (парт. псевдонимы – Герман Клейнер, Герман лит. псевдоним – О. Буррит)" [ASKAROV [real surname Jakobson] Herman Karlovich (party pseudonyms – Herman Kleiner, Herman lit. pseudonym – O. Burritt)]. In Morozov, K. N. (ed.). Biographical Dictionary of Socialists and Anarchists (in Russian). Memorial.
