= Moscow Federation of Anarchist Groups =

Russian anarchist federation

Moscow Federation of Anarchist Groups Федерации анархических групп Москвы
- Abbreviation: MFAG
- Secretary: Lev Chernyi
- Founded: March 1917
- Dissolved: 12 April 1918
- Preceded by: Moscow Group of Anarchist-Syndicalists
- Merged into: Underground Anarchists
- Headquarters: House of Anarchy, Moscow
- Newspaper: Anarkhiia
- Armed wing: Black Guards
- Membership (1917): 70
- Ideology: Anarchism
- Political position: Far-left

The Moscow Federation of Anarchist Groups (Russian: Федерации анархических групп Москвы; MFAG) was a Russian anarchist political organisation. Established in Moscow in the wake of the February Revolution of 1917, it dedicated itself to distributing anarchist propaganda to the city's workers and soon became the second largest political force in the Russian capital. After the Bolsheviks seized power in the October Revolution and signed the Treaty of Brest-Litovsk, the Federation established armed detachments of Black Guards, which raised tensions with the Bolshevik government. In April 1918, the organisation was suppressed in a mass raid by the Cheka. It remained active as a clandestine organisation, before joining the Underground Anarchists in 1919.

== Establishment ==
In February 1917, strike actions and food riots in the Russian Empire had escalated into revolution, which deposed the Tsarist autocracy and established a liberal provisional government. The Russian anarchist movement, which had been driven underground or into exile following the repression of the 1905 Revolution, experienced a rapid revival. The provisional government extended an amnesty to political opponents of the old regime, releasing hundreds of anarchists from prison and allowing many exiled anarchists to return home. Many anarchists who had been organising clandestinely, including the Moscow Group of Anarchist-Syndicalists (MSAG), came out of hiding and were able to carry out their activism legally. Anarchist organisations were quickly established throughout the major cities of Russia and gained support from sections of the industrial working class. In Moscow, anarchists established trade unions to organise workers in the city's food, printing, railroad and tanning industries. Some of these groups, representing 70 members, came together in March 1917 to establish the Moscow Federation of Anarchist Groups (MFAG). It occupied the Merchants' House, which it renamed the "House of Anarchy" and established as its headquarters.

== Membership and initial activities ==
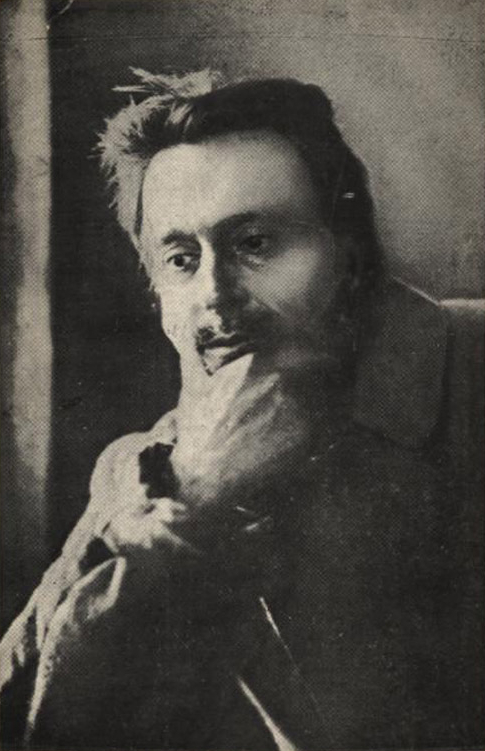
Lev Chernyi, the secretary of the Moscow Federation of Anarchist Groups

Members of the Moscow Federation were mostly communist anarchists, although it also hosted a minority of individualist and syndicalist anarchists. The individualist anarchist poet Lev Chernyi served as the organisation's secretary and the communist anarchist polemicist German Askarov worked as editor-in-chief of its newspaper Anarkhiia (Russian: Анархия; English: Anarchy), which began publication on 13 September 1917 and ran weekly until November 1917. Its other leading figures included: Vladimir Barmash, a veteran of the 1905 Revolution; Alexei Borovoi, a philosophy professor; and Apollon Karelin and the brothers Abba and Wolf Gordin, who were all labour organisers. New members were admitted to individual groups by recommendation from existing members, according to the principles of voluntary association. The Ukrainian anarchist revolutionary Nestor Makhno, who met members of the Moscow Federation in June 1918, described them as "men of books rather than deeds", more concerned with speechmaking and penning resolutions than carrying out direct action.

The Moscow Federation focused its efforts mainly on distributing anarchist propaganda in the city's working class districts, such as Lefortovo, Presnya and Sokolniki. They rejected involvement in any illegal activities, with the exception of seizing private homes from the wealthy. When the Russian capital was moved from Petrograd to Moscow, the latter supplanted the former as the centre of the Russian anarchist movement. During this time, Latvian communist Jēkabs Peterss depicted the anarchists as having constituted a "second political power" in the Russian capital. The Moscow Federation of Anarchist Groups became the principal Russian anarchist organisation, and referred to itself as the "avant-garde of the revolutionary proletariat".

== Conflict with the Bolsheviks ==
Following the October Revolution, the Bolsheviks had established the council of People's Commissars as the new Russian government, creating what many Russian anarchists denounced as a dictatorship. On 3 March 1918, the Bolshevik government signed the Treaty of Brest-Litovsk, which ceded a substantial amount of Russia's land and industrial capacity to the German Empire, which exacerbated tensions between the Bolsheviks and the anarchists. The Moscow Federation relaunched its newspaper, Anarkhiia, within which it declared itself opposed to "all forms of the state (including the socialist state)" and called for an "armed uprising" against all economic exploitation and political repression. To prepare for guerrilla warfare against the Germans and to defend themselves from government repression, the Moscow Federation established armed combat groups which they called the "Black Guards".

Despite attempted to impose limits and discipline on the Black Guards, the Moscow Federation quickly lost control of its armed detachments, which began carrying out unsanctioned "expropriations". In its newspaper Anarkhiia, the Federation condemned the actions of the Black Guards and vowed to "combat such manifestations of the bourgeois spirit". The Federation subsequently issued an order that required three members of staff to sign off on a mission. Nevertheless, by this time, the Bolsheviks decided to act to suppress the armed anarchist formations. On 12 April, the Cheka carried out a series of raids against the anarchist centres in Moscow. The Black Guards attempted to resist, leading to an armed confrontation at the House of Anarchy. 12 Chekists and 40 anarchists were killed during the battle, which ended with the House being raided and over 500 anarchists being arrested. The government also shut down the Federation's newspaper Anarkhiia, which ceased publicaation on 2 July 1918. When the anarcho-Bolshevik Aleksandr Ge protested the raids to the All-Russian Central Executive Committee, the Bolshevik members claimed the raids were only targeting criminals, not "ideological anarchists".

The factional violence in Moscow came to a head in August 1918, when the socialist-revolutionary Fanya Kaplan attempted to assassinate the Bolshevik leader Vladimir Lenin. According to Victor Serge, surviving Black Guards briefly considered seizing the city in an armed offensive, but were discouraged by Alexei Borovoi. Lev Chernyi also reorganised the Moscow Federation of Anarchist Groups into a clandestine organisation, which merged into the Underground Anarchists, and participated in the bombing of the Russian Communist Party's headquarters in September 1919. Around this time, political repression against the anarchist movement broadened, from targeting the Black Guards to cracking down on the anarchist press, trade unions and political organisations. As the repression against the anarchist movement in Moscow intensified, many anarchists fled to Ukraine and joined the Nabat Confederation of Anarchist Organisations. Peter Arshinov, a former member of the Moscow Federation, moved to Katerynoslav and organised local factory workers.

== Bibliography ==
- Avrich, Paul (1971) [1967]. The Russian Anarchists. Princeton: Princeton University Press. ISBN 0-691-00766-7. OCLC 1154930946.
- Gurianova, Nina (2013). "Revolution Is Creativity: Some Aspects of Moscow Anarchist Periodicals in the Context of Avant-Garde Aesthetics (1917–1918)". The Journal of Modern Periodical Studies. 4 (2): 245–269. doi:10.5325/jmodeperistud.4.2.0245.
