= Lev Chernyi =

Russian individualist anarchist (1878–1921)

- Лев Чёрный
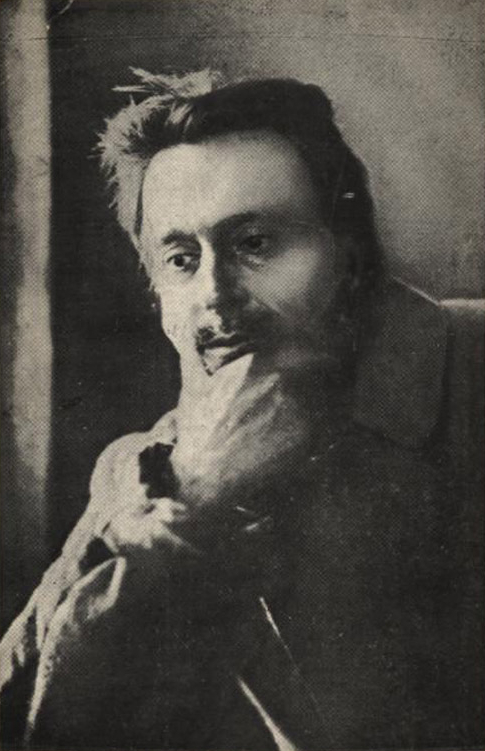
- Chernyi, c. 1921
- Born: Pavel Dmitrievich Turchaninov; 28 February [O.S. 16 February] 1878; Smolensk, Russian Empire
- Died: 21 September 1921 (aged 43); Moscow, Russian Soviet Republic
- Cause of death: Execution by shooting
- Education: Moscow University
- Occupation: Writer
- Notable work: Associational Anarchism
- Political party: Moscow Federation of Anarchist Groups
- Movement: Individualist anarchism
- Criminal charges: Counterfeiting
- Criminal penalty: Capital punishment
- Partner: Nina Yagodina
- Relatives: Sergey Turchaninov (brother)

Pavel Dmitrievich Turchaninov (Russian: Па́вел Дми́триевич Турчани́нов, IPA: [ˈpavʲɪl ˈdmʲitrʲɪjɪvʲɪtɕ tʊrtɕɪˈnʲinəf]; 1878–1921), commonly known by his pseudonym Lev Chernyi (Russian: Лев Чёрный, IPA: [ˈlʲef ˈtɕɵrnɨj]), was a Russian individualist anarchist. Having joined the anarchist movement during the Russian Revolution of 1905, during which he developed his individualist theory of "associational anarchism", Chernyi was arrested and exiled to Siberia for his revolutionary activities. After several escape attempts, one of which resulted in mutinous exiles capturing Turukhansk, he managed to flee to Paris, where he stayed until the Russian Revolution of 1917. After returning to Russia, he acted as secretary for the Moscow Federation of Anarchist Groups and organised the Black Guards, the federation's armed wing. As political repression against anarchists intensified after the Bolsheviks took power, Chernyi joined an underground anarchist group, which bombed a Russian Communist Party meeting. In 1921, Chernyi and Fanya Baron were arrested on charges of counterfeiting and were executed by shooting by the Cheka.

== Biography ==
Pavel Dmitrievich Turchaninov was born to noble family in the Smolensk Governorate of the Russian Empire, on 28 February [O.S. 16 February] 1878. His father, Dmitry Turchaninov, was a colonel in the Imperial Russian Army.

=== Revolutionary activities ===
After coming of age, Turchaninov enrolled in Moscow University but he was expelled in 1901 for his activity in revolutionary groups. By the outbreak of the Russian Revolution of 1905, he had joined the anarchist movement.

Under the pseudonym Lev Chernyi, he wrote a manifesto of his newfound anarchist beliefs, Associational Anarchism, which he finished in February 1906. Chernyi's brother Sergey Turchaninov, himself a Marxist and empirio-criticist, criticised his brother's work for utopianism and a lack of basis in materialism. In its own "Review of the Revolutionary Movement", the Ministry of Internal Affairs described Chernyi's book as a "paraphrasing" of the work of Pierre-Joseph Proudhon. Researcher Allan Antliff himself compared it to Max Stirner's book The Ego and Its Own.

From 1906 to 1908, Chernyi was a member of the Buntar group, through which he began a relationship with Nina Yagodina. In April 1908, he was exiled to the Yeniseysk Governorate in Siberia, while Yagodina was exiled Arkhangelsk Governorate in the Russian North. Turchaninov frequently attempted escaped from exile, aiming to reunite with Yagodina.

=== Exile ===
In the autumn of 1908, he and a group of exiled revolutionaries made a plan to escape Siberia by hijacking a steamship. On 8 December 1908, the group ambushed a convoy at Osinovo and headed north along the Yenisey, despite Chernyi's objections to the choice of route. On 2 January 1909 [O.S. 20 December 1908], they captured Turukhansk, where they led an armed uprising against the Tsarist authorities. Although he had himself refused to participate in the revolt, he was arrested on 16 February [O.S. 3 February] 1909; two days later, the rebels were disarmed by the Imperial Russian Army. By this time, the authorities had identified Turchaninov as the writer Lev Chernyi. Despite his lack of direct involvement in the Turukhansk uprising, the Ministry of Internal Affairs held him responsible for organising the mutiny.

After this setback, he again made a last attempt to escape Siberia; this one was successful. Chernyi moved to Paris, where he lived until the outbreak of the Russian Revolution of 1917. Details about Chernyi's Siberian exile were only revealed after the opening of the State Archive of the Russian Federation and the State Archive of Krasnoyarsk Krai, which contributed to a more complete biographical picture of his life.

=== Return to Moscow ===
After the February Revolution, Chernyi returned to Moscow, where he joined the Moscow Federation of Anarchist Groups, serving as the organisation's secretary. Although the Federation largely opposed illegalist and expropriative activities, Chernyi himself advocated for the organization to seize private homes. Following the outbreak of the Russian Civil War, Chernyi helped organise the Black Guards, the armed wing of the Moscow Federation of Anarchist Groups. On 5 March 1918, the second issue of Anarkhiia after the October Revolution, Chernyi published an article in which he denounced the new Russian Soviet Republic and declared it to be as much of a threat as the old regime. In subsequent issues of the paper, Chernyi outlined proposals for the decentralisation of industry and the abolition of hierarchical power.

By the summer of 1918, political repression against the anarchist movement drove many of Moscow's anarchists underground; Chernyi himself facilitated the creation of an underground group of the Federation. Chernyi appeared to the Ukrainian anarchist Nestor Makhno, who visited Moscow in June 1918, to have been collaborating with the Soviet regime. In 1919, he joined the Underground Anarchists, founded by Kazimir Kovalevich and Pyotr Sobalev. On 25 September 1919, the Underground Anarchists carried out a bombing of a Russian Communist Party meeting, killing 12 functionaries and wounding 55 others, including Nikolai Bukharin, Yemelyan Yaroslavsky and Yuri Steklov. The bombing ultimately resulted in the intensification of political repression against the anarchists. Chernyi himself was not directly involved in the bombing.

=== Arrest and execution ===
During the political repression that followed the bombing, Lev Chernyi and Fanya Baron were detained on charges of counterfeiting. In September 1921, Chernyi and Baron were shot by the Cheka. Their execution drew protests from others in the Russian anarchist movement, including Emma Goldman. The public outcry led to the government of Vladimir Lenin ordering the release and immediate deportation of a number of anarchist political prisoners, while other anarchists voluntarily left the country.

== Political ideology ==
Chernyi's "associational anarchism" was a spin on individualist anarchism, based on the free association of individuals. Alongside Émile Armand, Chernyi was one of the earliest European advocates of individualist anarchism, which drew inspiration from Max Stirner's egoist philosophy. Together with Alexei Borovoi, Chernyi was a leading figure of individualist anarchism during the revolutionary period in Russia. They were both inspired by Friedrich Nietzsche's call for the overthrow of bourgeois values, as well as Max Stirner and Benjamin Tucker's opposition to society. They even rejected the anarchist communism advocated by Peter Kropotkin, as they believed it would stifle individual freedoms.

== Selected works ==
Books

- Новое направление в анархизме: Ассоциационный анархизм / A New Trend in Anarchism: Associational Anarchism (New York, 1923) [Moscow, 1907]
- О классах / About the Classes (Moscow, 1924)

Articles

- "Госуправление и анархизм" / "The State and Anarchism" (Anarkhiia, 5 March 1918)
- "Мир захлючен. Да здравствует война!" "The Peace is Concluded. Long Live War!" (Anarkhiia, 7 March 1918)

== See also ==
- Individualist anarchism in Europe
- List of anarchist poets
- Gerard Shelley

== Bibliography ==
- Antliff, Allan (2007). "Anarchy, Power, and Poststructuralism". SubStance. 36 (113): 56–66. doi:10.1353/sub.2007.0026. S2CID 146156609.
- Ashford, David (2017). Autarchies: The Invention of Selfishness. Bloomsbury Publishing. ISBN 9781474297684.
- Avrich, Paul (1971) [1967]. The Russian Anarchists. Princeton: Princeton University Press. ISBN 0-691-00766-7. OCLC 1154930946.
- Baksht, Dmitrii Alikseevich (2016). "Лев Черный (П.Д. Турчанинов) в сибирской ссылке (1907–1910 гг.): Документы органов Департамента полиции в реконструкции биографии деятеля российского анархизма" [Lev Chorny (P.D. Turchaninov) in Exile in Siberia (1907–1910): Documents of the Police Department Agencies in the Reconstruction of the Russian Anarchist’s Biography] (PDF). Herald of an Archivist (3): 300–311. ISSN 2073-0101.
- Cooke, Catherine (1999). "Alexei Gan and the Moscow Anarchists". In Leach, Neil (ed.). Architecture and Revolution. New York: Routledge. pp. 25–37. ISBN 0-415-13914-7.
- Darch, Colin (2020). Nestor Makhno and Rural Anarchism in Ukraine, 1917-1921. London: Pluto Press. ISBN 9781786805263. OCLC 1225942343.
- Polenberg, Richard (1999). Fighting Faiths: the Abrams Case, the Supreme Court and Free Speech. Ithaca: Cornell University Press. p. 350. ISBN 0-8014-8618-1.
