= Aleksandr Ge =

Russian anarchist (1879–1919)

- Александр Ге
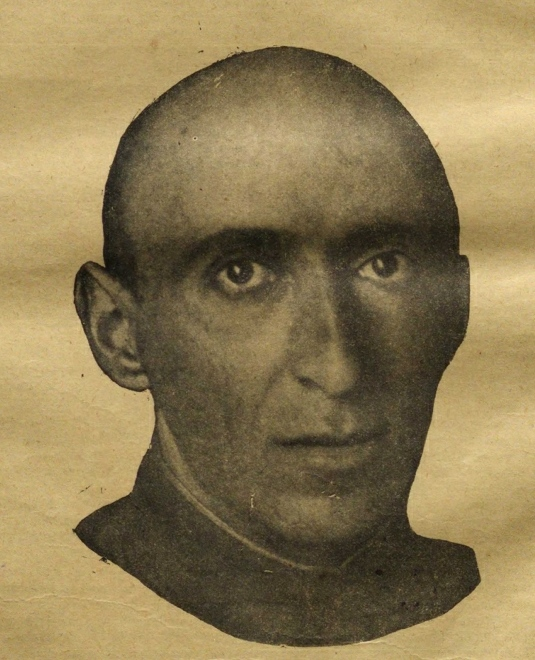
- Photo from the Blue Journal (1918)

Member of the All-Russian Central Executive Committee
- In office 31 January 1918 – 10 July 1918

Personal details
- Born: Aleksandr Yulievich Golberg; 1879 Königsberg, Prussia, German Empire
- Died: 7 January 1919 (aged 39–40) Kislovodsk, South Russia
- Cause of death: Execution
- Spouse: Ksenia Ge
- Education: Saint Petersburg State University
- Profession: Journalist

Military service
- Allegiance: Russian Soviet Republic
- Branch/service: Cheka
- Years of service: 1918–1919
- Battles/wars: Russian Civil War; Southern Front

Aleksandr Yulievich Ge (1879–1919) was a Russian anarchist politician. An activist from an early age, he became an anarchist communist during the 1905 Revolution and fled to Switzerland for his revolutionary activities. In exile, he became a vocal proponent of the internationalist position during World War I, before returning to Russia with the outbreak of the 1917 Revolution. There he was elected to the All-Russian Central Executive Committee and challenged a number of Bolshevik policies, particularly the ratification of the Treaty of Brest-Litovsk and the political repression of Russian anarchists. He then moved to the North Caucasus, where he was appointed as chairman of the local Cheka and participated in the region's defence against the White movement, for which he was eventually killed.

== Biography ==
In 1879 Aleksandr Yulievich Golberg (later known by his pseudonym "Ge") was born in Königsberg, then in the territory of the German Empire. At the age of two, Ge was brought by his family to Moscow, where he was raised. He went to school in the city's Lazarev Institute of Oriental Languages, from which he was expelled while in the 6th grade for spreading revolutionary propaganda. From 1902 he lived in Saint Petersburg and attended lectures at the local university.

=== Early political activism ===
During the 1905 Russian Revolution he became an anarcho-communist, was elected a member of the Petersburg Soviet of Workers' Deputies and spoke in factories and plants. In December 1905, he was arrested and imprisoned in Kresty Prison. In the summer of 1906, Ge contracted tuberculosis and was granted medical release. He used the opportunity to flee to Switzerland and was subsequently sentenced in Russia to five years of hard labour in absentia. While on a stagecoach going through Davos, Ge met a fellow Russian exile Ksenia Serdyukova, who later became his wife.

In exile Ge collaborated with various anarchist press organs, and made a living writing articles and essays for newspapers and magazines in Kyiv. In January 1914, he became one of the organizers of the 1st United Conference of Russian Communist Anarchists in London. Around the same time he was elected to the editorial board of the anarchist newspaper Working World (Russian: Рабочий Мир, romanized: Rabochiy Mir).

During World War I Ge led a group of communist anarchists in Switzerland with a strongly anti-war stance. He was openly critical of the Manifesto of the Sixteen, written by anarchists that supported the Allies, whom he denounced as "anarcho-patriots". For this stance, Ge was praised by Vladimir Lenin in his book The State and Revolution, in which he was described as "one of the few anarchists who have still preserved a sense of humour and a conscience."

=== Revolutionary activities ===
In 1917 Ge welcomed the October Revolution and immediately returned to Russia, where he was elected a member of the All-Russian Central Executive Committee (VTsIK). He defended a united front with the Bolsheviks, for which he penned the slogan "Go apart, fight together!" (Russian: Врозь идти, вместе бить!) For this he became known as one of the "Soviet anarchists", who were described by Vladimir Lenin as "dedicated supporters of Soviet power."

In meetings of the VTsIK, Ge opposed the Bolshevik policies of centralisation and revolutionary terror, instead putting forward the idea of the decentralisation of state administration. On a VTsIK meeting on 23 February, he sharply denounced the conditions of the Treaty of Brest-Litovsk and proclaimed "terror and partisan warfare on two fronts", declaring that: "It is better to die for the worldwide social revolution than to live as a result of an agreement with German imperialism." Despite his protests, the treaty was signed on 3 March and Ukraine was ceded to the Central Powers. At the Fourth Congress of Soviets, Ge and 13 other anarchist delegates voted against ratification, but were unable to prevent it from going forward.

By this time, anarchist detachments known as the Black Guards were already being established to wage guerrilla warfare against the German occupation of Ukraine and to carry out "expropriations" of private property. The Bolsheviks responded by carrying out a series of raids against anarchist centers in Moscow, killing dozens and taking hundreds prisoner. With anarchists beginning to accuse the Bolsheviks of being "counterrevolutionary", Ge protested the raids at a VTsIK meeting, but was assured by his colleagues that the raids were only targeting criminals, not "ideological anarchists".

At a meeting of the Central Executive Committee on 29 April 1918, Ge criticised Vladimir Lenin's report The Immediate Tasks of the Soviet Government, for which he was in turn denounced by Lenin.

=== Combat and death ===
In May 1918 Ge was dispatched to head the Kislovodsk branch of the All-Russian Extraordinary Commission (Cheka). In July, he was appointed as chairman of the Cheka in the North Caucasian Soviet Republic.

When the White forces of Andrei Shkuro attacked the North Caucasus, Ge was one of the leaders of the Extraordinary Headquarters for the defence of Pyatigorsk. On 7 January 1919, Ge was captured in Pyatigorsk and killed by the Whites, who cut him to death with sabres.

== Selected works ==
- Бакунин и Маркс. (Личные характеристики) [Bakunin and Marx. (Personal Characteristics)] (Lausanne; 1916)
- Путь к победе [The Road to Victory] (Lausanne; 1917)
- О расстрелах анархистов [On the shootings of the anarchists] (Anarkhiia, no. 43, p. 3; 1918)

== Bibliography ==
- Abramov, Vadim (2006). Евреи в КГБ [Jews in the KGB] (in Russian). Moscow: Izdatelʹ Bystrov. ISBN 5-9764-0015-9. OCLC 75970871.
- Avrich, Paul (1971) [1967]. The Russian Anarchists. Princeton: Princeton University Press. ISBN 0-691-00766-7. OCLC 1154930946.
- Usyskin, Grigori (1987). "Старший следователь ЧК" [Senior Investigator of the Cheka]. In Stishova, L.I. (ed.). Октябрём мобилизованные [October mobilised] (in Russian). Moscow: Politizdat. pp. 198–212. OCLC 25342064.
