= Universalists (Russia) =

Pan-Russian Section of the Anarchist-Universalists Всероссийская секция анархистов-универсалистов
- Abbreviation: VSAU
- Founders: Abba Gordin; Wolf Gordin; German Askarov
- Founded: August 1920
- Dissolved: 1921
- Headquarters: Moscow
- Newspaper: The Universal
- Ideology: Anarchist communism; Soviet anarchism
- Political position: Far-left

The Universalists were a Russian anarcho-communist organization established in 1920 to support the Bolsheviks during the Russian Civil War. After a period of growth, the organization split and was eventually suppressed in the wake of the Kronstadt rebellion.

== History ==
In August 1920, the brothers Abba Gordin and Wolf Gordin came together with German Askarov to found the tendency of "Anarcho-Universalism" within the Russian anarchist movement, as part of a broader trend of "Soviet anarchism", which supported the Bolsheviks. As part of their "different approach to the Soviet state", they sought to define a new course of action for the anarchist movement to take under a new socialist state, as the older anarchist methods had been defined by "a different environment, different circumstances and a different power structures". They argued that a centralized "dictatorship of the proletariat" was necessary for the transition to a stateless communist society, and advocated for Russian anarchists to collaborate with the Bolsheviks, ceasing all hostile activity in opposition to the Soviet government. Their policy was noted by Paul Avrich as being similar to that of the Maximalists, a radical faction of the Socialist Revolutionaries, which split off and later joined the Russian Communist Party (Bolsheviks).

In articles published in the organization's official organ The Universal, Askarov criticised the recent history of the Russian anarchist movement and called for anarchists to participate in the construction of a new society, claiming that the Soviet state was a matter of fact. On the re-organization of the anarchist movement, the Universalists stressed the necessity of creating a "single, coherent organization, bound by firm self-discipline and which places itself on a defined revolutionary platform" and criticized the individualist anarchist model of small disorganized affinity groups.

At their first Conference, the Universalists marked their transition "from anarchist Blanquism to the class struggle" and called for the anarchist participation in the soviets, where a number of Universalists including Askarov had already been elected. (Note: Abba Gordin had been elected twice by munitions workers to the Moscow Soviet; each time, the election results were declared invalid by the Bolsheviks.) The Universalists declared themselves in support of the Communist International and their willingness to form a united front with other political parties that supported the October Revolution. The organization began to grow rapidly, establishing branches in Bryansk, the Urals, Ryazan, Minsk, and Samara, while in their headquarters of Moscow they opened up a number of establishments including a conference hall, bookstore, restaurant, and a number of clubs. The organization was quickly joined by a number of new members that had a different anarchist political philosophy to that of its founders, which split the Universalists, leading to a minority faction around the Gordins being expelled from the organization, going onto name themselves the Anarchist-Universalist Association (inter-individualist) (Russian: Организация анархистов-универсалистов (интериндивидуалистов)) and publish the journal Through Socialism to Anarchism-Universalism. The two groups subsequently began to attack each other, with "insults, defamation, and violence".

With the Bolshevik victory over the White movement during the Russian Civil War, the Universalists were in good standing with the Bolsheviks; by the time the Kronstadt rebellion broke out, they were supporting the Baltic Fleet mutineers, denouncing the suppression of the rebellion by the Red Army under Leon Trotsky. When the New Economic Policy was implemented, Askarov responded by calling Universalists to prepare "the unions for the taking over of industry, the unionizing of the workers of the land, and economic reorganization through the free cooperation of workers and peasants."

A wave of repression against the anarchist movement soon followed, with the Universalist organizations being broken up by the Cheka, and replaced by the more obedient "Anarcho-Biocosmists", which pledged not to launch a social revolution on "Soviet territory" but instead in "interplanetary space". The Biocosmists, previously a minority within the Universalist organization, resolved to establish a new ideology that they felt could better respond to the conditions the Russian anarchist movement found itself in. In the wake of Joseph Stalin's rise to power, a number of Universalists were let out of prison under police surveillance, and Askarov was later arrested on charges of anti-Soviet agitation before disappearing during the Great Purge. In the late 1920s, Abba Gordin emigrated to the United States, while Wolf Gordin, who had by this time fully converted to Bolshevism, was subjected to punitive psychiatry before being able to escape to the United States.

== Legacy ==
The anarchist Alexander Berkman considered the Universalists to be "worse than crazy". The anarchist-turned-Bolshevik Victor Serge later praised the Universalists for condemning "the past errors of the Russian anarchist movement", advocating "participation in the Soviets", recognizing "what the revolution owes the Red Army", not wanting "to demonstrate any hostility toward the Communist International", and seeking "practical, immediate, and peaceful methods of work within the socialist state".

== Bibliography ==
- Avrich, Paul (1971) [1967]. The Russian Anarchists. Princeton: Princeton University Press. ISBN 0-691-00766-7. OCLC 1154930946.
- Serge, Victor (2015) [1921]. "New Tendencies in Russian Anarchism". In Abidor, Mitchell (ed.). Anarchists Never Surrender. Translated by Abidor, Mitchell. Oakland, California: PM Press. ISBN 978-1629630311. OCLC 879244503.
- Svyatogor, Alexander (2018) [1922]. "The Doctrines of the Fathers and Anarcho-Biocosmism". In Groys, Boris (ed.). Russian Cosmism. MIT Press. ISBN 978-0262037433.
- Zimmer, Kenyon (2015). Immigrants Against the State. University of Illinois Press. ISBN 978-0252097430.
