= Gordin =

Gordin may refer to:

== Surname Gordin ==
- Abba Gordin, (1887–1964) anarchist active in the Russian revolution
- Jacob Gordin, Russian-American playwright
- Michael D. Gordin (born 1974), American science historian and Slavist.
- Sidney Gordin (1918–1996), Russian-born American artist, professor
- Yehuda Leib Gordin, (1854–1925) Polish Rabbi who migrated to the US, father of Abba and Zeev Gordin

== In fiction ==
- A minor character in Fire Emblem: Shadow Dragon and the Blade of Light

== See also ==
- Gordon (disambiguation)
