= Maria Nikiforova =

Ukrainian anarchist (1885–1919)

Atamansha Maria Nikiforova
- Марія Нікіфорова
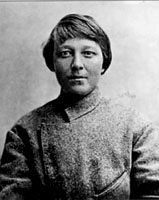
- Nikiforova. Its origin unclear, this photo is believed to have been taken in Yelysavethrad (c. 1918).

Deputy leader of the Oleksandrivsk Revolutionary committee
- In office 4 January 1918 – 18 April 1918
- Preceded by: Position established
- Succeeded by: Position disestablished

Personal details
- Born: 1885 Oleksandrivsk, Katerynoslav, Russian Empire
- Died: 16 September 1919 (aged 33–34) Sevastopol, Taurida, South Russia
- Cause of death: Execution by firing squad
- Spouse: Witold Brzostek
- Nickname: Marusya (Ukrainian: Маруся)

Military service
- Allegiance: France (1914-1917); Ukrainian People's Republic of Soviets (1917-1918); Makhnovshchina (1919)
- Branch/service: (France) French Foreign Legion (1914–1917); Black Guards (1917–1919)
- Years of service: 1914–1919
- Rank: Atamansha
- Commands: Oleksandrivsk Black Guards (1917–1918); Free Combat Druzhina (1918–1919)
- Battles/wars: World War I; Macedonian front; Ukrainian War of Independence; Oleksandrivsk uprising

Maria Hryhorivna Nikiforova (Ukrainian: Марія Григорівна Нікіфорова; 1885–1919) was a Ukrainian anarchist partisan leader who led the Black Guards during the Ukrainian War of Independence, becoming widely renowned as an atamansha. A self-described terrorist from the age of 16, she was imprisoned for her activities in Russia before managing to escape to western Europe. With the outbreak of World War I, she took up the defencist line and joined the French Foreign Legion on the Macedonian front before returning to Ukraine with the outbreak of the 1917 Revolution.

In her home city of Oleksandrivsk (today Zaporizhzhia), she established an anarchist combat detachment and subsequently attacked the forces of the Russian Provisional Government and the Ukrainian People's Republic. After the October Revolution escalated into a civil war, she joined the side of the Ukrainian Soviet Republic, leading her druzhina in capturing Taurida and Yelysavethrad (today Kropyvnytskyi) from the Ukrainian People's Army.

When Ukraine was invaded by the Central Powers, she was forced to flee to Russia, where she was prosecuted for insubordination by the nascent Bolshevik government. When she returned to Ukraine, she briefly participated in the civilian activities of the Makhnovshchina before returning to terrorism. She aimed to assassinate the leaders of the White movement (Anton Denikin and Alexander Kolchak) but was caught and executed.

== Biography ==
=== Early life and exile ===
Born in Oleksandrivsk in 1885, Nikiforova's father had been an officer during the Russo-Turkish War of 1877–1878. She left home at the age of 16, having fallen in love with an "adventurer" who quickly abandoned her in the slums of Oleksandrivsk. To make ends meet, she became a wage laborer, working first as babysitter, then as a retail clerk, and ultimately as a factory worker, washing bottles in a vodka distillery.

Shortly after starting work, she joined a local anarchist communist group, which had been established in the lead up to the 1905 Revolution. Following a period of political probation, Nikiforova became involved in the group's campaign of "motiveless terrorism", during which she staged a number of bombings and expropriation missions, including armed robberies. When Nikiforova was captured, she attempted to commit suicide by blowing herself up, but the bomb failed and she was imprisoned. In 1908, her trial for murder and armed robbery resulted in Nikiforova being sentenced to capital punishment, although this was later commuted to life imprisonment with hard labor, due to her young age. She served part of her sentence in solitary confinement in St. Petersburg's Petropavlovsk prison, before being exiled to Siberia in 1910.

After staging a prison riot, she escaped via the Trans-Siberian Railway to Vladivostok and subsequently went on to Japan. A group of Chinese anarchists secured her passage to the United States, where she briefly stayed with other exiled Russian anarchists and published articles in their Russian language newspapers. In 1912, she joined the anarchist movement in Spain and participated in a bank robbery in Barcelona during which she was wounded and forced to clandestinely seek treatment in Paris. Herself an intersex woman, Nikiforova also reportedly underwent a medical intervention while being treated.

In the cafes of the French capital, Nikiforova met a number of exiled Russian artists and politicians, one of which was the Ukrainian Social-Democrat Vladimir Antonov-Ovseenko, and even became an artist herself, specializing in painting and sculpting. During this time, she also entered into a marriage of convenience with a Polish anarchist named Witold Brozstek, retaining her last name. Towards the end of 1913, she attended an anarchist conference in London, signing her name as "Marusya", a Slavic diminutive form of "Maria". With the outbreak of World War I, she sided with Peter Kropotkin's anti-German position, in favor of the Allied powers. She joined up with the French Foreign Legion and subsequently graduated as an officer from a military college. Nikiforova served on the Macedonian front before the outbreak of the 1917 Revolution convinced her to quit the front and return home.

=== Return to Oleksandrivsk ===
When Nikiforova arrived in Petrograd, she found the city in a situation of "dual power", with both the Provisional Government and the local soviet vying for control while the anarchists mostly acted as shock troops of anti-government unrest. Nikiforova organized and spoke at pro-anarchist rallies in Kronstadt, where she convinced thousands of sailors to participate in an uprising against the Provisional Government. As the Bolsheviks withheld their support from the uprising, it was ultimately suppressed. Nikiforova narrowly escaped the subsequent government crackdown in Petrograd and fled back to her home city of Oleksandrivsk, finally arriving in July 1917 after eight years in exile. Shortly after arrival, together with the city's 300-strong Anarchist Federation and supported by local factory workers, Nikiforova carried out the expropriation of the local distillery, donating part of the seized money to the local soviet. She soon established a 60-strong anarchist combat detachment and started accumulating armaments procured from attacks on police stations and warehouses, with which she hunted down and executed many of the city's army officers and landlords.

On 29 August 1917, she met with the peasant leader Nestor Makhno in the anarchist-controlled town of Huliaipole, where she gave a speech advocating for an insurrection against the rule of the newly established Central Council of Ukraine, warning of a potential counter-revolution. Partway through Nikiforova's speech, the anarchists received news from Petrograd of an attempted coup by Lavr Kornilov and resolved to form a Committee for the Defence of the Revolution (CDR). When the CDR began making plans to seize weapons from the local bourgeoisie, Nikiforova countered with a plan of her own: to raid the nearby garrison at Orikhiv. By 10 September, she had pulled together 200 fighters, armed only with only a few dozen weapons, and set out for Orikhiv by train. Upon arrival, the anarchist detachment surrounded and captured the Russian Army regiments. Nikiforova ordered the execution of all officers and disarmed the rank-and-file soldiers before letting them return to their homes. She delivered the captured weapons back to the CDR in Huliaipole, then returned to Oleksandrivsk herself. In recognition of Nikiforova's help, Makhno named one of his commando brigades "Marusya" after her.

Huliaipole subsequently began to receive threats from the local organ of the Provisional Government in Oleksandrivsk, which was disturbed by the rising anarchist influence in the region. Makhno responded by traveling to the city with Nikiforova as a guide and speaking directly to the local workers' organizations. After Makhno left the city, the authorities swiftly arrested and imprisoned Nikiforova. News of her arrest quickly spread; a delegation of workers demanded her release the next day. After being rebuffed by the Provisional Government, the workers forcibly brought the leader of the soviet to the prison and secured her release, following which Nikiforova gave a speech to the crowd, calling for anarchy. Anarchists from Huliaipole, who had been dispatched to attack Oleksandrivsk and force Nikiforova's release, celebrated upon hearing that their work had already been carried out.

During the subsequent election to the Oleksandrivsk soviet, the composition of the new body was distinctly more left-wing and included a number of anarchist delegates.

=== Battle for Oleksandrivsk ===
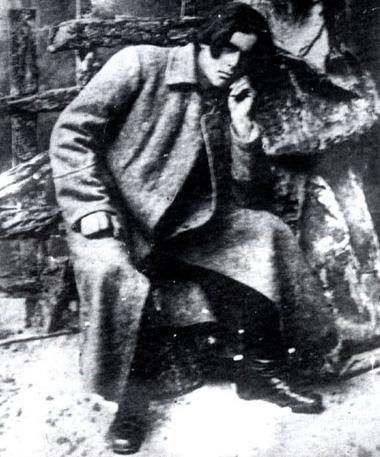
Nestor Makhno (1918), future leader of the Makhnovshchina, was still a minor militia leader when he first encountered Nikiforova.

Nikiforova welcomed the outbreak of the October Revolution as another step towards the "withering away of the state". She set about establishing armed detachments known as the "Black Guards" in Oleksandrivsk, preparing an organized anarchist response for a conflict that was rapidly escalating into civil war. In November 1917, the Oleksandrivsk Soviet voted 147 to 95 in favor of joining the Ukrainian People's Republic and refused to recognize the authority of the newly proclaimed Russian Soviet Republic. Nikiforova responded by allying with the local revolutionary socialists, securing a clandestine shipment of weaponry and the support of the local detachment of the Black Sea Fleet. On 12 December, they launched their uprising, managing to overthrow the Soviet and reconstitute it with delegates from the Bolsheviks, Left SRs and anarchists.

On 25 December, Nikiforova and her detachment went to Kharkiv, where they collaborated in the establishment of the Ukrainian People's Republic of Soviets while also expropriating goods from the local shops and redistributing them to the population. A few days later, she led Black Guards into battle against the haydamaks at Katerynoslav, capturing the city for the Soviets and personally disarming 48 soldiers. Civil war became an inevitability following the dissolution of the Russian Constituent Assembly by the All-Russian Central Executive Committee, as the Bolsheviks began to look towards the anarchists around Nikiforova as a necessary base of support in Ukraine. While she had been away, her home city of Oleksandrivsk had fallen again under the control of the Central Council of Ukraine after three days of fighting, forcing the local anarchist detachments to withdraw. On 2 January 1918, the city was again recaptured after the arrival of Red Guards from Russia and Black Guards from Huliaipole, forcing the haydamaks in turn to retreat to right-bank Ukraine. Two days later, a revolutionary committee (Revkom) was constituted as the center of soviet power in Oleksandrivsk. Nikiforova was elected as its deputy leader.

As the haymadaks fled, cossacks were already beginning to return from the external front in order to join up with Alexey Kaledin's Army, and Oleksandrivsk was in the path towards their home regions of the Don and Kuban. With the Black Guards scrambling to rally their defenses, a failed assault by the first wave of Cossacks ended in their disarmament by the Revkom. While the disarmament took place, the city politicians' speeches, attempting to rally the Cossacks to the cause of socialism, were largely ignored and even mocked. When Nikiforova spoke, calling on the "butchers of the Russian workers" to renounce the old ways of Tsarism, many of the Cossacks began to display humility; some openly wept and others maintained contact with the local anarchists. When the Cossacks departed, Makhno and Nikiforova returned to their duties in the Revkom. After a dispute between the two regarding the sentencing of the prosecutor that had overseen Makhno's own imprisonment, Makhno decided to renounce his position and return to Huliaipole, leaving Nikiforova in place as the sole commander of Oleksandrivsk's Black Guards.

=== The Free Combat Druzhina ===
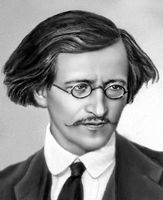
Vladimir Antonov-Ovseyenko was a longtime ally of Nikiforova's, having met her in Paris years earlier. He provided her with needed political and material support from within the Bolshevik party.

In a joint operation together with the Huliaipole anarchists, Nikiforova launched another raid against the garrison in Orikhiv, seizing a cache of arms and sending them on to Huliaipole, rather than handing them over to her nominal commander Semyon Bogdanov. As Nikiforova's Black Guards had helped to establish Soviet power in the eastern Ukrainian cities of Kharkiv, Katerynoslav and Oleksandrivsk, she enjoyed the unqualified support of the Ukrainian Soviet commander-in-chief, Vladimir Antonov-Ovseenko, who gave her funds to upgrade her detachment, which became known as the Free Combat Druzhina.

Reinforced by extra troops, the Druzhina was supplied with artillery cannons, armored cars, tachankas, warhorses and even an armored train, which they decorated with a number of anarchist flags, leaving them better-equipped than even the units of the Red Guards. The militants of the Druzhina also largely rejected uniform, in favor of their own individual senses of fashion. While the core of the group was personally loyal to Nikiforova, including a number of experienced veterans of the Black Sea Fleet, the larger section around them participated in the unit on a more ephemeral basis.

Travelling in echelon formations, which the Left SR politician Isaac Steinberg compared to the mythical Flying Dutchman, the Druzhina advanced against the forces of the White movement and the Ukrainian nationalists. The Druzhina pushed as far as Crimea, where they captured Yalta, sacked Livadia Palace and liberated anarchist political prisoners in Sevastopol. Having participated in the establishment of the Taurida Soviet Socialist Republic, Nikiforova was elected to head the Peasant Soviet in Feodosia and used her new position to establish more detachments of the Black Guards.

=== Battle for Yelysavethrad ===
The Druzhina then moved on to the central Ukrainian city of Yelysavethrad, bloodlessly capturing the city from the Ukrainian nationalists and establishing a revolutionary committee to oversee its transition to Soviet power. While occupying the city, she assassinated a Russian officer, expropriated local stores and redistributed basic necessities to the population, and established a barter economy for non-essential goods, all in open defiance the Bolshevik-controlled Revkom. Nikiforova accused the Revkom of being too tolerant towards the bourgeoisie and having constituted a new ruling class, even threatening to disperse the organ and shoot its chairman, due to her opposition to all forms of government. The Revkom responded by ordering her to leave the city, which she did a few days later, after looting the city's military college of all their weapons, leaving behind a newly established local detachment of Black Guards.

The Central Council of Ukraine responded to the rapid Soviet advance by signing a treaty with the Central Powers. With the support of the Ukrainian haydamaks, the Austro-Hungarian Army and Imperial German Army launched an invasion of Ukraine, pushing the Soviet lines back again. When the German forces arrived at Yelysavethrad, the Revkom immediately evacuated, leaving a power vacuum in the city. While the occupying powers attempted to recruit men to its side, even conscripting the local peasantry into service, the Druzhina returned to occupy Yelysavethrad, taking over the local railway station and regularly touring the city to expropriate money from the bourgeoisie. After days of tense peace between the city's official government and the anarchists, a conflict broke out between the anarchists and local factory workers, giving the government forces an opportunity to move against the Druzhina. The anarchists managed to defend themselves against the assault, but they were far outnumbered, forcing them to withdraw to Kanatovo, where they discovered that a number of their soldiers had been taken prisoner.

Red Guards led by Alexander Belenkevich attempted to retake the city, but they were surrounded and wiped out within hours of arrival, prompting the city authorities to beginning executing their prisoners of war. Nikiforova subsequently led the Druzhina in an assault by rail, digging in at the suburbs, where they were met by thousands of well-armed troops, who began spreading rumours to the local population that depicted Nikiforova as a sacrilegious bandit leader. The battle descended into a war of attrition, with constant artillery and machine gun fire exchanged between the trenches over the course of two days. On 26 February, the Druzhina was reinforced by a detachment of Red Guards from Kamensk, but these troops were largely ineffective against the city's defenses. Under heavy bombardment, the Druzhina fell back to Znamianka, where they were reinforced by more Red Guards under the command of Mikhail Muravyov, fresh from their victory in the Battle of Kyiv. The city's authorities had requested reinforcements from the Central Powers, but none arrived, leaving the city vulnerable to a Soviet assault. While the Ukrainian nationalists held off Nikiforova's advance from the north, Andrei Polupanov led an assault against the largely undefended south, forcing the city to capitulate. The city's authorities complied with the Soviet demands and released Nikiforova's imprisoned soldiers, with the city ultimately remaining in Soviet hands until 19 March, when an Imperial German assault forced the Soviet forces to evacuate.

=== Retreat ===
The forces of the Ukrainian Soviet Republic were ultimately unable to withstand the combined assault of the Central Powers, with only sporadic resistance delaying the offensive. After leaving Yelysavethrad, the Druzhina stooped in Berezivka, where they came into conflict with another anarchist detachment led by Grigory Kotovsky, after Nikiforova had attempted to extort money from the town's inhabitants. The Druzhina subsequently abandoned their train and reformed as a cavalry detachment, arranging their horses by fur color, with Nikiforova herself riding at the head on a white horse.

The Druzhina rendezvoused with other Soviet forces at Preobrazhenka, finding the local estate in the hands of the Bolshevik commander Ivan Matveyev. Nikiforova immediately set about seizing the estate's goods and redistributing them to the local population, to the annoyance of Matveyev, who she was still formally subordinated to. Matveyev resolved to disarm the Druzhina before any more anarchists arrived at the rendezvous. He called a general meeting in which the principles of unity and discipline were to be discussed, but when Bolsheviks started making complaints about the anarchists, Nikiforova immediately understood the true purpose of the meeting and signalled her partisans to leave, escaping the village on horseback before they could be disarmed. When Antonov-Ovseenko learned of the planned disarmament of Nikiforova's forces, he rebuked the local Bolsheviks, telling them: "Instead of disarming such revolutionary fighting units, I would advise you to create them."

The Druzhina subsequently moved towards Oleksandrivsk, hoping to defend it from the Central Powers. Upon arrival, they found the city's Red Guards were already organizing their retreat. On 13 April, the Ukrainian Sich Riflemen were able to capture the city, finding the dead body of a woman that they mistakenly believed to be Nikiforova. On 18 April, they were followed by the Imperial German Army, which forced out the remaining Soviet forces, with the Druzhina being one of the last Soviet detachments to leave. They subsequently linked up with Nestor Makhno's forces in Tsarekostyantynivka, where they found out that Huliaipole had also fallen to the Ukrainian nationalists. Nikiforova proposed a mission to rescue captured members of the town's revolutionary committee, but after a number of Red commanders refused to join and news came in of the continued German advance, she abandoned the plan and continued to retreat east.

=== Trials ===
Following the Soviet defeat in Ukraine, the Bolsheviks no longer saw the use in their anarchist allies and repressions against the Russian anarchist movement began to be carried out by the Cheka. Upon Nikiforova's arrival in Taganrog, she was immediately arrested on charges of looting and desertion, while the Druzhina was finally disarmed, in an operation overseen by the Ukrainian Bolshevik leader Volodymyr Zatonsky. The local anarchists and Left SRs demanded an explanation for Nikiforova's arrest, with Vladimir Antonov-Ovseenko himself sending a telegram in support of the anarchists, while further arrivals of Ukrainian anarchists to the city began to make the situation untenable. In April 1918, a revolutionary tribunal was held by the Ukrainian Bolsheviks. With witnesses both for the prosecution and the defense in attendance, Nikiforova was confident that revolutionary justice would be upheld and she was ultimately acquitted on all charges.

The anarchists in Taganrog subsequently held a conference about the situation in Ukraine, during which Makhno and the Huliaipole anarchists decided they would return to southern Ukraine and carry out a campaign of guerrilla warfare against the Central Powers. Other anarchists joined Nikiforova's Druzhina, but the continued German offensive forced them to retreat to Rostov-on-Don, where they looted the local banks and burned all the bonds, deeds and loan agreements they found in a public bonfire. Here too, Nikiforova noticed that the Bolsheviks were closing in on them and decided to take the Druzhina north towards Voronezh, and over the following months they moved between a number of towns along the Ukrainian border. After the defeat of the Central Powers forced them to withdraw from Ukraine, the Ukrainian State was overthrown by the Directorate of Ukraine under Symon Petliura, making room for the Druzhina to finally return to the country in late 1918. In the subsequent power struggle, the Druzhina managed to seize Odesa from the White movement, demolishing the prison before an armed intervention by the Allied Powers forced them to quit the city.

The Druzhina then moved on to Saratov, where it was again disarmed and Nikiforova herself was again arrested. The Cheka were reluctant to execute her without trial and had her transferred to Moscow, where she was briefly held in Butyrka prison. She was released on bail, posted by Apollon Karelin and Vladimir Antonov-Ovseenko, and she was reunited with her husband, who had taken a job in the new Soviet government. After a spell of working for the artistic institution Proletkult, Nikiforova's trial by revolutionary tribunal began on 21 January 1919. She was presented with the same charges that the Taganrog tribunal had already acquitted her of, with Georgy Pyatakov accusing her again of looting and desertion. On 25 January, Pravda announced that she had been found guilty of insubordination, although she had again been acquitted on the charges of looting, and that her punishment was a ban on holding any public office for six months.

=== Activities in Huliaipole ===
Almost immediately following the trial, Nikiforova set out for Huliaipole, now the center of an autonomous anarchist republic known as the Makhnovshchina, as part of an agreement between Nestor Makhno's Revolutionary Insurgent Army and the Ukrainian Bolsheviks. Upon her arrival, Makhno had Nikiforova put in charge of the anarchists' hospitals, nurseries and schools, forbidding her from participating in military activities due to the terms of her sentence. Nikiforova's anti-Bolshevik attitude became an immediate problem for the Makhnovists, who were more focused on fighting the White movement, with Makhno himself physically removing her from a stage after she publicly denounced the Bolsheviks during a Regional Congress. When she briefly returned to Oleksandrivsk, any anarchists she met or stayed with were promptly arrested by the Cheka.

During the spring of 1919, Huliaipole was visited several times by a series of high-ranking Bolsheviks, during which Nikiforova acted as a hostess. Antonov-Ovseenko recalled meeting his "old acquaintance" on 28 April, while reviewing Makhno's troops and the city of Huliaipole. Seeking to clarify rumors of corruption and counter-revolutionary activity among Makhno's ranks and the soviet of the city, Antonov-Ovseenko wrote glowingly of his impression of Huliaipole. Ultimately, Antonov-Ovseenko's attempts to lobby for military support for the anarchists were unsuccessful and his political power declined. Within weeks of his visit, he was replaced as commander-in-chief by Jukums Vācietis.

Nevertheless, Antonov-Ovseenko's reports quickly attracted Lev Kamenev to himself visit Huliaipole the very next week. Nikiforova met Kamenev and his entourage at the train station, and offered to escort them into the city. After meeting Makhno and touring the city, Kamenev was impressed with Nikiforova, and upon returning to Katerynoslav, he telegraphed Moscow officials with an order that her sentence be reduced to half of its original term.

=== Capture and death ===
Following news of the reduction of her sentence, Nikiforova moved to Berdiansk and began work on establishing a new detachment of Black Guards, bringing together a number of former Makhnovists and anarchist refugees, including her husband Witold Brzostek. By June 1919, the Makhnovshchina had been outlawed by the Ukrainian Socialist Soviet Republic and the Red Army had launched an offensive against the Makhnovist rear, forcing the Ukrainian anarchists to regroup. While Makhno moved towards consolidating his military force, Nikiforova returned to her old ways, deciding to carry out a campaign of terrorism against all enemies of the Ukrainian anarchists. When the pair reunited at Tokmak, Nikiforova asked Makhno for money to fund her terrorist campaign. The meeting quickly devolved into a Mexican standoff as the two drew guns on each other, but Makhno ultimately decided to give her some of the insurgent army's funds.

Nikiforova subsequently split up her detachment into three and dispatched them to different fronts. She sent one group to Siberia, where they were ordered to assassinate Alexander Kolchak, the Supreme Ruler of the Russian State, but they were ultimately unable to locate him and instead decided to join the anti-White partisans. The other group went to Kharkiv, where they were ordered to free anarchist political prisoners and blow up the headquarters of the Cheka, but by the time they arrived the city had been evacuated and the prisoners had been shot. They decided to move on to Moscow, where they carried out a series of armed robberies to fund their planned operation to assassinate the Bolshevik Party leadership. On 25 September 1919, they managed to kill 12 and wound 55 other leading Bolsheviks in a bomb attack on a party meeting. The group was eventually wiped out during shoot outs with the Cheka, with the last remaining members blowing themselves up after being surrounded in a dacha.

Nikiforova and Brzostek themselves led the third group to Crimea, the headquarters of South Russia, where they planned to assassinate the White commander-in-chief Anton Denikin. On 11 August, the couple were recognized by a White officer in Sevastopol and arrested, forcing the rest of the group to quit Crimea and flee to the Kuban People's Republic, where they joined the region's anti-White partisans. After spending a month gathering evidence, on 16 September, Nikiforova and Brzostek were court-martialed by Vladimir Subbotin, the Governor of Sevastopol. Nikiforova was charged with having executed counter-revolutionaries, including White officers and the bourgeoisie, while Brzostek was charged simply with having been her husband during these events. Throughout the trial, Nikiforova displayed persistent contempt of court, swearing at the tribunal as her sentence was read. The couple were both found guilty and sentenced to execution by firing squad, with Nikiforova finally breaking down into tears as she said goodbye to her husband, before they were both shot.

On 20 September, the Oleksandrivsk Telegraph reported on Nikiforova's death, celebrating it as a victory for the White movement. Only two weeks later, the city was recaptured by the Makhnovshchina.

== Political positions ==
=== Anarchism and revolution ===
In her youth, Nikiforova entered anarcho-communist politics and adopted militant tactics to pursue them. Widely known as an anarchist, she was said to constantly wear entirely black clothing as a symbol of her libertarian philosophy. Throughout her years of activism, Nikiforova gave numerous speeches espousing her anarchist political opinions. She favored immediate and complete redistribution of property owned by wealthy land owners, declaring, "The workers and peasants must, as quickly as possible, seize everything that was created by them over many centuries and use it for their own interests." She insisted that anarchists could not guarantee positive social change: "The anarchists are not promising anything to anyone." She cautioned, "The anarchists only want people to be conscious of their own situation and seize freedom for themselves."

=== Conflicts with Soviet authority ===
Upon returning to Russia in 1917, Nikiforova was influenced by Apollon Karelin, a veteran anarchist who advocated a tactical strategy of "Soviet anarchism." Meeting her in Petrograd, Karelin's political tactics encouraged anarchist participation in Soviet institutions with the long-term plan of directing them towards an anarchist agenda, provided these institutions did not deviate from revolutionary goals. In the event that they deviated from a radical agenda, anarchists were to rebel against them. Such institutional cooperation was widely disliked among anarchists, as they were largely a minority within such institutions, rendering their activity ineffectual.

Nikiforova agreed to ally with the Bolsheviks under special circumstances and negotiated to have herself appointed to a soviet institution, briefly becoming the Deputy leader of the Oleksandrivsk revkom. She would go on to help establish footholds for Soviet power in several Ukrainian cities, demanding material support from Bolshevik agents in return, which she then used to pursue her anarchist agenda. While she allied herself with the Red Army on multiple occasions, she was constantly at odds with their commanders and personally antagonized several, arguing against some their practices on revolutionary grounds. Upon discovering that a Soviet commander was hoarding luxury goods looted from an aristocrat's home, she angrily confronted him for his selfishness. "The property of the estate owners doesn't belong to any particular detachment," she declared "but to the people as a whole. Let the people take what they want."

== Legacy ==
=== Postmortem mythology ===
Rumours about her alleged survival persisted after Nikiforova's death. In the years following her death, Nikiforova was rumoured to have become a Soviet spy in Paris, where she was alleged to have been involved in the assassination of the Ukrainian nationalist leader Symon Petliura by the Ukrainian Jewish anarchist Sholom Schwartzbard.

Her legacy also created an opportunity for copycats, with a number of partisan women adopting the name of "Marusya" as a pseudonym throughout the remainder of the Ukrainian War of Independence. In 1919, a 25-year-old Ukrainian nationalist school teacher adopted the name Marusya Sokolovska and took command her late brother's cavalry detachment, before she was captured by the Reds and shot. In 1920–1921, Marusya Chernaya (English: Black Maria) was also commander of a cavalry regiment in the Revolutionary Insurgent Army of Ukraine, before dying in battle against the Red Army. During the Tambov Rebellion in Russia, one of the rebel commanders was a woman named Marusya Kosova, who disappeared after the suppression of the revolt.

=== Historiography ===
Nikiforova's illicit activities meant that she left very few records during her life, only emerging as a public figure during her final years as a military commander. Available accounts of her life have either come from her military service record or from the memoirs of her contemporaries, such as Nestor Makhno and Viktor Bilash.

Nikiforova's biography was largely neglected by Soviet historiography, which focused its women's history largely on female Bolsheviks, only ever referencing Nikiforova briefly and using negative depictions. She has likewise been largely neglected in Ukrainian historiography, as her staunch anti-nationalist positions directly contradicted the historical narratives of Ukrainian nationalism, as well as anarchist historiography, which has focused most of its attention on Nestor Makhno. Nevertheless, following the dissolution of the Soviet Union, there has been a renewed interest in Nikiforova, with several essays and a biography about her life being published during the 21st century.

== See also ==
- Anarchism in Ukraine
- Anarchism and violence
- Olha Taratuta
- Propaganda of the deed
- Women in the First World War
- Women in the military
- Women in warfare (1900–1939)
- Woman warrior

Lists

- List of guerrillas
- List of military commanders
- List of Ukrainians

== Bibliography ==
- Archibald, Malcolm (2007). Atamansha: The Story of Maria Nikiforova, the Anarchist Joan of Arc. Edmonton: Black Cat Press. ISBN 978-0-9737827-0-7. OCLC 239359065.
- Darch, Colin (2020). Nestor Makhno and Rural Anarchism in Ukraine, 1917-1921. London: Pluto Press. ISBN 9781786805263. OCLC 1225942343.
- Kotlyar, Yuriy (2020). "Жінки Півдня України у селянських повстаннях першої третини ХХ ст" [Women of Southern Ukraine in the peasant uprisings of the first third of the 20th century]. The Universe of History and Archeology (in Ukrainian). 3 (1): 60–69. doi:10.15421/26200105. ISSN 2707-6385. S2CID 230640835.
- Malet, Michael (1982). Nestor Makhno in the Russian Civil War. London: Palgrave Macmillan. ISBN 978-0-333-25969-6. OCLC 8514426.
- Morozova, Olga Mikhailovna (2022). "Во главе чернознаменного войска: Маруся Никифорова в 1917–1918 гг" [At the Head of the Black Banner Army: Marusya Nikiforova in 1917–18]. Herald of an Archivist (in Russian) (1): 164–185. doi:10.28995/2073-0101-2022-1-164-185. ISSN 2073-0101. OCLC 9478398170. S2CID 248255192.
- Mytrofanenko, Yurii Stanislavovych (2023). "Анархістки Марія (Маруся) Нікіфорова та Галина (Агафія) Кузьменко: гендерно-персоналістичний вимір революційної доби 1917-1921 рр" [Anarchists Maria (Marusya) Nikiforova and Halyna (Agafia) Kuzmenko: The Gendered Personalistic Dimension of the Revolutionary Era of 1917-1921]. Південний Архів (історичні Науки) (in Ukrainian) (40): 20–28. doi:10.32999/ksu2786-5118/2022-40-3. ISSN 2786-5118. OCLC 9764621258. S2CID 256798027.
- Palij, Michael (1976). The Anarchism of Nestor Makhno, 1918–1921. Seattle, WA. United states: University of Washington Press. ISBN 0-295-95511-2. OCLC 2372742.
- Peters, Victor (1970). Nestor Makhno: The Life of an Anarchist. Winnipeg: Echo Books. OCLC 7925080.
- Shubin, Aleksandr (2010). "The Makhnovist Movement and the National Question in the Ukraine, 1917–1921". In Hirsch, Steven J.; van der Walt, Lucien (eds.). Anarchism and Syndicalism in the Colonial and Postcolonial World, 1870–1940. Studies in Global Social History. Vol. 6. Leiden: Brill. pp. 147–191. ISBN 9789004188495. OCLC 868808983.
- Skirda, Alexandre (2004). Nestor Makhno: Anarchy's Cossack, the struggle for free Soviets in the Ukraine 1917-1921. Oakland, Ca. United States: AK Press. ISBN 978-1-902593-68-5. OCLC 1902593685.
- Velychenko, Stephen (2011). State building in revolutionary Ukraine. Toronto: University of Toronto Press. ISBN 978-1-4426-4132-7.
