= Vladimir Zabrezhnev =

Russian revolutionary (1877–1939)

- Владимир Забрежнев
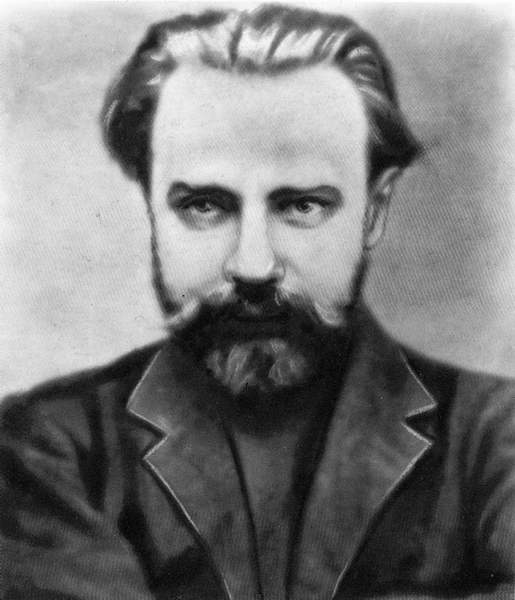
- Born: Vladimir Ivanovich Zabrezhnev; 28 March 1877; Saint Petersburg, Russian Empire
- Died: 9 March 1939 (aged 61); Leningrad, Soviet Russia
- Spouse: Edda Stepanovna Zabrezhneva
- Children: Mikhail Vladimirovich Zabrezhnev, Stepan Vladimirovich Zabrezhnev

Vladimir Ivanovich Zabrezhnev (28 March 1877 – 9 March 1939) was a Russian revolutionary.

== Biography ==
A disciple of the Russian anarchist Peter Kropotkin, during the Russian Revolution of 1905, Zabrezhnev established Moscow's first anarchist group. It dissolved after Zabrezhnev was arrested by police, but was later succeeded by the Svoboda propaganda group in December 1905. Zabrezhnev himself managed to escape from custody and fled to London, where he joined Peter Kropotkin's anarchist group Bread and Freedom.

For this group, Zabrezhnev penned criticisms of the anarchist terrorist groups that carried out attacks in the Russian Empire during this period, which he compared to the "era of dynamite" of the 1890s in France. He believed that the attacks were largely a personal outlet for anger, explained more by individual psychology than anarchist principles. Although he defended violence as a means of self-defence, he believed that "motiveless" terrorist attacks were useless if they weren't accompanied by propaganda, and could alienate the general public from the anarchist movement.

In 1907, Zabrezhnev attended the International Anarchist Congress of Amsterdam as a Russian delegate, along with Nikolai Rogdaev. He later moved to Paris, where he joined Apollon Karelin's anarchist communist group and gave speeches at events commemorating the Paris Commune and the Haymarket affair. Together with other group members, he also wrote for the anarcho-syndicalist newspaper Golos Truda. In 1913, Zabrezhnev, as Karelin's deputy, was accused by other Russian anarchists of seeking power over the movement. The following year, a commission was established to investigate Zabrezhnev and Karelin.

After the February Revolution of 1917, Zabrezhnev returned to Moscow, where he continued contributing to Golos Truda and joined the Moscow Federation of Anarchist Groups. Following the October Revolution, he joined the Russian Communist Party and worked as secretary of the Soviet government's newspaper Izvestia. According to historian Paul Avrich, he died while working on the paper in 1920.

== Essays ==
- "On Terror", in the book: "Russian Revolution and Anarchism. Papers read at the Congress of Communists-Anarchists in October 1906 ”, London, 1907;
- "Preachers of Individualist Anarchism in Russia (Report to the Amsterdam Congress of Anarchist Communists, held on August 24–31, 1907)", "Burevestnik", Paris, 1908, No. 10-11;
- "On individualistic anarchism." London. 1912.
- “The first years of my party work (1895–1899)”, “Proletarian Revolution”, 1923, no. 10;
- "Butyrki 1905 and the first successful escape from them." "Hard labor and exile", 1925, No. 4;
- "Behind the Mass", in the book: "December 1905 at Krasnaya Presnya", 3rd ed., M., 1925.
- "Theory and Practice of Mental Impact", 1922.
- "Controversial Issues of Hypnology", 1925.
- "Problems of Modern Hypnology", 1926.

== Bibliography ==
- Avrich, Paul (1971) [1967]. The Russian Anarchists. Princeton: Princeton University Press. ISBN 0-691-00766-7. OCLC 1154930946.
- Gooderham, P. (1981). The Anarchist Movement In Russia, 1905-1917 (PDF) (PhD thesis). University of Bristol. p. 124.
