= Aleksandrovsk Bolshevik Uprising =

Oleksandrivsk Uprising
- Part of the Ukrainian–Soviet War
Date	25 December 1917 – 2 January 1918
Location	Oleksandrivsk, Ukraine
Result	Uprising initially suppressed by UPA; City occupied by the Red Guards

Belligerents
Ukrainian People's Republic: Central Council	Ukrainian People's Republic of Soviets: Bolsheviks; Anarchists

Commanders and leaders
Mykhailo Hrushevsky; Symon Petliura	Vladimir Antonov-Ovseenko; Aleksei Mokrousov

Units involved
Ukrainian People's Army: 17th Regiment; 49th Regiment; 63rd Regiment; 250 Haydamaks; 40 Free Cossacks	Group of forces in battle with the counterrevolution in the South of Russia: 300 Red Guards; Detachment of the Black Sea Fleet

Casualties and losses
1 killed, 4 wounded	13 Red Guards and 5 sailors killed

The Oleksandrivsk Uprising (Ukrainian: Олександрівське Повстання) was an armed workers' rebellion that broke out against the Central Council of Ukraine in the city of Oleksandrivsk on 25 December [O.S. 12 December] 1917. Led by local Bolsheviks, detachments of the Red Guards and Black Sea Fleet managed to occupy much of the city for 3 days, but were defeated by the forces of the Ukrainian People's Army. Despite the initial UPA victory, on 2 January 1918 [O.S. 20 December 1917], the Red Guards returned to Oleksandrivsk and captured the city, establishing "soviet power".

== Background ==
After the occupation of Kharkiv by the Bolsheviks, the Red Guards and sailors of the Black Sea Fleet were tasked with capturing Synelnykove and Oleksandrivsk, which were important railway junctions in the region. Facing reports that 8,000 heavily armed Bolsheviks were advancing towards Synelnykove, with the aim of cutting off Ukraine from the Don Host, Symon Petliura ordered that the railway track in Oleksandrivsk be dismantled and the city's sailors be detained.

On 12 December [O.S. 29 November] 1917, Petliura began transferring his troops of the Ukrainian People's Army (UPA) to eastern Ukraine, in order to maintain its connection with its allies in the Don Host. This alarmed local Bolsheviks, led by Vladimir Antonov-Ovseenko, who desperately attempted to establish a defensive line through the region, marking the capture of Oleksandrivsk as a necessity to prevent the UPA from linking up with the Don Cossacks. On 16 December [O.S. 3 December] 1917, the Red Guards captured Lozova and began advancing on Oleksandrivsk.

By this time, a conflict between the local Bolsheviks and the Ukrainian authorities was already brewing in Oleksandrivsk, with 40 Free Cossacks, 13 UPA soldiers and a dozen officers facing off against 300 Red Guards. 250 Haydamaks of the 3rd Haydamatsky Kuren were sent from Katerynoslav to reinforce the city's garrison, with whom they captured a number of armored vehicles from the Bolsheviks of the 3rd Rear Auto Repair Shop.

On 24 December [O.S. 11 December] 1917, the Bolsheviks captured Synelnykove and began preparations to attack Oleksandrivsk.

== Battle ==
On the evening of 25 December [O.S. 12 December] 1917, a detachment of sailors of the Black Sea Fleet (led by Aleksei Mokrousov) arrived from Crimea to assist the local Bolsheviks, occupying the city's southern railway station. The city's administration attempted to send delegates to negotiate with the sailors and convince them not to enter the city. But the sailors refused, moving into the city center, where the city's garrison fired on them, killing some and taking the rest as prisoner. After that, the parties exchanged terms for a peaceful settlement of the conflict, with the mayor of Oleksandrivsk acting as a mediator. But the terms proposed were untenable to both sides and fighting continued.

By 26 December [O.S. 13 December] 1917, the Bolsheviks had occupied a large portion of Oleksandrivsk, having seized the post office and the power plant. Despite pleas by the mayor for the Bolsheviks to leave the power plant, due to fears it would stop working and shut down the city's water and energy supply, fighting broke out there and it was shut down. The city council continued trying to broker a peace between the two sides, but was largely unsuccessful.

At this time, the UPA units were largely held up in the Kateryninsky railway station and workshops, which the Bolsheviks themselves failed to capture, with five sailors being killed and the rest taken prisoner. The sailors attempted another offensive against the Kateryninsky workshops, but the UPA troops managed to hold their ground until the arrival of reinforcements from the 17th, 49th and 63rd regiments.

Eventually, the Red Forces were completely surrounded. The city government again attempted to mediate the conflict, aiming to organise ambulances for the wounded and restore the power plant. It eventually negotiated the withdrawal of the sailors from the city and the disarmament of the local Red Guards. After three days of fighting, the uprising had finally been defeated by the combined forces of the UPA and the Cossacks. As a result of the fighting, 13 Red Guards and 5 sailors were killed, while only 1 soldier of the UPA was killed.

== Aftermath ==
The city council reconvened the following week, on 2 January 1918 [O.S. 20 December 1917], and condemned the sailors' uprising. It brought together all of the city's democratic organisations, in an attempt to prevent another armed conflict from breaking out. It also decided to treat the wounded, bury the dead, and not prosecute the participants in the conflict.

But the victory of the Ukrainian forces could not be consolidated. On 2 January 1918 [O.S. 20 December 1917], Vladimir Antonov-Ovseenko's Red Guards, together with anarchist Black Guards from Huliaipole, captured Oleksandrivsk with ease. Some of the Haydamaks and Free Cossacks retreated over the Dnieper, while others remained in the city in order to prepare an anti-Bolshevik uprising.

The Bolshevik occupation of the city brought with it a wave of political repression, as the new authorities outlawed the church and destroyed monuments to Taras Shevchenko.

== Bibliography ==
- Bondar, V.A.; Velychko, E.H. (4 February 2014). "Александровское городское самоуправление в период революционных событий 1917 года (По документам Государственного архива Запорожской области)" [Oleksandrivsk city self-government during the revolutionary events of 1917 (According to the documents of the State Archive of the Zaporizhzhia region)]. Spilna Diya (in Russian). Archived from the original on 13 August 2016.
- Savchenko, Viktor (2006). "Первая война большевиков против Украинской Народной Республики (декабрь 1917 — февраль 1918)" [The first war of the Bolsheviks against the Ukrainian People's Republic (December 1917 - February 1918)]. Двенадцать войн за Украину [Twelve wars for Ukraine] (in Russian). Kharkiv: Folio. ISBN 9789660334564. OCLC 266898877.
- Shchur, Yuri (1 July 2015). "Исторический опыт: Как воевали за Запорожье в 1917 году" [Historical experience: How they fought for Zaporizhzhia in 1917]. Vremya Novostei (in Russian). Archived from the original on 9 July 2015.
