= Ksenia Ge =

Russian communist revolutionary (1892–1919)

- Ксения Ге
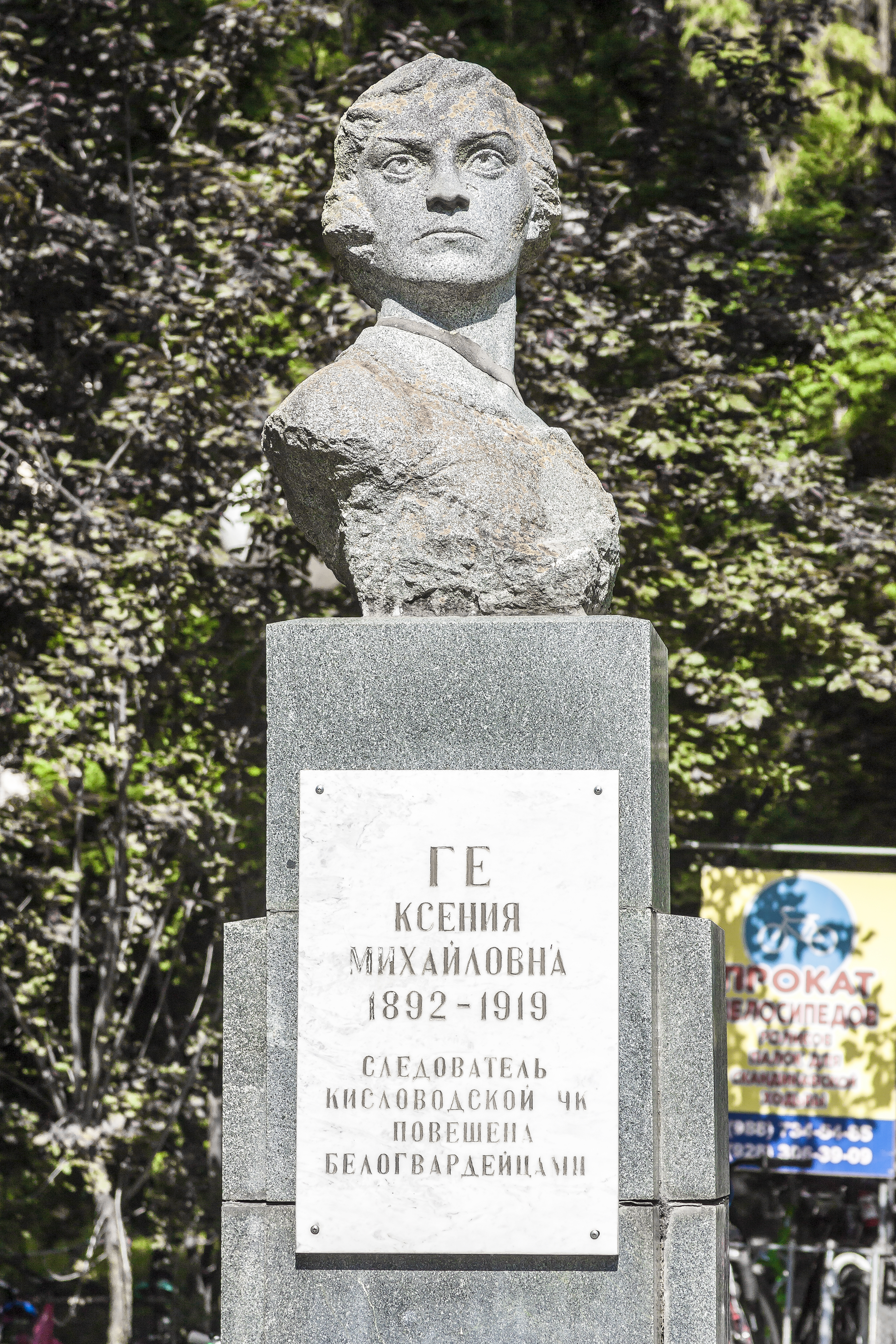
- Bust of Ksenia Ge in Kislovodsk
- Born: Ksenia Mikhailovna Serdyukova; 1892; Chișinău, Bessarabia, Russian Empire (now Moldova)
- Died: 24 January 1919 (aged 26–27); Kislovodsk, South Russia
- Cause of death: Hanging
- Political party: Bolshevik Party
- Spouse: Aleksandr Ge

Ksenia Mikhailovna Ge (née Serdyukova; Russian: Ксения Михайловна Ге; 1892–1919) was a Russian communist revolutionary. Born in Chișinău, she joined the Bolshevik Party while in exile, where she met her husband Aleksandr Ge. After the Russian Revolution of 1917, she moved to the Caucasian city of Kislovodsk, where she worked for the Cheka and the People's Commissariat of Health. After the Volunteer Army captured the city, she was arrested and her husband was killed. She attempted to escape, but was given up and hanged.

== Biography ==
Ksenia Mikhailovna Serdyukova was born in Chișinău, in 1892, the daughter of a military officer. She was educated in Vilnius, after which she went into exile and frequented Russian revolutionary circles, meeting her husband Aleksandr Ge and joining the Bolshevik Party. Following the February Revolution, Ksenia and her husband returned to Russia, settling in Moscow, where they worked for the party. After the October Revolution, Ge moved to Kislovodsk, where she worked as a senior investigator for the Cheka, and as head of the People's Commissariat of Health.

During the White offensive in the Northern Caucasus, Ksenia participated in the defense of Kislovodsk, but facing an overwhelming White force, the Red Army soon fled the city. Ge decided to remain behind, in order to care for her sick daughter, who would have been unable to leave with them. She also persuaded her husband, Aleksandr Ge, to stay with them. On 20 January [O.S. 7 January] 1919, Anton Denikin's Volunteer Army captured Kislovodsk and brought the city under the White Terror. On 21 January, Ge's husband was killed by the Whites while covering the retreat of Chekists fleeing the city. The following day, Ksenia herself was arrested. She was detained in a hotel room, together with her daughter.

=== Death ===
On 23 January, she was sentenced to be hanged by a military tribunal. She managed to escape that same night, disguised in male garments: a burka and a papakha, and fled to Yessentuki on foot, leaving behind her sleeping daughter and a letter addressed to her mother and late husband. She took refuge with a local doctor, but he gave her up to the Whites, in return for a bounty of 50,000 rubles. Ge was taken back to Kislovodsk, where, on 24 January 1919, she was hanged on Cossack Hill. Her daughter continued to face torture by the Whites; a hotel manager attempted to rescue her, but she died soon after.

== Memorial ==
In 1957, a monument to Ksenia Ge, sculpted by Khamzat Krymshamkhalov, was erected in Kislovodsk. On 19 August 2018, the monument was vandalised with graffiti, which spelled the name of Andrei Shkuro, a member of the White movement and later the SS Cossacks of Nazi Germany, who became a popular figure in extremist Russian nationalist circles.
