= Yehuda Leib Gordin =

Polish rabbi

- Born: 1853; Rezhitsa
- Died: April 11, 1925 (aged 71); Chicago
- Occupation: Rabbi

Yehuda Leib Gordin (1853–1925) was a Polish rabbi, a gaon and Hebrew scholar. After serving nine years as a rabbi in Michalishok, then becoming chief of the rabbinical court in Ostrow, he became a rabbi in the city of Smorgon from 1903 to 1910. After leaving Smorgon, he became rabbi and head of the rabbinical court in Łomża.

During World War I, Gordin interceded with military authorities on behalf of local Jews who faced expulsion and accusations of espionage. He also supported religious education in Łomża, helping to rebuild the city's Talmud Torah and renew the Lomza Yeshiva during the German occupation. After the war, the yeshiva's dean, Yechiel Mordechai Gordon, asked him to travel to the United States to raise funds for the heavily indebted institution. The campaign helped stabilize the yeshiva, and its soup kitchen was named Beis Lechem Yehuda in his honor.

The Chicago Daily Tribune wrote that Gordin was internationally renowned within Orthodox Judaism and was known as one of its foremost Hebrew scholars. Gordin was known as a Zionist. His published works included the responsa Divrei Yehuda (1905) and Teshuvot Yehuda (1908), the homiletical work Diglei Yehuda (1904), and Russian-language books explaining Hasidism and the Talmud. He corresponded with Leo Tolstoy and was known for breadth and depth of learning. His defense of the Talmud against antisemitic attacks was cited in the Beilis Trial.

In 1908, two of his sons, Abba Gordin and Wolf (Ze'ev) Gordin, established a secular Hebrew school despite opposition from area Orthodox Jews; they became prominent anarchists during the early Russian Revolution. A third son, Morris Gordin, became a Communist Party member, later converting to Christianity. His eldest daughter, Bluma, mother to David Raziel, emigrated to Palestine in 1914.

In 1922, Gordin accepted the leadership of the Tifereth Zion congregation in Chicago, the rabbinical training school (Beth Hamedrash L'Horah), and the city's orthodox rabbinical association as the chief rabbi of the city. He died of heart disease during his evening prayers on April 11, 1925. A hundred Jewish organizations met to organize his services, which were held two days later. An estimated 30,000 people attended the procession. The crowd was too dense to navigate for six blocks surrounding the procession. Later that month, 10,000 Jews met in silent prayer for the rabbi.
