= Alexei Borovoi =

Russian anarchist (1875–1935)

Alexei Alexeevich Borovoi
- Алексей Алексеевич Боровой
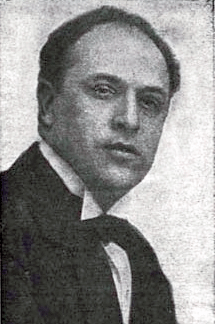
- Born: 11 November 1875; Moscow, Russian Empire
- Died: 21 November 1935 (aged 60); Vladimir, RSFSR

Philosophical work
- Main interests: Anarchism

Alexei Alexeyevich Borovoi (1875–1935) was a Russian individualist anarchist writer, orator, teacher and propagandist.

== Biography ==
Borovoi was born on 30 October 1875 in Moscow. In 1906, Borovoi began giving lectures about anarchism in a number of Russian cities.

He moved to France in late 1910 to escape state persecution for anti-state propaganda. After returning to Russia, he became a political economy and history teacher at the Russian Popular University and at the Free College of Social Sciences, the latter of which had been founded by French anarchists. From their influence Borovoi became interested on French syndicalism, which he voiced his support for in lectures, denying parliamentarism and calling for a social revolution to radically reconstruct society.

In April 1917, Borovoi helped to organize teachers and doctors into the Federation of Unions of Workers of Intellectual Labour, and went on to edit the union's official organ The Call (Russian: Клич). In 1918 he published Anarchism, in which he focused on the "continuous quest for the aim" of Anarchy, rather than on the titular anarchism. He manifested there that "No social ideal, from the point of view of anarchism, could be referred to as absolute in a sense that supposes it’s the crown of human wisdom, the end of social and ethical quest of man."

In early 1918, Borovoi established the Union of Ideological Propaganda of Anarchism and also edited its official organ, the daily newspaper Life (Russian: Жизнь). But within months, the Soviet authorities had closed a number of anarchist propaganda organs, including Life. Despite the repression, Borovoi continued holding lectures about anarchist theory and history, and publishing the literature of classical anarchism, until Autumn 1922, when he was stripped of his status as a professor and banned from teaching. In May 1929, the OGPU arrested Borovoi and on 12 July he was sentenced to three years' exile in Vyatka. Isolated and living in poverty, he spent his final years working as an accountant in Vladimir, where he died on 21 November 1935.

== Work ==
- Revolutionary Creativity and Parliament (1917)
- Anarchism (1918)
- Individual and Society in the Anarchist Worldview (1921)
