= Anarkhiia =

Russian newspaper(1917–1918)

- Editor: German Askarov
- Publisher: Moscow Federation of Anarchist Groups
- First issue: September 1, 1917; 109 years ago
- Final issue: July 2, 1918
- Country: Russia
- Based in: Moscow

Anarkhiia was Russian weekly, then daily newspaper published by the Moscow Federation of Anarchist Groups. It was edited by German Askarov. It was first launched in September 1917, published from the headquarters of the MFAG in the "House of Anarchy," formerly the Chamber of Commerce, on Malaia Dimitrovka Street. Anarkhiia was suspended in the confusion arising over the Bolshevik seizure of power. It reappeared in March 1918 as a daily newspaper expressing anarchist fury over the Bolshevik acquiescence to German Imperialism in the Brest-Litovsk Treaty. Production was interrupted by the Cheka raid on the House of Anarchy, on 12 April 1918. However about a fortnight later it was relaunched from the temporary address of 1 Nastasinsky, previously the home of the Poets' Club in the basement. The last issue, the 99th, was published on 2 July 1918.

== Creativity Section ==
From 1918 the paper had a section devoted to Tvorchestvo or "creativity". It featured many prominent Russian avant-garde artists such as Aleksei Gan, Kazimir Malevich (pen name Anti), Aleksandr Rodchenko (pen name Aleksandr), Aleksei Morgunov, Ivan Kliun, Olga Rozanova and Nadezhda Udaltsova.
