= Abba Gordin =

Belarusian anarchist and writer (1887–1964)

- אבא גורדין
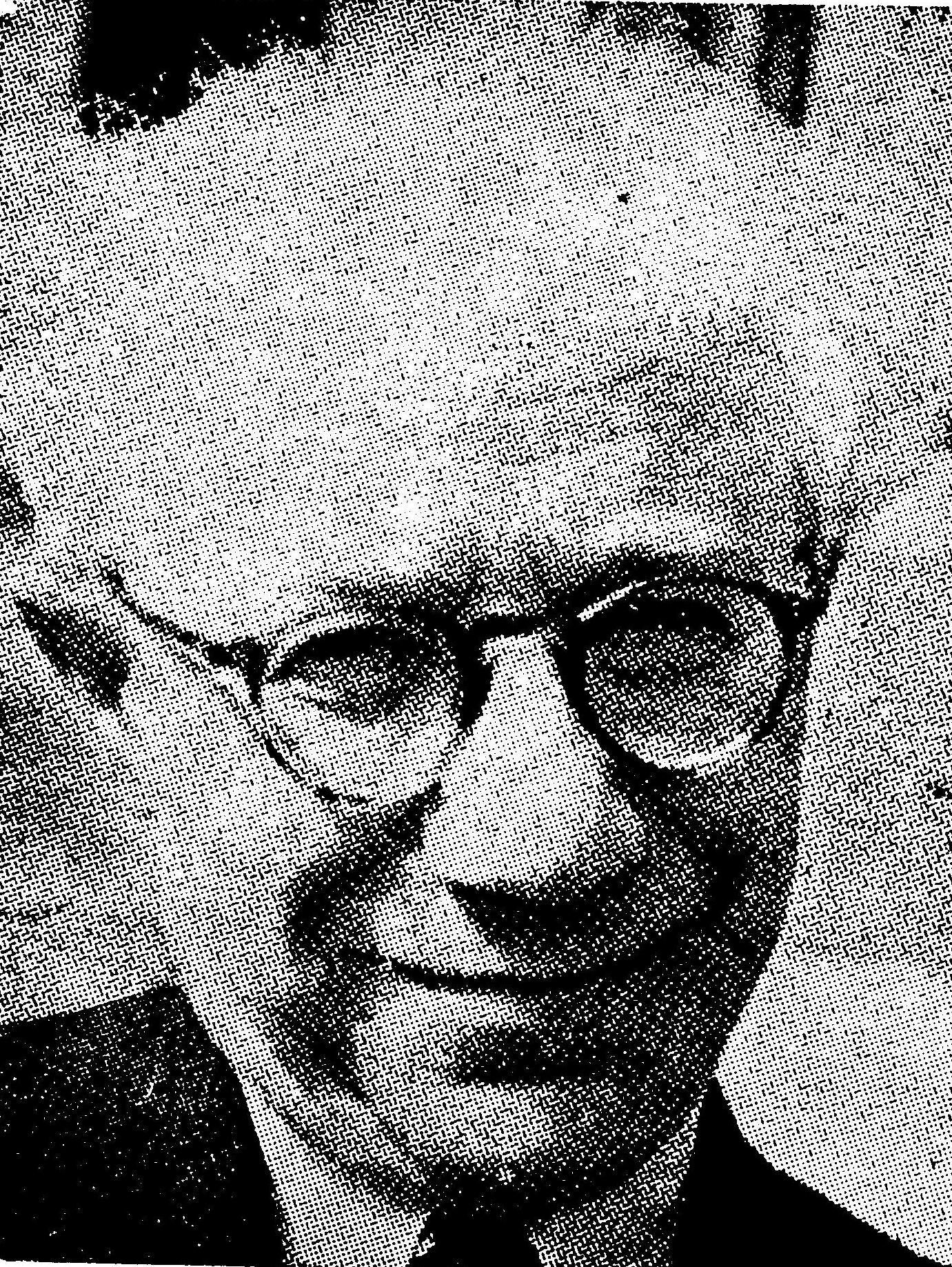
- Born: 1887; Smorgon
- Died: August 1964 (aged 77); Tel Aviv
- Occupation: Writer

Abba Lvovich Gordin (Hebrew: אבא גורדין; 1887–1964) was a Belarusian anarchist and Yiddish writer and poet.

== Early life and career ==
Abba Gordin was born in 1887 in Smorgon (now in Belarus) to Rabbi Yehuda Leib Gordin of Łomża and Khaye Ester Sore Gordin (née Miller). As a teenager, he organized a strike by apprentice tailors in Ostrów, disseminated radical propaganda in Kreslavka (Krāslava) and Dvinsk (Daugavpils), and was briefly imprisoned after taking part in the abortive revolution of 1905–1906, having led demonstrators to storm the jail and free political prisoners in Vilkomir. He and his brother Wolf (Ze'ev), who were at that time affiliated with the labor-Zionist youth movement Tseirei Tsion, broke from their father's religion after their mother's death in 1907.

In 1908, Abba and Wolf Gordin opened a secular Hebrew school, "Ivria," where they experimented with a unique form of libertarian pedagogy. To teach a modern, secular Hebrew, they believed, required teaching methods that were concrete and active, involving the body. They founded their own publishing house, "Novaya Pedagogika" (New Pedagogy), to publish their theory and methodology.

Migrating to Moscow with other refugees during World War I, he and Wolf (under the collective title of the "Brat'ya Gordinii," the Gordin Brothers) joined the editorial staff of the influential newspaper, Anarkhiia, published from 1917 to 1918. There, they published a series of works delineating the principles of "Pan-Anarchism," a form of anarchism intended to address the distinctive problems and aspirations of "the Oppressed Five":

The "Oppressed Five" referred to those categories of humanity which endured the greatest hardships under the yoke of Western civilization: "worker-vagabond," national minority, woman, youth, and individual personality. Five basic institutions – the state, capitalism, colonialism, the school, and the family – were held responsible for their sufferings. The Gordins worked out a philosophy which they called "Pan-Anarchism" and which prescribed five remedies for the five baneful institutions that tormented the five oppressed elements of modern society. The remedies for the state and capitalism were, simply enough, statelessness and communism; for the remaining three oppressors, however, the antidotes were rather more novel: "cosmism" (the universal elimination of national persecution), "gyneantropism" (the emancipation and humanization of women), and "pedism" (the liberation of the young from "the vise of slave education").

As tensions mounted between Russian anarchists and Bolsheviks, Abba Gordin attempted to make peace with the Bolshevik government, founding an "Anarchist-Universalist" tendency among the anarchists that was willing to postpone the abolition of the State. A Communist Party Central Committee memo of 1921 noted that the All-Russian Section of Anarchist-Universalists was "one of the most peaceful in the Anarchist movement," as it "recognizes 'workers' parliamentarism' as represented by the Soviet government" and "finds [it] necessary to participate in the work of the Soviet apparatus, to uphold the Red Army, the civil war and the dictatorship of the proletariat as the transitional form toward Anarchy." Nonetheless, both Gordin and the Anarchist-Universalists faced increasing government persecution. Observers attributed this persecution to Gordin's relative popularity among Russia's radical working class. In Seventy Days In Russia: What I Saw (1924), Angel Pestaña, recounting his visit to Moscow in 1920, notes that Abba Gordin, the "most visible spokesperson" among those anarchists who were "inclined to accept centralism and the dictatorship of the proletariat," had been imprisoned for three months in the notorious Butyrka prison "for the crime of having been elected to the Moscow Soviet by the workers of the factory where he worked":

Gordin was a worker in a munitions factory. When the elections for the Soviet of the district that his factory belonged to were held, despite the fact that the communists always allowed only their nominees on the election list for the Soviet and did not allow any of their candidates to be defeated, the workers in the factory where Gordin worked chose him instead of the communist nominee. When the votes were counted at the Soviet headquarters, and it was discovered that a communist was not selected and that Gordin was chosen instead, the Soviet exercised its veto powers and annulled the election, but only with regard to this particular delegate, and not with regard to the communists who were elected during that same proceeding.

After the election was repeated with the same result and subsequently nullified three times, Gordin was jailed and the munitions factory denied representation. Alexander Berkman reports that it was only on May 25, 1920, after some 1,500 Butyrka prisoners refused to eat, that Gordin was released "by order of the Tcheka, in the hope of breaking the hunger strike."

In 1925, speaking at a public event, Abba Gordin was shot and then arrested by the Cheka; only the personal intercession of Lenin's wife won his release. Abba and his wife, Voronina, fled across the Manchurian border, making their way to Shanghai.

== Exile ==
Abba Gordin emigrated to the United States in 1927 where he wrote books, essays, and poems in several languages. He later established the Jewish Ethical Society. Gordin became a co-editor of the New York Yiddish-language anarchist journal Freie Arbeiter Stimme and editor of his own polemic periodical, The Clarion. By the early 1930s, Gordin had identified nationalism as a more prominent driver of modern history than social class conflict. He also critiqued Marxist doctrine as a "hybrid ... of quasi-religion and pseudo-science" that would depose one king for another.

Around 1957, he emigrated to Israel, where he translated his Yiddish writing into Hebrew. Gordin died in Tel Aviv in 1964. Services were held August 23.

== Works ==
=== Sole authorship ===
==== In Russian ====
- Anarkhizm-universalizm: K obosnovaniyu programmy [Anarchism-Universalism: On the Rationale for the Program] (1920)
- Ot yuridicheskogo anarkhizma k fakticheskomu [From Legal to Actual Anarchism] (1920)
- Deklaratsiya Moskovskoy organizatsii anarkho-universalistov: K vos'momu s"yezdu Sovetov [Declaration of the Moscow Organization of Anarcho-Universalists: To the Eighth Congress of Soviets] (1921)
- Interindividualizm [Interindividualism] (1922)
- Egotika: Stikhi [Egoism: Poems] (1922)

==== In Yiddish ====
- Printsipn un tsvekn-derklerung fun der yidishe etisher gezelshaft [Statement of the Principles And Aims of the Jewish Ethical Society] (1936)
- Idishe etik [Jewish Ethics] (1937)
- Grunt-printsipn fun idishkayt [Founding Principles of Jewishness] (1938)
- Idisher velt-banem [The Jewish World-View] (1939)
- Di froy un di bibl [Woman And The Bible] (1939)
- Moral in Idishn lebn [Morality In Jewish Life] (1940)
- Sotsiale obergloyberay un kritik [Social Superstitions And Criticism] (1941)
- Di yesoydes fun der gezelshaft [The Foundations Of Society] (1942)
- Undzer banem [Our Conception] (1946)
- Di sotsiale frage [The Social Question] (1940)
- Denker un dikhter (eseyen) [Thinker And Poet: Essays] (1949)
- Eseyen (diskusyes un kharakteristikes) [Essays (Discussions And Characterisations)] (1951)
- Zikhroynes un khezsboynes (memuarn fun der rusisher revolutsye 1917–1924). [Memories And Assessments: Memoirs Of The Russian Revolution] (vol. 1: 1955, vol. 2: 1957)
- In gerangl far frayhayt bukh ayns: Rusland 1773–75, bukh tsvay: Rusland 1917–1919 [In Struggle For Freedom. Book One: Russia 1773–75, Book Two: Russia 1917–19] (1956)
- Sh. Yanovsky (1864–1939): zayn lebn, kemfn un shafn [Sh. Yanovsky (1864–1939): His Life, Struggles And Works] (1957)
- Yidish lebn in Amerike (in shpigl fun F. Bimkos verk) [Jewish life In America (As Reflected In F. Bimko's Work)] (1957)
- Draysik yor in Lite un Poyln (oytobiografye) [Thirty Years In Lithuania And Poland (Autobiography)] (1958)
- Shloyme hamelekh: historisher roman [King Solomon: Historical Novel] (1960)

==== In English ====
- Communism Unmasked (1940) OCLC 1840344

=== With Wolf (Ze'ev) Gordin ===
==== In Hebrew ====
- Seferot ha-Iledim (Tarbut Akhrunah) [Children’s Literature (Recent Culture)] (1907)
- Maktav galvi el mukiri ha-Khanukka [An Open Letter to the National Cherishers of Hanukkah] (1909)
- Gan Tiatruni l’iledim 5–4 am tvi niginah [Theatrical Garden for 5–4 Year Olds With Musical Notes] (1910)
- Ha-Sderot Ha-Iledim [The Order of Children] (1913)

==== In Yiddish ====
- A megile tsu di yidn in goles [A Book for the Jews in Diaspora] (1909)
- Undzere khiburim (Our Treatises) (1912)
- Fonetishe ortografye (Phonetic Orthography) (1913)
- Undzer kheder (Our Schoolroom) (1913)
- Der yung-mentsh oder der finf-bund: a dramatishe shir in 5 akten [The Young Person or the Group of Five: A Dramatic Poem in Five Acts] (1913)
- Triumfedye: dramatishe shir in finf akten [Triumphant: A Dramatic Comedy in Five Acts] (1914)

==== In Russian ====
- Sistema Material’noy i Otnositel’noy Yestestvennosti [The Systems of Material and Relative Naturalism] (1909)
- Besedy s anarkhistom-filosofom [Conversation With an Anarchist Philosopher] (1918)
- Sotsiomagiya i sotsiotekhnika, ili Obshcheznakharstvo i obshchestroitel'stvo [Sociomagic and Sociotechnics, or Generalized Quackery Versus Global Construction] (1918)
- Anarkhiya dukha (Blagovest bezumiya) [Anarchy of the Spirit (The Gospel of Madness)] (1919)
- Pedagogika molodezhi ili Reproduktina. Ch. 1: Kritika shkoly [Pedagogy of Youth or Reproduction. Part 1: Critique of the school] (1919)
- Rechi anarkhista [Anarchist Speech] (1919)
- Anarkhiia v Mechte: Strana Anarkhiia: Utopiia-poema [Anarchy in a Dream: The Land of Anarchy: Utopia-Poem] (1919)

=== With Hanoch Levin ===
- Smorgon, Mehoz Vilna: Sefer ’edut Ve-Zikaron (1965)

== See also ==
- Anarchism in Israel
- Anarchism in Russia
- Anarchism in the United States
