= Black Guards =

Army/faction in the Russian Civil War

- Чёрная гвардия, Chjornaya gvardiya
- Black flags were used by guards in several modifications and variations
- Leaders: Various militia leaders, including Maria Nikiforova, Lev Chernyi, Mikhail Uralov, Fedir Shchus and Nestor Makhno
- Dates active: Summer 1917–Spring 1919 (became core units of the Revolutionary Insurgent Army of Ukraine by mid 1919)
- Active regions: Russia, Russian SFSR and Ukraine
- Ideology: Anarchism (primarily anarcho-communism)
- Wars: Russian Revolution of 1917 and Russian Civil War

Black Guards (Russian: Чёрная гвардия, romanized: Chjornaya gvardiya) were armed groups of workers formed after the February Revolution and before the final Bolshevik suppression of other left-wing groups. They were the main strike force of the anarchists. They were created in the Summer of 1917 in Ukraine by Maria Nikiforova, and expanded in January 1918 to Moscow, under the control of anarchists at industrial enterprises by Factory and Plant Committees and by Moscow Federation of Anarchist Groups cells.

== History ==
=== Origin ===
Russian anarchists opposed the creation of a regular Red Army with the call "To arms!" and the widespread organization of rebel committees with the aim of total arming of the populace. The anarchist press of Petrograd, Moscow and other large centers carried out massive agitation with the aim of creating free fighting squads of the "Black Guard". As the newspaper Burevestnik, the organ of the Petrograd Federation, wrote:

“Those gentlemen are cruelly mistaken, thinking that the real revolution is already over, that now all that remains is to consolidate those disgusting gains that went to the working people. No! The real revolution, the social revolution, the liberator of the working people of all countries, is just beginning.”

Maria Nikiforova organized the Black Guards' first unit. Nikiforova, often known by her nickname Marusya, was a Ukrainian anarchist organiser who put together the first Black Guards cell in the city of Alexandrovsk in Ukraine. Nikiforova started the first Black Guards cell in an attempt to force land reform and wealth redistribution to fruition. Nikiforova, a self-proclaimed terrorist, directed her unit of Black Guards to terrorize the Alexandrovsk local government in order to achieve the political change she desired. Later similar cells were established by Nestor Makhno throughout other portions of Ukraine. Makhno, during the revolution, seized land and distributed wealth among the peasants.

The strength of the Black Guard quickly grew, which was noted, in particular, by the Deputy Chairman of the Cheka Jēkabs Peterss. In addition, by March 1918, anarchists controlled 25 mansions in Moscow, and some of them were located near strategically important points of the city. Since the relations between the allies in the revolutionary camp, the Bolsheviks and the anarchists, were gradually aggravated, they prepared for future clashes. According to the Cheka, an anarchist action against the Bolsheviks was scheduled for April 18, (Note: The anarchists constantly denied these rumors, claiming that they intended to act together with the Red Guards and the Red Army against the White Army.) and therefore it was decided to launch a preemptive strike, disarming the Black Guard units.

=== Suppression in Russia ===
On the night of April 11, 1918, Felix Dzerzhinsky, director of the Cheka, had a force of approximately 5,000 Soviet troops attack the anarchist headquarters in Moscow. Anarchists returned fire, with the help of artillery, but the Bolsheviks suppressed resistance on Donskaya Street and entered into a firefight on Povarskaya Street. The last stronghold of the Black Guard was the Zeitlin mansion, which was taken by 12 noon, and in general, the fighting between the forces of the Cheka and the anarchists stopped by 2 PM. As a result of this operation, the Bolsheviks killed 40 anarchists, some of whom were shot on the spot. In addition, 10 to 12 security officers and soldiers were killed in the fighting.

Recalling these events, the Russian anarchist Vsevolod Volin wrote in his book The Unknown Revolution:

[O]n the night of April 12, under a false and absurd pretext, [the quarters of] all the Anarchist organizations in Moscow — and principally those of the Federation of Anarchist Groups in that city — were attacked and sacked by troops and the police force. For several hours the capital took on the appearance of a city in a state of siege. Even artillery took part in the “action”.

This operation served as a signal for the sacking of the libertarian organizations in nearly all the important cities of Russia. And as always the provincial authorities exceeded in zeal those in the capital.

Leon Trotsky, who for two weeks had prepared the blow, and who had carried out in person, among the regiments, an unbridled agitation against the “anarcho-bandits”, had the satisfaction of being able to make his famous declaration: “At last the Soviet government, with an iron broom, has rid Russia of Anarchism.”

After the defeat of the Black Guard in Moscow, a search was carried out of the mansions seized from the anarchists, in some of which gold was found. The Moscow Federation of Anarchist Groups was accused of having links with criminals and about 500 people were arrested. At the same time, Dzerzhinsky, commenting on what happened, noted:

We in no way had in mind and did not want to fight the ideological anarchists. And at the present time, we are releasing all the ideological anarchists who were detained on the night of April 12, and if, perhaps, some of them will be brought to justice, it will only be for covering up crimes committed by criminal elements that have infiltrated anarchist organizations. There are very few ideological anarchists among the people detained by us, and only a few among hundreds.”

The events in Moscow were the signal for the beginning of the struggle in the regions. On the morning of April 12, in the town of Gorodets, the anarchists, headed by the chairman of the city council, began a struggle against the Bolsheviks. With the support of armored cars, they captured Novocherkassk and began to hunt down the Bolsheviks. The center of the anarchists in the Volga region was Samara, where during the April “disarmament” the detachments managed to hide their weapons. At the end of April, the Samara Black Guard "flying" detachment of Smorodinov (made up of 600 militants with armored cars) captured the city of Buguruslan. The struggle of the anarchists against the Bolsheviks in the Volga region lasted all April and May. In Kursk, the anarchists revolted and held the city on April 10-29, 1918. On May 9, the Commissariat of Internal Affairs sent a directive to all provincial Soviets: “The experience of Moscow, Petrograd and other cities has proved that hooligans, thieves, robbers and counter-revolutionaries are hiding behind the flag of anarchist organizations, they are secretly preparing the overthrow of Soviet power... Disarm all the squads and organizations of the anarchists. Anyone can have a weapon only with the permission of the local Soviets" (Izvestia No. 91, 05/10/18). However, on May 17, the anarchists, in alliance with the maximalists, spearheaded a new uprising in Samara. The remaining presence of the Black Guards was significantly weakened by their own internal divisions and lack of organization. Russian revolutionary writer Victor Serge, who was initially part of anarchist movement, believed that much of the Black Guards real capacities was "wasted on small and chaotic struggles."

=== Militarization in Ukraine ===
Ultimately the legacy of the Black Guards was its serving as a model for the Revolutionary Insurgent Army of Ukraine. Following the Treaty of Brest-Litovsk, Nestor Makhno formed a Black Guards unit in Ukraine that would later grow into what was formally known as the Revolutionary Insurgent Army of Ukraine (RIAU). The RIAU may have been considered a continuation of the Black Guards if it were not on a far larger, more organized, and unified scale.

== Characteristics of the Black Guard ==
The anarchists understood that criminals, people who were not tested for reliability, would only harm them, especially since the situation was heating up. Therefore, unreliable people were purged from the ranks of the Black Guard, and admissions standards raised. On April 4, a request was received from the headquarters of the Black Guard to provide lists of all persons belonging to the Moscow Federation of Anarchist Groups. Militants were only admitted to the Black Guard on the recommendation of either local groups; three members of the Federation; Factory committees; or District Councils.

The Black Guard was created as an alternative to traditional army structures, and it set about training detachments that could operate in partisan conditions. Instead of a disciplined integral army, the anarchists created a number of disciplined squads, acting not in formation, not in open battle, not by military etiquette, but by guerrilla detachments of raiders and terrorists. These detachments were created with the aim of “securing the conquests already taken from the teeth of the bourgeoisie who had gone underground and from the raids of the international gold monopoly in the White Guard uniform.” These units were supposed to replace the militant groups accustomed to operating in tsarist Russia, whose usual practice was expropriation, terrorist acts against the police - "propaganda by the deed" - by forming permanent anarchist units. At the same time, the Black Guard was not supposed to participate in searches, arrests and other similar actions, since this was considered the prerogative of the Red Guard.

== See also ==
- Anarchism in Russia
- Anarchism in Ukraine
- Green Army
- Red Guards

== Bibliography ==
- Азаров В. Черная Гвардия // Автоном No. 20, май 2003. С. 14–15
- Анархисты. Документы и материалы. 1883—1935 гг. В 2 тт. / Т. 2. 1917—1935 гг. — М.: «Российская политическая энциклопедия» (РОССПЭН), 1999.
- Волин В. Неизвестная революция, 1917—1921. — М.: НПЦ «Праксис», 2005.
- Дубовик А. В. Разгром московских анархистов. 12 апреля 1918 г.
- Махно Н. И. Книга вторая. Под ударами контрреволюции // Воспоминания // Азбука анархиста. — М.: Вагриус, 2005
- Шубин А. В. Анархия — мать порядка. Между красными и белыми. — М.: Яуза, Эксмо, 2005.
- Анархистский мятеж в Самаре 17-18 мая 1918 года.
- Электронные копии «Анархии» в путеводителе РНБ «Газеты в сети и вне её»
