= Wolf Gordin =

Russian anarchist and language creator (1885–1974)

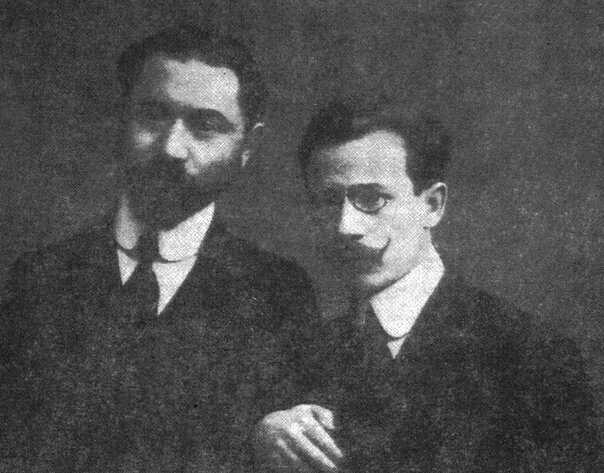
Wolf and Abba Gordin, before 1925

Wolf Leibovich Gordin (Russian: Вольф Лейбович Гордин), or Vladimir Lvovich Gordin (Владимир Львович Гордин; January 1, 1885 – June 2, 1974), also known as Beoby or Beobi, was a Russian anarchist and the creator of a constructed language called AO.

== Early life ==
Born in Mikhalishki, Grodno Governorate, in what is now Belarus, to Rabbi Yehudah Leib Gordin and Khaye Esther Sore (née Miller), elder brother of Abba Gordin, Wolf was influenced by labor Zionist and anarchist ideas as a young man. In 1908, Wolf and Abba Gordin opened Ivria, an experimental cheder, a school for the teaching of secular Hebrew, in the town of Smarhon (within the Vilna Governorate, part of the Russian Empire). Working together, the two brothers created their own educational press, Novaya Pedagogika, writing and publishing numerous pamphlets on pedagogy between 1907 and 1914 as well as a single issue of a Yiddish-language journal, Der yunger yid [Jewish Youth] in Vilna in 1911. Their libertarian teaching philosophy bridged the non-authoritarian style of Leo Tolstoy's school for peasant children at Yasnaya Polyana and the egoism of Max Stirner.

== Revolutionary period ==
When the First World War swept through the region, Wolf and Abba traveled along the Dnieper River through Ukraine, making a living by giving private lessons. The outbreak of the October Revolution of 1917 found Abba in Moscow and Wolf in Petrograd. There, in April 1917, Wolf founded an organization, the Union of the Five Oppressed—a title expressing the combination of struggles against capitalism, conformism, patriarchy, colonialism, and ageism—and became chief editor of the anarchist newspaper Burevestnik (The Petrel) in November, following a split in the editorial collective. Subsequently, Wolf joined his brother in Moscow.

This began a period of intense creativity and revolutionary agitation for Wolf and Abba, who signed their many collaborations in Russian as "the Gordin Brothers" (Brat'ya Gordinii). "They did not so much write books, as 'bake' them, so prolific was their literary output", Boris Yelensky recounts, singling out for special admiration their children's fable, Pochemu? ili Kak muzhik popal v stranu Anarkhiya ("Why": Or, How a Peasant Got Into the Land of Anarchy, 1917). In 1921, the Bolshevik and former anarchist Victor Serge noted that

[t]he two Gordin brothers have played a key role in the Russian anarchist movement of these past few years. Tireless orators and propagandists, prolific writers, journalists, pamphleteers, and initiators of multiple enterprises, combatants at the barricades of July and October 1917, thanks to their ever-working imaginations they have greatly contributed to creating and sustaining both the life and the waste of this movement.

== Pananarchism ==
A "Pananarchist Manifesto" was printed in 1918 by the Moscow Federation of Anarchist Groups under the collective name of the Gordin Brothers; however, Abba Gordin credits Wolf Gordin with its authorship. In keeping with the prefix pan-, in the sense of "all", "pananarchism" was to be "an expanded and articulate anarchism" that encompassed the concerns of the Five Oppressed groups, addressing them via a comprehensive program of communism, individualism, "gynanthropism" (feminism), "cosmism" (or "national cosmopolitanism"), and "pedism" (the liberation of youth via libertarian education). In this sense, the Gordins understood pananarchism as an alternative to Volin's concept of a "synthesis" between different anarchist tendencies.

Pananarchism also entailed an extension of anarchist principles to "everything", including the fields of knowledge and culture: it meant a critique of both religion and science from a "sociotechnical" perspective.

== The Sociotechnicum ==
In 1918, the Gordin Brothers issued a "Declaration of the First Central Sociotechnicum", a manifesto for the creation of "a special institution of social experimentation" dedicated to the proposition that "social apparatuses can be invented, perfected and cultivated artificially". Sociotechnics, as a field of experimental work, rejected the Marxist conception of "social science" but asserted "the need for a sociotechnical attitude to social issues, in other words, the need to admit the same freely building and restructuring, the same free and inventive attitude toward social nature, which humanity, thanks to civilization, has achieved in relation to the physical environment". The Sociotechnicum, as an institution dedicated to sociotechnics, was also intended to "shelter sociotechnicians, i.e., social builders and inventors, from persecution both by those in power and by public opinion".

In 1919, the Gordin Brothers were interrogated in connection with the September 25th bombing of the Moscow Committee of the Russian Communist Party in Leontiev Lane. Wolf Gordin's manuscript for a book on "Sociophilosophy" was seized by the Cheka. Cheka director Felix Dzerzhinsky, after "a long personal conversation with the Gordins," decided that "both they and their 'Social-Technicum' group had neither taken part, nor even knew about the impending assassination attempt on the Mosc. Com. RCP [Moscow Committee of the Russian Communist Party]... Their 'Social-Technicum' is 10–12 communist sectarians who have renounced private property".

== AO ==
After 1919, Wolf Gordin and Abba Gordin ceased to write collaboratively, and Wolf pursued his interest in what Serge called "the idée fixe of a universal language of which he is the inventor and which is written in numbers, the language AO."

Wolf's concept for a "cosmic" language—not only an "international language" like Esperanto, but a genuinely universal "language of humanity"—first emerged in his fictional writing in collaboration with Abba. In Strana Anarkhiia (utopiya-poema) (The Land of Anarchy: Utopia-Poem, 1919), five refugees representing the Five Oppressed (Self, Worker, Woman, Oppressed Nation, and Youth) are guided by an unnamed person, "the man from the Land of Anarchy". In their "pan-technical" utopia, technology has so completely overcome the difference between nature and artifice that "[t]he winds and thunderstorms and storms and thunder and lightning obey us", the guide explains, but then clarifies:

I only figuratively put it: "obedient". There can be no talk of any obedience, since there is no command in the land of Anarchy. In our language there is no imperative [povelitel'nogo], but only an intercessory [prositel'noye, "pleading" or "prayer"]... You had lying, hypocrisy, flattery; these three forces weakened, defiled, destroyed the word. We do not have them, and the word has recuperated. It works wonders for us. But, I repeat, we have no commands, no orders, only requests [pros'ba].

The name AO, according to Sergei N. Kuznetsov, literally just means "invention": the phoneme "A" signifies the verb, "to invent", and the "O" forms a suffix used for substantives. As such, it forms part of a "philosophy of invention", of "pan-inventism" or "All-Invention". In Grammatika logicheskogo yazyka AO (The Grammar of the Logical Language AO), Wolf Gordin writes that

[t]he first and primary basis of modern economics and ideology, technology and culture, is invention. It is not the noun, found ready-made, that drives civilization, but the verb, the invention realized in tools and machines. The verb itself, in AO, is therefore no longer a verb, but an invention... "A" is therefore symbolized by the sign '✕,' since invention alone multiplies social wealth.

For this reason, Wolf sought to sharply distinguish AO from other constructed languages, especially Esperanto. In a 1920 pamphlet, Gordin urged his readers to "[b]oycott natural languages, national, state, and international", denouncing Esperanto (which had been designed on the basis of European languages) as merely "the language of 'international' European imperialism". One distinguishing mark was its orthography: AO was written entirely in numerical symbols. Wolf revised his design for AO in 1924, retaining the use of numerals for consonants but using mathematical operators for vowels.

AO's "logical" character was signaled by its simplicity and consistency: Gordin boasted that because of the "economy of the sounds, only eleven", used to form its words, it would be more easily acquired than any other language, "truly accessible to all of Humanity and (by this alone) worthy of the name 'The Language of Humanity.'" Moreover, AO's phonetics had been designed in accordance with its semantics, so that each basic sound stood for a fundamental concept.

Two versions of AO: before and after 1924
Sounds	Signs		Meanings
	AO-1	AO-2	
Vowels			
а (ah)	'1	✕ [multiplication sign]	invention
э (eh)	'2	+ [plus, addition sign]	affirmation
о (oh)	'3	0 [zero]	nullity/natural (noun)
и (ee)	'4	√ [root sign]	property (adjective)
у (oo)	'5	– [minus sign]	negation
Consonants			
з (z)	0 [zero]	%	(representing qualitative "scales": 5 means ascension or extension, % descent or division)
б (b)	1	1	(representing qualitative "scales": 5 means ascension or extension, % descent or division)
ц (ts)	2	2	(representing qualitative "scales": 5 means ascension or extension, % descent or division)
д (d)	3	3	(representing qualitative "scales": 5 means ascension or extension, % descent or division)
ф (f)	4	4	(representing qualitative "scales": 5 means ascension or extension, % descent or division)
ль (l)	[missing]	5	(representing qualitative "scales": 5 means ascension or extension, % descent or division)
т (t)	5	[missing]	(representing qualitative "scales": 5 means ascension or extension, % descent or division)

By methodically combining these signs, the speaker of AO could, in theory, spell out anything conceivable.

== The Association of Inventors-Inventists ==
The AO language formed part of Wolf Gordin's overall "Philosophy of Invention" or "Inventist Philosophy". A further extension of Gordin's "Inventism" was the founding of the Association of Inventors-Inventists (the Assotsiatsiyey izobretateley-inventistov or AIIZ), with its headquarters located at 68 Tverskaya Street in Moscow. Members of the AIIZ adopted AO as their language, giving themselves new names in this idiom:

Members of the Association of Inventors-Inventists4+51√4041√3√41√
Russian name	AO name spelled in AO-2	AO name spelled in the English alphabet	Meaning of AO name
Wolf Lvovich Gordin	1+01√	Beobi	Society-Me ("Human")
Alexander Sergeevich Suvorov	√2✕1√	Ibtsabi	Invent yourself
Georgy Andreevich Polevoi
Efalbi	Universal		
Ivan Stepanovich Belyaev	5+3051√	Leedolbi	Seeing the fulfillment of his hopes
Olga Viktorovna Kholoptseva
Efofbi	Citizen of the universe		
Zakhar Grigorievich Piatetski
Edifby			
Efim Moiseevich Serzhanov	1√✕+51√	Biaelby	
Shvil'pe	1√✕1√	Biabi	

In 1925, after posting anti-government material in the window of the AIIZ headquarters, Gordin was arrested and subjected to a forensic psychiatric examination. Serzhanov and Suvorov went on a hunger strike to protest Gordin's detention, demanding that he be allowed to travel to Mexico to lecture on AO and sociotechnics. Soon afterward, Gordin fled the country, making his way to the United States.

The AIIZ continued its activities after Wolf Gordin went into exile. In 1927, in honor of the tenth anniversary of the Russian Revolution and Konstantin Tsiolkovskii's seventieth birthday, the AIIZ curated an international exhibit of designs for interplanetary vehicles. Included in the exhibit was a massive display explaining the AO language.

== Exile ==
Wolf Gordin arrived in the United States in January 1926. From this point on, the existing biographical information is highly incomplete. The historian Paul Avrich writes that after his 1925 arrest, Wolf Gordin "fled to America and became, mirabile dictu, a Protestant missionary", attributing this to "a reliable source". Others allege that he became a Trotskyite. However, these may be in error, perhaps confusing Wolf with his younger brother, Morris Gordin, whose disenchantment with the Soviet Union, after his early involvement in Bolshevism, led him to Trotskyism and then to a religious conversion to Protestantism and missionary work. Moreover, Wolf Gordin continued to speak in anarchist circles and publish in anarchist journals in the years of his exile.

In the 1930s, Wolf Gordin contributed a number of articles, signed with his AO name "W. Beoby," to his brother's English-language anarchist journal, The Clarion, and to E. Armand's French-language anarchist journal, L'En-Dehors. These further developed the philosophical tenets of his "Inventism", which he connected with the process philosophy of Alfred North Whitehead and the pragmatism of William James.

== Works ==
=== Sole authorship ===
==== In Russian ====
- Brat'ya Gordiny [Wolf Gordin]. Manifest Pananarkhistov. Moscow: Malyy sekretariat Sev. obl. soyuza anarkhistov, 1918. [Pananarchist Manifesto] (1918)
- Gordin, V. L. [Wolf]. 4'3'5 4'2'4'11 130'12'3'3. [What is the Language "AO"?] (1920)
- Gordin, Wolf. AO-russkiy grammaticheskiy slovar [AO-Russian Grammatical Dictionary] (1920)
- 1'2'31'4/Beobi [Wolf Gordin]. 1'20'12, '523'3 1'5'45'42'4,,'5 ,,'1'3'4 Grammatika yazyka chelovechestva «AO». Perevod s «AO» [Grammar of the Language of Humanity "AO". Translated from "AO"] (1920)
- 1'2'31'4/Веоbi (Wolf Gordin). 0'126'6'S33'5'22 1'2'1'15'41'3. '1'3 — '241'. AO-russkiy slovar' chelovechestvo-izobretatelya [AO-Russian Dictionary of Inventor-Humanity] (1920)
- Beobi ("Byvsh. V. Gordin — pbrat'ya Gordiny" [formerly W. Gordin of the Gordin Brothers]). Plan Chelovechestva (Vnegosudarstveshshkhov-Vseizobretateley) [The Plan of Mankind (Non-Statist All-Inventors)] (1921)
- Beobi [Wolf Gordin]. Izobret-pitaniye (kak vykhod iz vsekh sovremennykh tupikov-razrukh i kak put' k bessmertiyu) [Invention-Nutrition as a Way Out of All Modern Impasses of Devastation and as a Path to Immortality] (1921)
- +4✕–0 [Efayuo] / All-Inventive [Gordin, Volf L.]. Grammatika logicheskogo yazyka AO (na obl.: Grammatika panmetodologicheskogo yazyka AO) [The Grammar of the Logical Language AO (title page: The Grammar of the Pan-Methodological Language AO)]. Pub. author, Moscow, 68 Tverskaya Street, 5th year for the invention of the language of mankind AO (7th year of the October revolution) (1924)
- Gordiny, br. / Gordin V. [begun with Abba Gordin in 1919; completed by Wolf in 1924]. Teoriya poznaniya i anarkhiya poznaniya [Theory of Knowledge and the Anarchy of Knowledge]. Title page: Beobi, Gnoseologiya: Vvedeniye vo vseizobretatel'stvo [Beobi [W. Gordin], Gnoseology: Introduction to Invention] Vol. 1 (1924)

==== In English ====
- Gordin, Wolf. "'Inventism,' or the Philosophy of Invention" (1924)
- Gordin, V. L. [Wolf Lvovich]. Inventism or Eurologism, Being the Teaching of Invention. Moscow: The All-Invention House, 1925.
- Gordin, W[olf]. "The Philosophy of Relativity." The Journal of Philosophy, vol. 23, no. 19, 1926, pp. 517–524. JSTOR, www.jstor.org/stable/2013875.
- Gordin, Wolf. "Lenin As I Knew Him." The Reflex (1927).
- Gordin, William Wolf Beoby. Creation or Evolution, or World-Invention. Roscoe, Calif.: The Inventist, 1931.
- Beoby, W. "The Task of Man." The Clarion, Vol. 1, No. 1 (September 1932): 14–15.
- Beoby, W. "The Sphinx Of Philosophy." The Clarion, Vol. 1, No. 2 (October 1932): 10–12.
- Beoby, W. "Chaos and Cosmos." The Clarion, Vol. 1, No. 4 (December 1932): 6–8.
- Beoby, W. "World-Invention." The Clarion, Vol. 2, No. 2 (December 1933): 9–11.
- Beobi, Bibi. The Plight of the Woman and the Rape of Truth: (The Inventist-Temporarist-Everybodist-Nikedist-Feminist Manifesto) (1973).

==== In French ====
- Beoby, W. [Wolf Gordin]. "Du chaos à l'universelle invention." L'en dehors, No. 270 (May 1934): 110–111.
- Beoby [Wolf Gordin]. "L'individu." L'en dehors, No. 279 (Feb. 1935): 247–248.
- Beoby [Wolf Gordin]. "Qu'est-ce que la societe?" L'en dehors, No. 284–285 (July–Aug. 1935): 23–24.

=== With Abba Gordin ===
==== In Hebrew ====
- Seferot ha-Iledim (Tarbut Akhrunah) [Children's Literature (Recent Culture)] (1907)
- Maktav galvi el mukiri ha-Khanukka [An Open Letter to the National Cherishers of Hanukkah] (1909)
- Gan Tiatruni l'iledim 5–4 am tvi niginah [Theatrical Garden for 5–4 Year Olds With Musical Notes] (1910)
- Ha-Sderot Ha-Iledim [The Order of Children] (1913)

==== In Yiddish ====
- A megile tsu di yidn in goles [A Book for the Jews in Diaspora] (1909)
- Undzere khiburim (Our Treatises) (1912)
- Fonetishe ortografye (Phonetic Orthography) (1913)
- Undzer kheder (Our Schoolroom) (1913)
- Der yung-mentsh oder der finf-bund: a dramatishe shir in 5 akten [The Young Person or the Group of Five: A Dramatic Poem in Five Acts] (1913)
- Triumfedye: dramatishe shir in finf akten [Triumphant: A Dramatic Comedy in Five Acts] (1914)

==== In Russian ====
- Sistema Material'noy i Otnositel'noy Yestestvennosti [The Systems of Material and Relative Naturalism] (1909)
- Pochemu? ili Kak muzhik popal v stranu Anarkhiya ["Why": Or, How a Peasant Got Into the Land of Anarchy] (1917)
- Besedy s anarkhistom-filosofom [Conversation With an Anarchist Philosopher] (1918)
- Sotsiomagiya i sotsiotekhnika, ili Obshcheznakharstvo i obshchestroitel'stvo [Sociomagic and Sociotechnics, or Generalized Quackery Versus Global Construction] (1918)
- Anarkhiya dukha (Blagovest bezumiya) [Anarchy of the Spirit (The Gospel of Madness)] (1919)
- Pedagogika molodezhi ili Reproduktina. Ch. 1: Kritika shkoly [Pedagogy of Youth or Reproduction. Part 1: Critique of the school] (1919)
- Rechi anarkhista [Anarchist Speech] (1919)
- Anarkhiia v Mechte: Strana Anarkhiia: Utopiia-poema [Anarchy in a Dream: The Land of Anarchy: Utopia-Poem] (1919)
