= The Russian Anarchists =

1967 book by Paul Avrich

- First edition
- Author: Paul Avrich
- Subject: European history, political philosophy
- Published: 1967 (Princeton University Press)
- Pages: 303
- ISBN: 978-0-691-00766-3

The Russian Anarchists is a history book by Paul Avrich about the Russian anarchist movement from the 19th century to the Bolshevik revolution.
