= Burevestnik =

Burevestnik (буревестник - Russian for storm petrel) may refer to:

== Newspapers ==
- Burevestnik (1906), a Russian anarchist newspaper published in Paris
- Burevestnik (Minsk, 1917), a newspaper published daily from Minsk, Belarus
- Burevestnik (Petrograd, 1917), a Russian anarchist newspaper
- Burevestnik (Tiflis, 1917), a Russian language Bolshevik newspaper published from Tbilisi, Georgia
- Burevestnik (1920), a Russian language anarchist periodical issued from Odesa, Ukraine
- Burevestnik (1921), a Russian language anarchist periodical published in New York City

== Military ==
- 9M730 Burevestnik, a Russian nuclear-powered nuclear-armed cruise missile
- Russian submarine Burevestnik, a 1915 Bars class submarine of the Imperial Russian Navy
- Burevestnik-class frigate, a ship class of the Russian Navy
- Burevestnik Central Scientific Research Institute, a Russian arms industry company based in Nizhny Novgorod
- Burevestnik Airport, a military air base on the Kuril Islands, Russia

== Sports ==
- Burevestnik (sports society), sports society in the USSR
- Burevestnik (Ukraine), sports society in the Ukrainian SSR
- FC Burevestnik Tomsk, Russia
- FC Burevestnik Kishinev
- FC Burevestnik Saransk

== Other uses ==
- Burevestnik (animated film)
- Burevestnik (Nizhny Novgorod Metro), a station of the Nizhny Novgorod Metro, Russia
- Before the Hurricane (Burevestnik), a 1924 Georgian film
- Burevestnik Cinema, a building in Rostov-on-Don, Russia
- Burevestnik Glacier, a glacier on Pasteur Peninsula, Antarctica

== See also ==
- Burevestnik-24, a Russian experimental civil piston ground-effect vehicle
- "The Song of the Stormy Petrel" (Russian: Песня о Буревестнике), a 1901 poem by Maxim Gorky
