= Stormy Petrel (disambiguation) =

Stormy petrel is an alternate term for Storm petrel, the name for two families of petrels

Stormy Petrel may also refer to:

== People ==
- The Stormy Petrel, nickname for Maxim Gorky (1868–1936), Russian revolutionary writer
- The Stormy Petrel, nickname for Joseph Ray Hodgson (1829—1908), English heroic lifesaver

== Literature and the arts ==
- "The Song of the Stormy Petrel", 1902 poem by Maxim Gorky
- "The Stormy Petrel", 1832 poem by Barry Cornwall
- "Stormy Petrel", 1991 novel by Mary Stewart
- "The Stormy Petrel", 2017 novel by Patrick Harpur
- The Stormy Petrel, 1919 American short film starring Louise Huff
- Stormy Petrel (radio serial), 1948 Australian serial about Captain Bligh
- Stormy Petrel (TV series), 1960 Australian series about Captain Bligh
- The Stormy Petrel, 2010 album by Leatherface
- "Stormy Petrel", 1970 B-side single by Thunderclap Newman
- "The Stormy Petrel", name of a boat in the book How to Break a Dragon's Heart

== Other ==
- "Billy Mitchell, Stormy Petrel of the Air", 2004 biography by Roger D. Miller
- The Stormy Petrels, name for the athletic teams of Oglethorpe University

== See also ==
- Burevestnik (disambiguation), Russian name for the storm petrel
