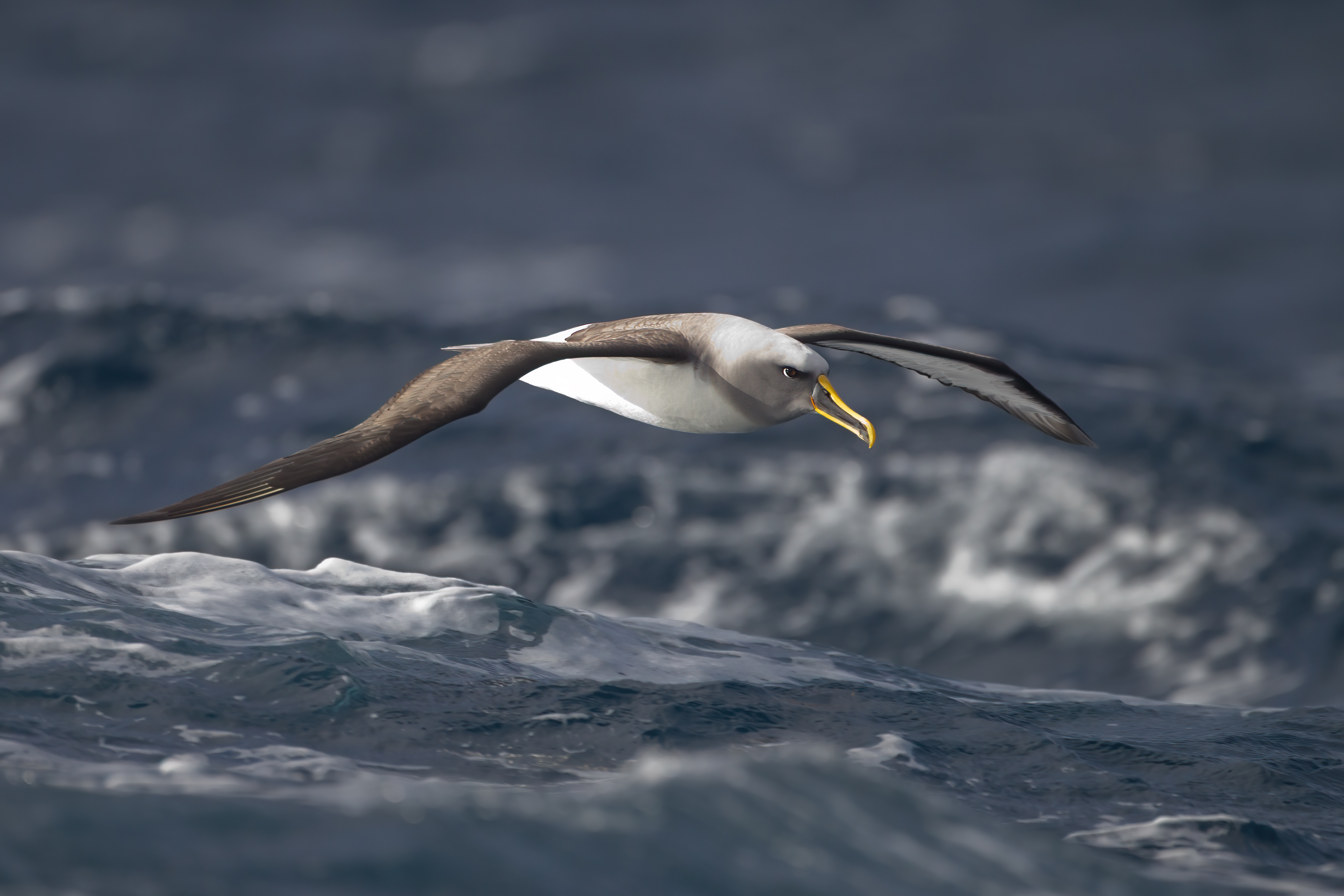
- Buller's albatross (Thalassarche bulleri)

Scientific classification
- Kingdom: Animalia
- Phylum: Chordata
- Class: Aves
- Clade: Austrodyptornithes
- Order: Procellariiformes; Fürbringer, 1888

Families
- †Diomedeoididae; Procellariidae; Diomedeidae; Hydrobatidae; Oceanitidae

Diversity
- 4 extant families, 26 genera, 147 species

= Procellariiformes =

Procellariiformes Temporal range: Eocene–Present Possible Late Cretaceous record

Order of birds

Procellariiformes is an order of seabirds that comprises four families; the albatrosses, the petrels and shearwaters, and two families of storm petrels. Formerly called Tubinares and still called tubenoses in English, Procellariiformes are often referred to collectively as the petrels, a term that has been applied to all members of the order, or more commonly all the families except the albatrosses. They are almost exclusively pelagic (feeding in the open ocean), and have a cosmopolitan distribution across the world's oceans, with the highest diversity being the seas around New Zealand.

Procellariiformes are colonial, mostly nesting on remote, predator-free islands. The larger species nest on the surface, while most smaller species nest in natural cavities and burrows. They exhibit strong philopatry, returning to their natal colony to breed and returning to the same nesting site over many years. Procellariiforms are monogamous and form long-term pair bonds that are formed over several years and may last for the life of the pair. A single egg is laid per nesting attempt, and usually a single nesting attempt is made per year, although the larger albatrosses may only nest once every two years. Both parents participate in incubation and chick rearing. Incubation times are long compared to other birds, as are fledging periods. Once a chick has fledged there is no further parental care. Birds of this order generally have long lifespans spanning multiple decades; the world's oldest known bird, Wisdom, is now around 75 years old.

Procellariiformes have had a long relationship with humans, with the albatrosses in particular have been the subject of numerous cultural depictions. They have been important food sources for many people, and continue to be hunted as such in some parts of the world. Procellariiforms include some of the most endangered bird taxa, with many species threatened with extinction due to introduced predators in their breeding colonies, marine pollution and the danger of fisheries by-catch. Scientists, conservationists, fishermen, and governments around the world are working to reduce the threats posed to them, and these efforts have led to the signing of the Agreement on the Conservation of Albatrosses and Petrels, a legally binding international treaty signed in 2001.

== Nomenclature ==
The name "tubenoses", which may be used to refer to all members of this clade, refers to the "naricorns" or bony nostrils that distinguish these birds from other groups.

The word petrel (first recorded in that spelling 1602) comes from likely earlier (though not recorded until 1676) pitteral or pittrel, and refers to the way the storm petrel patters with its feet over the sea surface. The English explorer William Dampier wrote the bird was so called from its way of flying with its feet just skimming the surface of the water, recalling Saint Peter's walk on the sea of Galilee (Matthew xiv.28), being formed in English as a diminutive of Peter (< Old French: Peterelle (?) < Late Latin: Peterellus < Late Latin: Petrus < Ancient Greek: Πέτρος, romanized: Petros < Ancient Greek: πέτρα, romanized: petra = "stone"); this connection is however due to later speculation.

=== Taxonomy ===
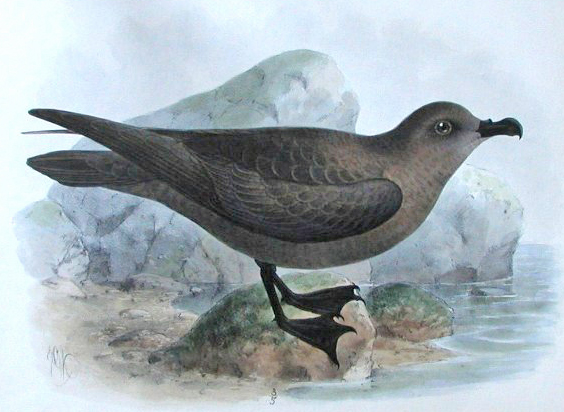
Pterodroma macroptera from Godman's Monograph of the Petrels, 1907–1910

- Procellariiformes
  - Diomedeidae – albatrosses (21 species)
  - - Oceanitidae – austral storm petrels (10 species)
    - - Hydrobatidae – northern storm petrels (18 species)
      - Procellariidae – petrels and shearwaters (100 species)

Phylogeny of the extant procellariforms based on a study by Richard Prum and colleagues published in 2015. The number of species is taken from the list maintained by Frank Gill, Pamela C. Rasmussen and David Donsker on behalf of the International Ornithological Committee (IOC).

The order Procellariiformes was named by German anatomist Max Fürbringer in 1888. The word comes from the Latin word procella, which means a violent wind or a storm, and -iformes for order. Until the beginning of the 20th century, the family Hydrobatidae was named Procellariidae, and the family now called Procellariidae was rendered "Puffinidae". The order itself was called Tubinares. A major early work on this group is Frederick DuCane Godman's Monograph of the Petrels, five fascicles, 1907–1910, with figures by John Gerrard Keulemans.

Phylogenetic studies based on genetics have repeatedly proven this order to be a natural grouping, being monophyletic. In the Sibley-Ahlquist taxonomy, the tubenoses were included in a greatly enlarged order "Ciconiiformes". This taxonomic treatment was almost certainly erroneous, but its assumption of a close evolutionary relationship with other "higher waterbirds" – such as loons (Gaviiformes) and penguins (Sphenisciformes) – appears to be correct. The procellariiforms are most closely related to penguins, having diverged from them about 60 million years ago.

The diving petrels in the genus Pelecanoides were formerly placed in their own family Pelecanoididae. When genetic studies found that they were embedded within the family Procellariidae, the two families were merged.

All the storm petrels were once placed in the family Hydrobatidae but genetic data indicated that Hydrobatidae consisted of two deeply divergent clades that were not sister taxa. In 2018 the austral storm petrels were moved to the new family Oceanitidae. The northern storm petrels in the family Hydrobatidae are more closely related to the family Procellariidae than they are to the austral storm petrels in the family Oceanitidae.

Earlier molecular phylogenetic studies found the family Oceantidae containing the austral storm petrels as the most basal with differing branching topologies for other three families. More recent large-scale studies have found a consistent pattern with the albatross family Diomedeidae as the most basal and Hydrobatidae sister to Procellariidae.

There are 147 living species of procellariiform worldwide, and the order is divided into four extant families, with a fifth prehistorically extinct:

- Family Diomedeidae (albatrosses) are very large seabirds with a large strong hooked bill. They have strong legs, enabling them to walk well on land.
- Family Oceanitidae (Austral storm petrels) are among the smallest seabirds, with fluttering flight and long but weak legs. Most have dark upperparts and a white underside.
- Family Hydrobatidae (northern storm petrels) are similar to the austral storm petrels but have longer more pointed wings and most species have forked tails.
- Family Procellariidae (shearwaters, fulmarine petrels, gadfly petrels, and prions) are a varied group of small or medium-sized seabirds, the largest being the giant petrels. They are heavy for their size, with a high wing loading, so they need to fly fast. Most, except the giant petrels, have weak legs and are nearly helpless on land.
- Family †Diomedeoididae (Early Oligocene – Early Miocene) is an extinct group that had narrow beaks and feet with wide, flat phalanges, especially on the fourth toe.

Fossils of a bird similar to a petrel from the Eocene have been found in the London Clay and in Louisiana. Diving petrels occurred in the Miocene, with a species from that family (Pelecanoides miokuaka) being described in 2007. The most numerous fossils from the Paleogene are those from the extinct family Diomedeoididae, fossils of which have been found in Central Europe and Iran.

== Description ==
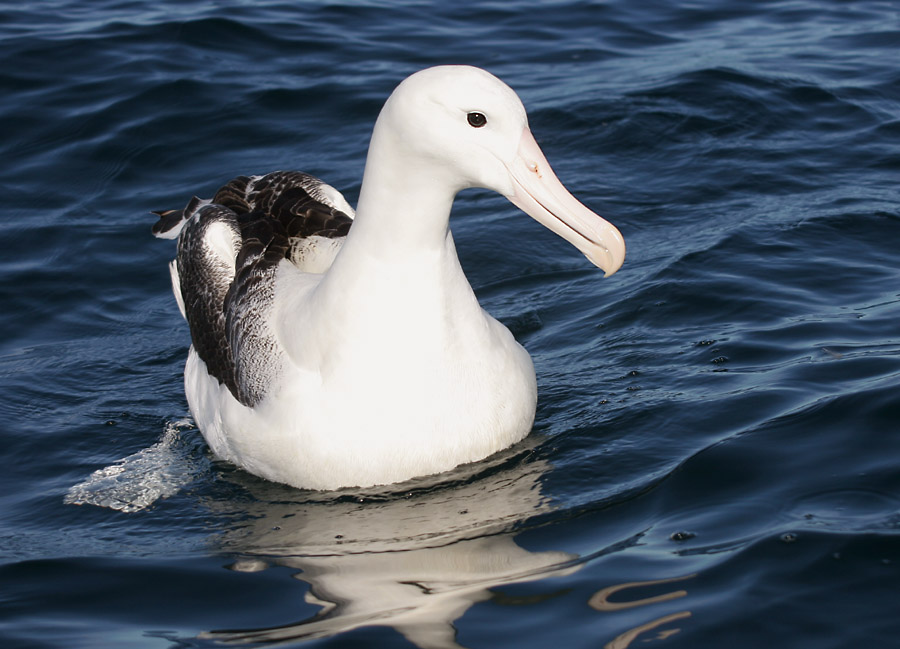
The southern royal albatross is one of the largest of the Procellariiformes.

Procellariiforms range in size from the very large wandering albatross, at 11 kg (24 lb) and a 3.6-metre (12-foot) wingspan, to tiny birds like the least storm petrel, at 20 g (0.71 oz) with a 32-centimetre (13-inch) wingspan, and the smallest of the prions, the fairy prion, with a wingspan of 23 to 28 cm (9.1 to 11.0 in). Their nostrils are enclosed in one or two tubes on their straight deeply-grooved bills with hooked tips. The beaks are made up of several plates. Their wings are long and narrow; the feet are webbed, and the hind toe is undeveloped or non-existent; their adult plumage is predominantly monochromatic, being black, white, and/or grey.

The order has a few unifying characteristics, starting with their tubular nasal passage which is used for olfaction. Procellariiformes that nest in burrows have a strong sense of smell, being able to detect dimethyl sulfide released from plankton in the ocean. This ability to smell helps to locate patchily distributed prey at sea and may also help locate their nests within nesting colonies. In contrast, surface nesting Procellariiformes have increased vision, having six times better spatial resolution than those that nest in burrows. The structure of the bill, which contains seven to nine distinct horny plates, is another unifying feature, although there are differences within the order. Petrels have a plate called the maxillary unguis that forms a hook on the maxilla. The smaller members of the order have a comb-like mandible, made by the tomial plate, for plankton feeding. Most members of the order are unable to walk well on land, and many species visit their remote breeding islands only at night. The exceptions are the huge albatrosses, several of the gadfly petrels and shearwaters and the fulmars. The latter can disable even large predatory birds with their obnoxious stomach oil, which they can project some distance. This stomach oil, stored in the proventriculus, is a digestive residue created in the foregut of all tubenoses except the diving petrels, and is used mainly for storage of energy-rich food during their long flights. The oil is also fed to their young, as well as being used for defence.

Procellariiforms drink seawater, so they have to excrete excess salt. All birds have an enlarged nasal gland at the base of the bill, above the eyes, and in the Procellariiformes the gland is active. In general terms, the salt gland removes salt from the system and forms a 5 percent saline solution that drips out of the nostrils, or is forcibly ejected in some petrels. The processes behind this involve high levels of sodium ion reabsorption into the blood plasma within the kidneys, and secretion of sodium chloride via the salt glands using less water than was absorbed, which essentially generates salt-free water for other physiological uses. This high efficiency of sodium ion absorption is attributed to mammalian-type nephrons.

== Behaviour and biology ==
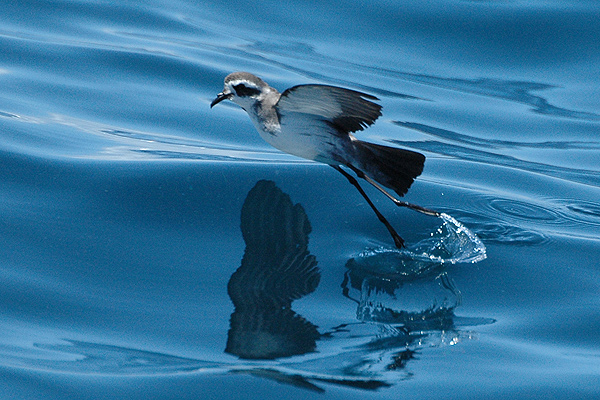
A white-faced storm petrel moves across the water's surface in a series of bounding leaps.

Most albatrosses and procellariids use two techniques to minimise exertion while flying, dynamic soaring, and slope soaring. The albatrosses and giant petrels share a morphological adaptation to aid in flight, a sheet of tendon which locks the wing when fully extended, allowing the wing to be kept up and out without any muscle effort. Amongst the Oceanitidae storm petrels there are two unique flight patterns, one being surface pattering. In this they move across the water surface holding and moving their feet on the water's surface while holding steady above the water, and remaining stationary by hovering with rapid fluttering or by using the wind to anchor themselves in place. A similar flight method is thought to have been used by the extinct petrel family Diomedeoididae. The white-faced storm petrel possesses a unique variation on pattering, holding its wings motionless and at an angle into the wind, it pushes itself off the water's surface in a succession of bounding jumps.

=== Distribution and movements ===
The procellariiforms have a cosmopolitan distribution across the world's oceans and seas, although at the levels of family and genus there are some clear patterns. Antarctic petrels, Thalassoica antarctica, have to fly over 100 mi (160 km) to get to the ocean from their breeding colonies in Antarctica, and northern fulmars breed on the northeastern tip of Greenland, the northernmost piece of land. The most cosmopolitan family is the Procellariidae, which are found in tropical, temperate and polar zones of both the Northern and the Southern Hemispheres, though the majority do not breed in the tropics, and half the species are restricted to southern temperate and polar regions. The gadfly petrels, Pterodroma, have a generally tropical and temperate distribution, whereas the fulmarine petrels are mostly polar with some temperate species. The majority of the fulmarine petrels, along with all of the prions, are confined to the Southern Hemisphere.

The storm petrels are almost as widespread as the procellariids, and fall into two distinct families; the Oceanitidae have a mostly Southern Hemisphere distribution and the Hydrobatidae are found mostly in the Northern Hemisphere. Amongst the albatrosses the majority of the family is restricted to the Southern Hemisphere, feeding and nesting in cool temperate areas, although one genus, Phoebastria, ranges across the north Pacific. The family is absent from the north Atlantic, although fossil records indicate they bred there once. Finally the diving petrels are restricted to the Southern Hemisphere.

==== Migration ====
The various species within the order have a variety of migration strategies. Some species undertake regular trans-equatorial migrations, such as the sooty shearwater which annually migrates from its breeding grounds in New Zealand and Chile to the North Pacific off Japan, Alaska and California, an annual round trip of 64,000 km (40,000 mi), the second longest measured annual migration of any bird. A number of other petrel species undertake trans-equatorial migrations, including Wilson's storm petrel, sooty and Manx shearwaters, and the Providence petrel, but no albatrosses cross the equator, as they rely on wind assisted flight. There are other long-distance migrants within the order; Swinhoe's storm petrels breed in the western Pacific and migrate to the western Indian Ocean, and Bonin petrels nesting in Hawaii migrate to the coast of Japan during the non-breeding season.

==== Navigation ====
Many species in the order travel long distances over open water but return to the same nest site each year, raising the question of how they navigate so accurately. The Welsh naturalist Ronald Lockley carried out early research into animal navigation with the Manx shearwaters that nested on the island of Skokholm. In release experiments, a Manx shearwater flew from Boston to Skokholm, a distance of 3,000 miles (4,800 kilometres) in 12 1/2 days. Lockley showed that when released "under a clear sky" with sun or stars visible, the shearwaters oriented themselves and then "flew off in a direct line for Skokholm", making the journey so rapidly that they must have flown almost in a straight line. But if the sky was overcast at the time of release, the shearwaters flew around in circles "as if lost" and returned slowly or not at all, implying that they navigated using astronomical cues.

Researchers have also begun investigating the role of olfaction in procellariiform navigation. In a study where Cory's shearwaters were rendered anosmic with zinc sulphate, a compound which kills the surface layer of the olfactory epithelium, and released hundreds of kilometers away from their home colony at night, control birds found their way to their home nests before night was over, whereas anosmic birds did not home until the next day. A similar study that released Cory's shearwaters 800 km from their home nests, testing both magnetic and olfactory disturbance effects on navigation, found that anosmic birds took longer to home than magnetically disturbed or control birds.

=== Diet and feeding ===
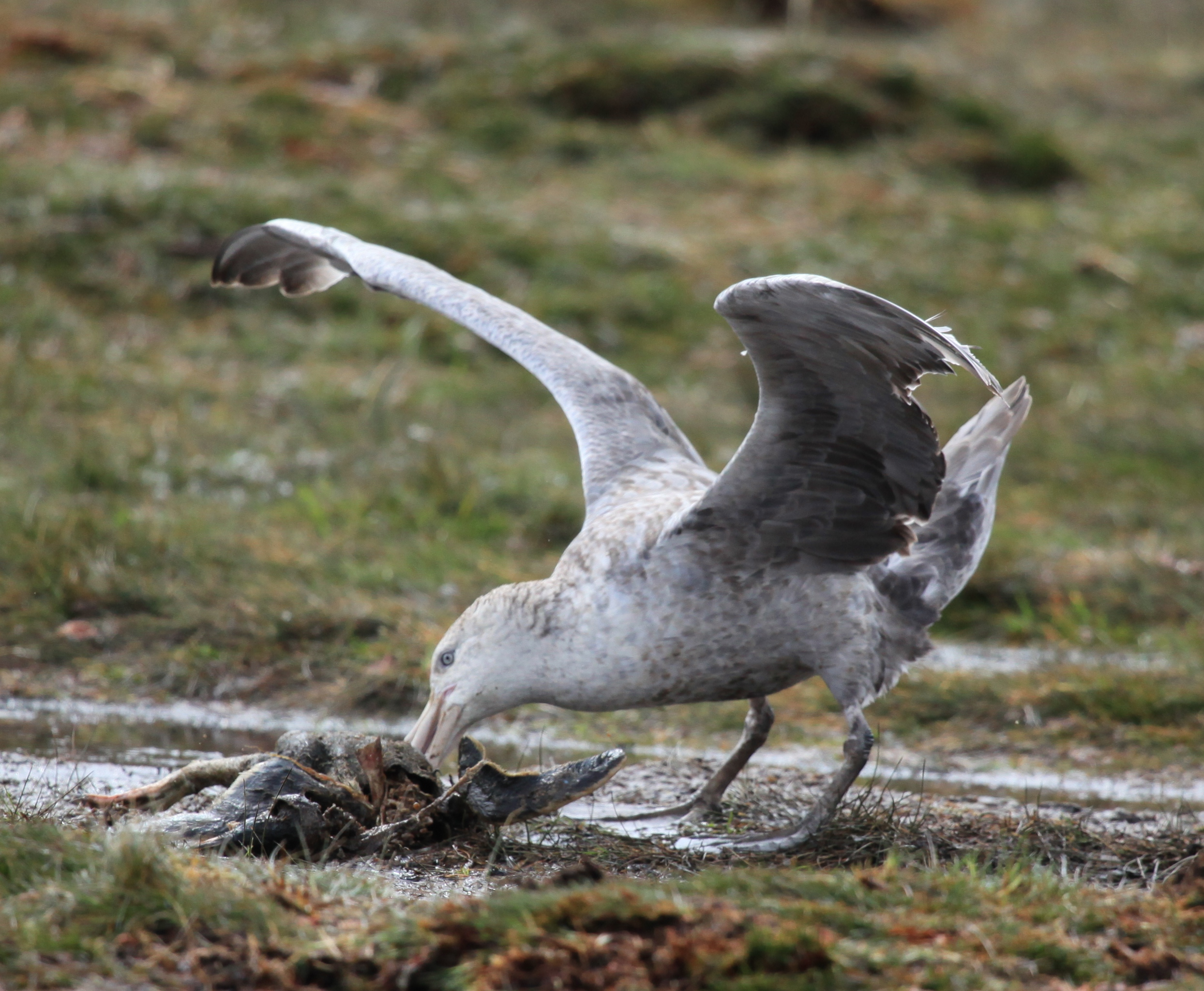
The Northern giant petrel is one of the few petrel species that feeds on land

The procellariiforms are for the most part exclusively marine foragers; the only exception to this rule are the two species of giant petrel, which regularly feed on carrion or other seabirds while on land. While some other species of fulmarine and Procellaria petrels also take carrion, the diet of most species of albatrosses and petrels is dominated by fish, squid, krill and other marine zooplankton. The importance of these food sources varies from species to species and family to family. For example, of the two albatross species found in Hawaii, the black-footed albatross takes mostly fish, while the Laysan albatross feeds mainly on squid. The albatrosses in general feed on fish, squid and krill. Among the procellariids, the prions concentrate on small crustacea, the fulmarine petrels take fish and krill but little squid, while the Procellaria petrels consume mainly squid. The storm petrels take small droplets of oil from the surface of the water, as well as small crustaceans and fish.

Petrels obtain food by snatching prey while swimming on the surface, snatching prey from the wing or diving down under the water to pursue prey. Dipping down from flight is most commonly used by the gadfly petrels and the storm petrels. There have been records of wedge-tailed shearwaters snatching flying fish from the air, but as a rule this technique is rare. Some diving birds may aid diving by beginning with a plunge from the air, but for the most part petrels are active divers and use their wings to move around under the water. The depths achieved by various species were determined in the 1990s and came as a surprise to scientists; short-tailed shearwaters have been recorded diving to 70 m (230 ft), sooty shearwaters to 68 m (223 ft), and the Light-mantled sooty albatross to 12 m (39 ft).

=== Life history ===
==== Breeding colonies ====
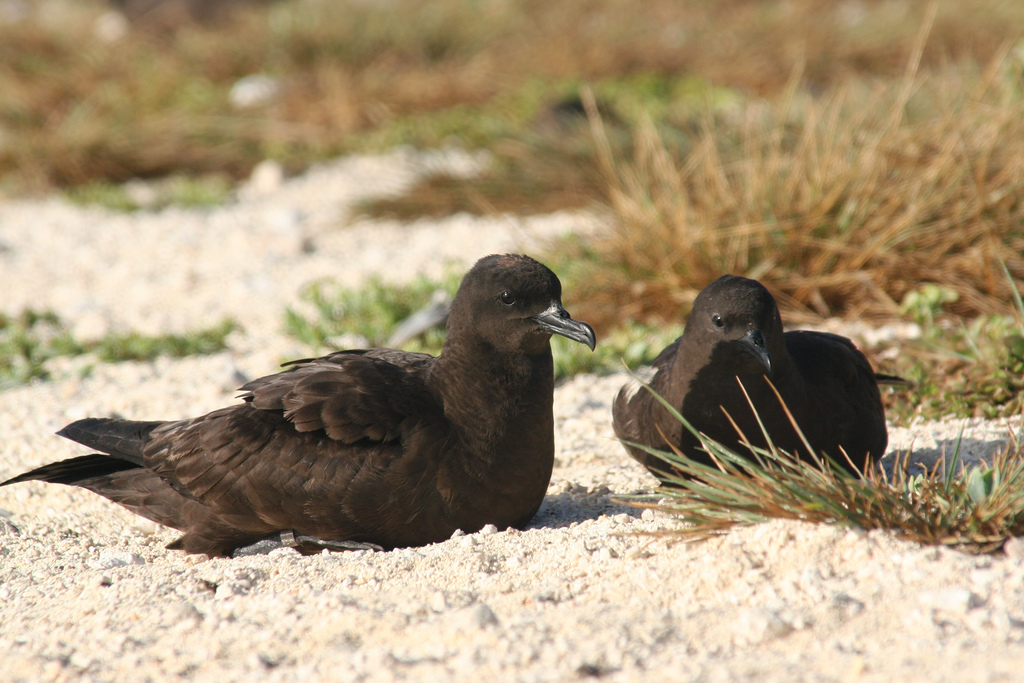
The Christmas shearwater is one of the surface-nesting tropical procellariiforms.

All procellariiforms are colonial, predominantly breeding on offshore or oceanic islands. The few species that nest on continents do so in inhospitable environments such as dry deserts or on Antarctica. These colonies can vary from the widely spaced colonies of the giant petrels to the dense 3.6 million-strong colonies of Leach's storm petrels. For almost all species the need to breed is the only reason that procellariiforms return to land at all. Some of the larger petrels have to nest on windswept locations as they require wind to take off and forage for food. Within the colonies, pairs defend usually small territories (the giant petrels and some albatrosses can have very large territories) which is the small area around either the nest or a burrow. Competition between pairs can be intense, as is competition between species, particularly for burrows. Larger species of petrels will even kill the chicks and even adults of smaller species in disputes over burrows. Burrows and natural crevices are most commonly used by the smaller species; all the storm petrels and diving petrels are cavity nesters, as are many of the procellariids. The fulmarine petrels and some tropical gadfly petrels and shearwaters are surface nesters, as are all the albatrosses.

Procellariiforms show high levels of philopatry, both site fidelity and natal philopatry. Natal philopatry is the tendency of an individual bird to return to its natal colony to breed, often many years after leaving the colony as a chick. This tendency has been shown through ringing studies and mitochondrial DNA studies. Birds ringed as chicks have been recaptured close to their original nests, sometimes extremely close; in the Laysan albatross the average distance between hatching site and the site where a bird established its own territory was 22 m (72 ft), and a study of Cory's shearwaters nesting near Corsica found that nine out of 61 male chicks that returned to breed at their natal colony actually bred in the burrow they were raised in. Mitochondrial DNA provides evidence of restricted gene flow between different colonies, strongly suggesting philopatry.

The other type of philopatry exhibited is site fidelity, where pairs of birds return to the same nesting site for a number of years. Among the most extreme examples known of this tendency was the fidelity of a ringed northern fulmar that returned to the same nest site for 25 years. The average number of birds returning to the same nest sites is high in all species studied, with around 91 percent for Bulwer's petrels, and 85 percent of males and 76 percent of females for Cory's shearwaters (after a successful breeding attempt).

==== Pair bonds ====
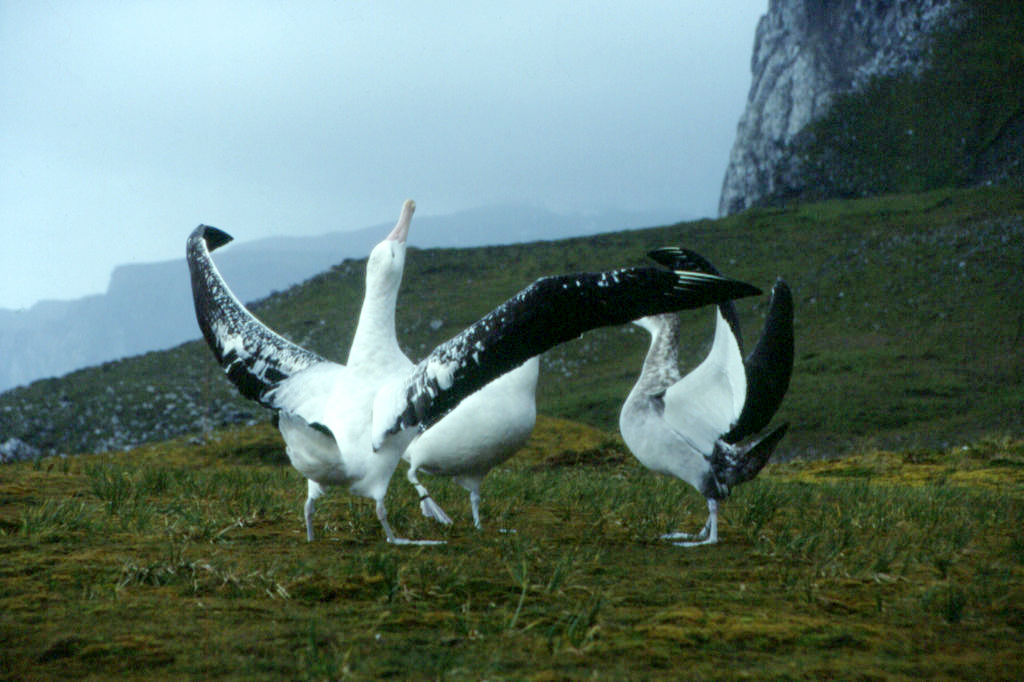
Wandering albatrosses performing their mating dances on the Kerguelen Islands

Procellariiforms are monogamous breeders and form long-term pair bonds. These pair bonds take several years to develop in some species, particularly with the albatrosses. Once formed, they last for many breeding seasons, in some cases for the life of the pair. Petrel courtship can be elaborate. It reaches its extreme with the albatrosses, where pairs spend many years perfecting and elaborating mating dances. These dances are composed of synchronised performances of various actions such as preening, pointing, calling, bill clacking, staring, and combinations of such behaviours (like the sky-call). Each particular pair will develop their own individual version of the dance. The breeding behaviour of other procellariiforms is less elaborate, although similar bonding behaviours are involved, particularly for surface-nesting species. These can involve synchronised flights, mutual preening and calling. Calls are important for helping birds locate potential mates and distinguishing between species, and may also help individuals assess the quality of potential mates. After pairs have been formed, calls serve to help them reunite; the ability of individuals to recognise their own mate has been demonstrated in several species.

==== Nesting and chick rearing ====
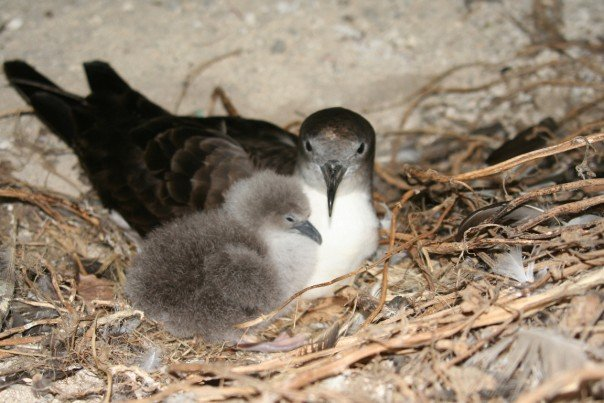
A semi-precocial wedge-tailed shearwater chick with guarding parent

The majority of procellariiforms nest once a year and do so seasonally. Some tropical shearwaters, like the Christmas shearwater, are able to nest on cycles slightly shorter than a year, and the large great albatrosses (genus Diomedea) nest in alternate years (if successful). Most temperate and polar species nest over the spring-summer, although some albatrosses and procellariids nest over the winter. In the tropics, some species can be found breeding throughout the year, but most nest in discreet periods. Procellariiforms return to nesting colonies as much as several months before laying, and attend their nest sites regularly before copulation. Prior to laying, females embark on a lengthy pre-laying exodus to build up energy reserves in order to lay the exceptionally large egg; the female grey-faced petrel may spend as much as 80 days feeding out at sea after courtship before laying the egg. In the European storm petrel, a very small procellariiform, the egg can be 29 percent of the body weight of the female.

When the female returns and lays, incubation is shared between the sexes, with the male taking the first incubation stint and the female returning to sea. The duration of individual stints varies from just a few days to as much as several weeks, during which the incubating bird can lose a considerable amount of weight. The incubation period varies from species to species, around 40 days for the smallest storm petrels but longer for the largest species; for albatrosses it can span 70 to 80 days, which is the longest incubation period of any bird.

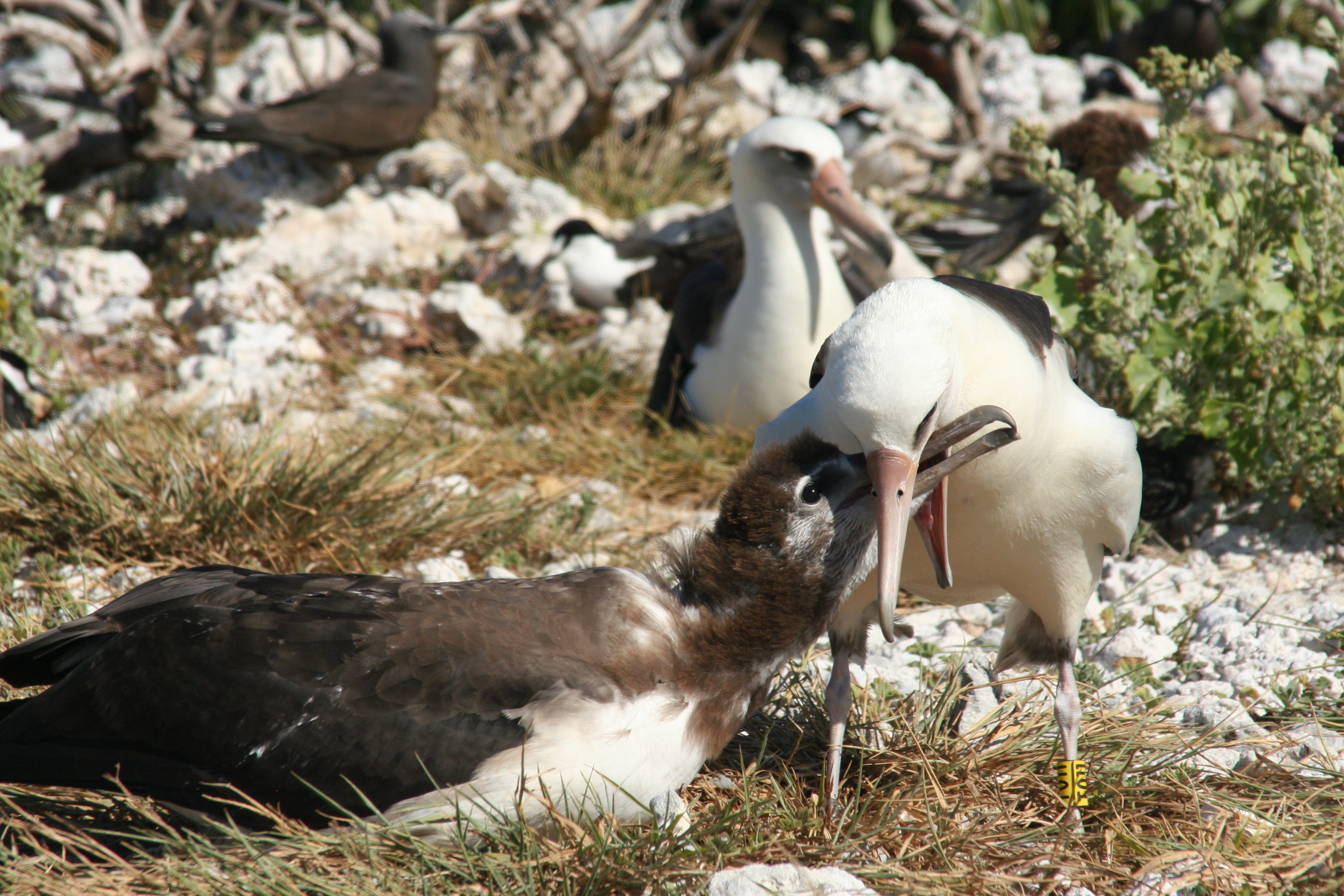
A Laysan albatross feeds its chick. The parent pumps food from a modified foregut, the proventriculus, and the chick catches the meal in its lower mandible.

Upon hatching, the chicks are semi-precocial, having open eyes, a dense covering of white or grey down feathers, and the ability to move around the nesting site. After hatching, the incubating adult remains with the chick for a number of days, a period known as the guard phase. In the case of most burrow-nesting species, this is only until the chick is able to thermoregulate, usually two or three days. Diving petrel chicks take longer to thermoregulate and have a longer guard phase than other burrow nesters. However, surface-nesting species, which have to deal with a greater range of weather and to contend with predators like skuas and frigatebirds, consequently have a longer guard phase (as long as two weeks in procellariids and three weeks in albatrosses).

The chick is fed by both parents. Chicks are fed on fish, squid, krill, and stomach oil. Stomach oil is oil composed of neutral dietary lipids that are the residue created by digestion of the prey items. As an energy source for chicks it has several advantages over undigested prey, its calorific value is around 9.6 kcal per gram, which is only slightly lower than the value for diesel oil. This can be a real advantage for species that range over huge distances to provide food for hungry chicks. The oil is also used in defence. All procellariiforms create stomach oil except the diving petrels.

The chick fledges between two and nine months after hatching, almost twice as long as a gull of the same body mass. The reasons behind the length of time are associated with the distance from the breeding site to food. First, there are few predators at the nesting colonies, therefore there is no pressure to fledge quickly. Second, the time between feedings is long due to the distance from the nest site that adults forage, thus a chick that had a higher growth rate would stand a better chance of starving to death. The duration between feedings vary among species and during the stages of development. Small feeds are frequent during the guard phase, but afterward become less frequent. However, each feed can deliver a large amount of energy; both sooty shearwater and mottled petrel chicks have been recorded to double their weight in a single night, probably when fed by both parents.

==== Longevity ====
Procellariiforms are K-selected, being long-lived and caring extensively for their few offspring. Breeding is delayed for several years after fledging, sometimes for as long as ten years in the largest species. Once they begin breeding, they make only a single breeding attempt per nesting season; even if the egg is lost early in the season, they seldom re-lay. Much effort is placed into laying a single (proportionally) large egg and raising a single chick. Procellariiforms are generally long-lived; even the tiny storm petrels are known to have survived for over 38 years, and Manx shearwaters are known to exceed 50 years. The oldest living bird is Wisdom, a female Laysan albatross currently at least 75 years old.

== Relationship with humans ==
=== Role in culture ===
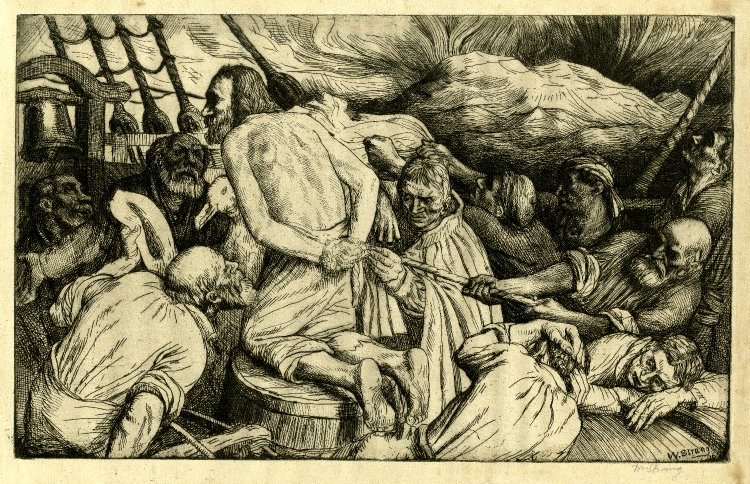
The Albatross about my Neck was Hung: 1896 etching by William Strang illustrating Coleridge's 1798 poem The Rime of the Ancient Mariner

The most important family culturally is the albatrosses, which have been described by one author as "the most legendary of birds". Albatrosses have featured in poetry in the form of Samuel Taylor Coleridge's famous 1798 poem The Rime of the Ancient Mariner, which in turn gave rise to the usage of albatross as metaphor for a burden. More generally, albatrosses were believed to be good omens, and to kill one would bring bad luck. There are few instances of petrels in culture, although there are sailors' legends regarding the storm petrels, which are considered to warn of oncoming storms. In general, petrels were considered to be "soul birds", representing the souls of drowned sailors, and it was considered unlucky to touch them.

In the Russian language, many petrel species from the Hydrobatidae and Procellariidae families of the order Procellariiformes are known as burevestnik, which literally means 'the announcer of the storm'. When in 1901, the Russian writer Maxim Gorky turned to the imagery of subantarctic avifauna to describe Russian society's attitudes to the coming revolution, he used a storm-announcing petrel as the lead character of a poem that soon became popular in the revolutionary circles as "the battle anthem of the revolution". Although the species called "stormy petrel" in English is not one of those to which the burevestnik name is applied in Russian (it, in fact, is known in Russian as an entirely un-romantic kachurka), the English translators uniformly used the "stormy petrel" image in their translations of the poem, usually known in English as The Song of the Stormy Petrel.

Various tubenose birds are relevant to the mythologies and oral traditions of Polynesia. The Māori used the wing bones of the albatross to carve flutes. In Hawaiian mythology, Laysan albatrosses are considered ʻaumakua, being a sacred manifestation of the ancestors, and quite possibly also the sacred bird of Kāne. The storm petrel features prominently in the "Origin of Birds" myth.

=== Exploitation ===
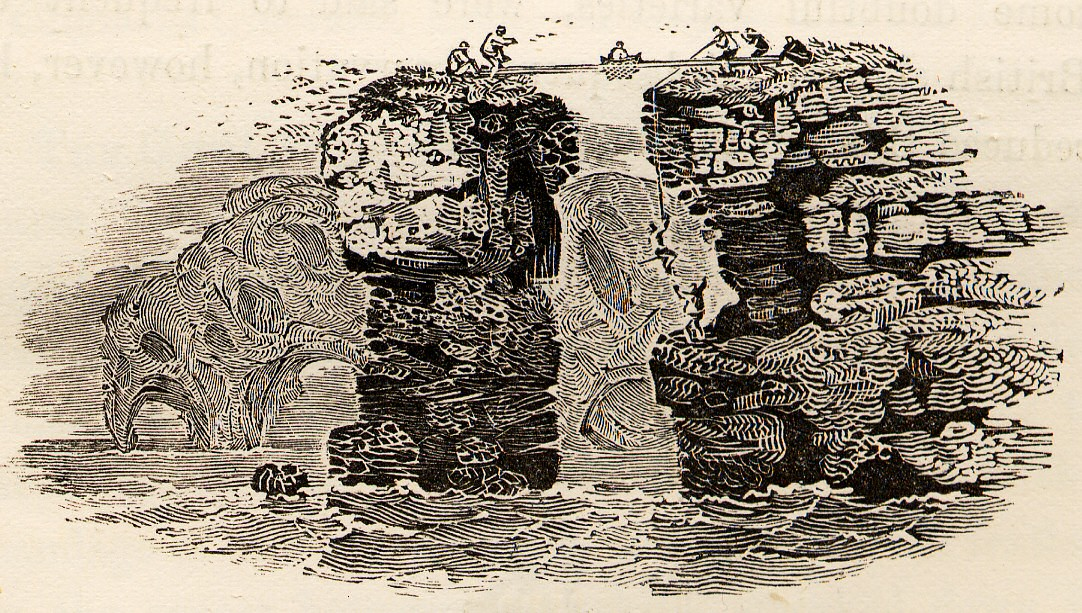
A tail-piece engraving in Bewick's A History of British Birds, showing men exploiting birds nesting on sea cliffs, 1804

Albatrosses and petrels have been important food sources for humans for as long as people have been able to reach their remote breeding colonies. Amongst the earliest-known examples of this is the remains of shearwaters and albatrosses along with those of other seabirds in 5,000-year-old middens in Chile, although it is likely that they were exploited prior to this. Since then, many other marine cultures, both subsistence and industrial, have exploited procellariiforms, in some cases almost to extinction. Some cultures continue to harvest shearwaters (a practice known as muttonbirding); for example, the Māori of New Zealand use a sustainable traditional method known as kaitiakitanga. In Alaska, residents of Kodiak Island harpoon short-tailed albatrosses, Diomedea albatrus, and until the late 1980s residents of Tristan Island in the Indian Ocean harvested the eggs of the Yellow-nosed Mollymawks, Diomedea chlororhynchos, and sooty albatrosses, Phoebetria fusca. Albatrosses and petrels are also now tourist draws in some locations, such as Taiaroa Head. While such exploitation is non-consumptive, it can have deleterious effects that need careful management to protect both the birds and the tourism.

The English naturalist William Yarrell wrote in 1843 that "ten or twelve years ago, Mr. Gould exhibited twenty-four [storm petrels], in a large dish, at one of the evening meetings of the Zoological Society".

The engraver Thomas Bewick wrote in 1804 that "Pennant, speaking of those [birds] which breed on, or inhabit, the Isle of St Kilda, says—'No bird is of so much use to the islanders as this: the Fulmar supplies them with oil for their lamps, down for their beds, a delicacy for their tables, a balm for their wounds, and a medicine for their distempers'". A photograph by George Washington Wilson taken about 1886 shows a "view of the men and women of St Kilda on the beach dividing up the catch of Fulmar". James Fisher, author of The Fulmar (1952) calculated that every person on St Kilda consumed over 100 fulmars each year; the meat was their staple food, and they caught around 12,000 birds annually. However, when the human population left St Kilda in 1930, the population did not suddenly grow.

=== Threats and conservation ===
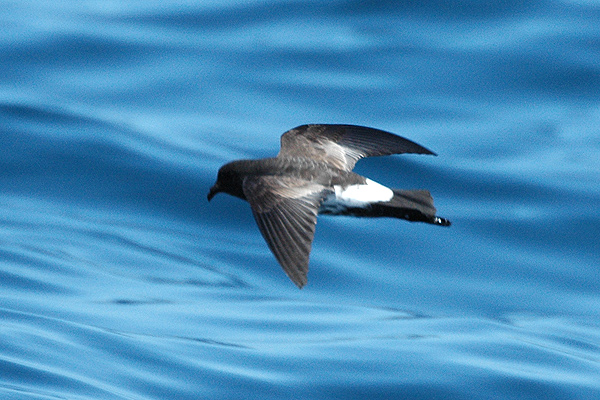
The poorly known New Zealand storm petrel was considered extinct for 150 years before being rediscovered in 2003.

The albatrosses and petrels are "amongst the most severely threatened taxa worldwide". They face a variety of threats, the severity of which varies greatly from species to species. Several species are among the most common of seabirds, including Wilson's storm petrel (an estimated 12 to 30 million individuals) and the short-tailed shearwater (23 million individuals); while the total population of some other species is a few hundred. There are less than 200 Magenta petrels breeding on the Chatham Islands, only 130 to 160 Zino's petrels and only 170 Amsterdam albatrosses. Only one species is thought to have become extinct since 1600, the Guadalupe storm petrel of Mexico, although a number of species had died out before this. Numerous species are very poorly known; for example, the Fiji petrel has rarely been seen since its discovery. The breeding colony of the New Zealand storm petrel was not located until February 2013; it had been thought extinct for 150 years until its rediscovery in 2003, while the Bermuda petrel had been considered extinct for nearly 300 years.

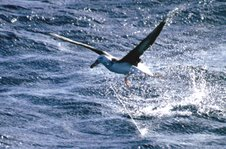
Black-browed albatross hooked on a long-line

The principal threat to the albatrosses and larger species of procellariids is long-line fishing. Bait set on hooks is attractive to foraging birds and many are hooked by the lines as they are set. As many as 100,000 albatrosses are hooked and drown each year on tuna lines set out by long-line fisheries. Before 1991 and the ban on drift-net fisheries, it was estimated that 500,000 seabirds a year died as a result. This has caused steep declines in some species, as procellariiforms are extremely slow breeders and cannot replace their numbers fast enough. Losses of albatrosses and petrels in the Southern Ocean were estimated at between 1 percent and 16 percent per year, which these species cannot sustain for long.

Exotic species introduced to the remote breeding colonies threaten all types of procellariiform. These principally take the form of predators; most albatross and petrel species are clumsy on land and unable to defend themselves from mammals such as rats, feral cats and pigs. This phenomenon, ecological naivete, has resulted in declines in many species and was implicated in the extinction of the Guadalupe storm petrel. Already in 1910 Godman wrote:

Owing to the introduction of the mongoose and other small carnivorous mammals into their breeding haunts, some species, such as Oestrelata jamaicensis and newelli, have already been completely exterminated, and others appear to be in danger of extinction.

— Frederick Du Cane Godman, 1910, vol 1, p. 14.

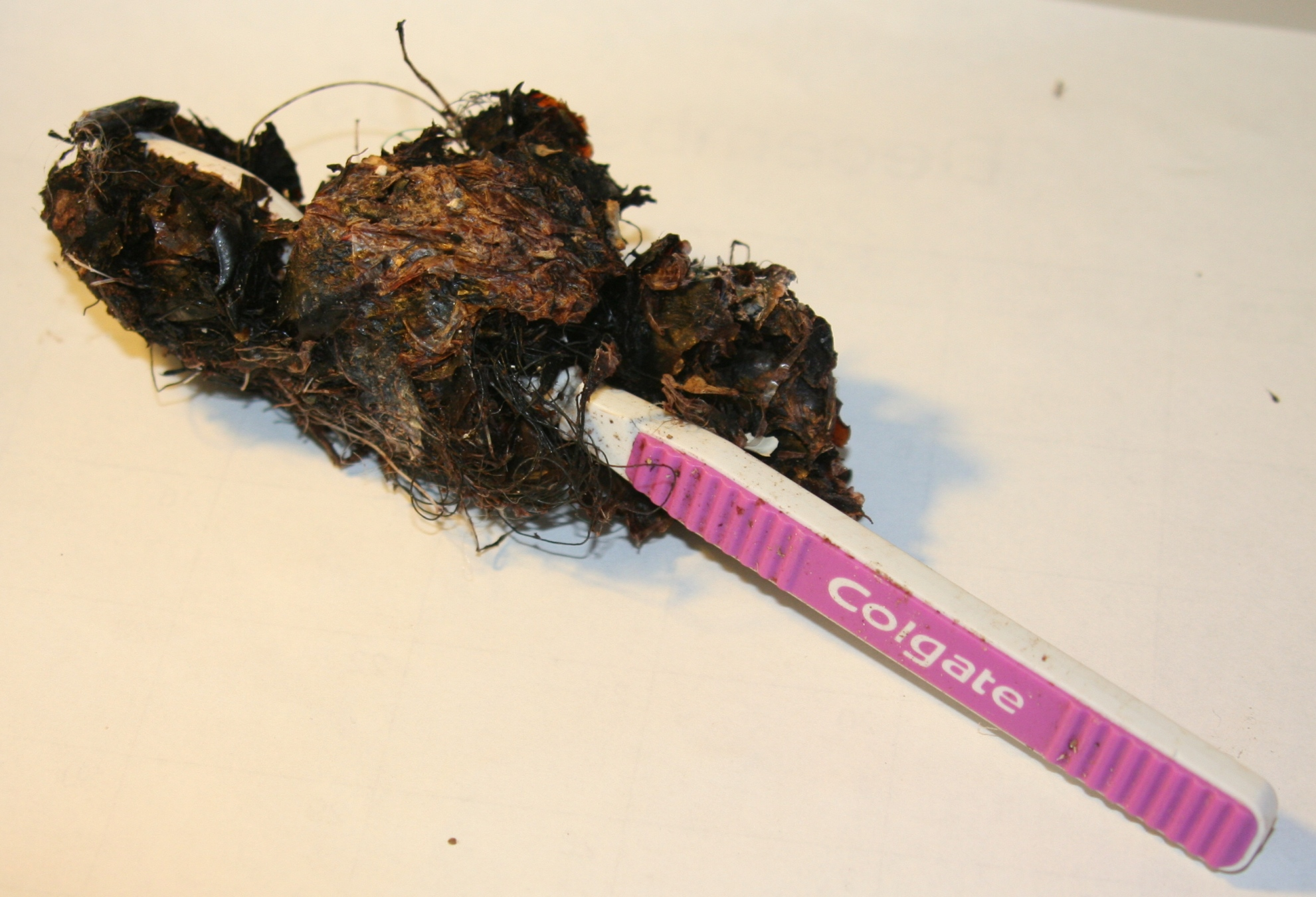
This albatross bolus found in the Hawaiian Islands includes flotsam that was ingested but successfully ejected along with other indigestible matter. If such flotsam cannot be ejected it may cause sickness or death.

Introduced herbivores may unbalance the ecology of islands; introduced rabbits destroyed the forest understory on Cabbage Tree Island off New South Wales, which increased the vulnerability of the Gould's petrels nesting on the island to natural predators, and left them vulnerable to the sticky fruit of the native birdlime tree (Pisonia umbellifera). In the natural state these fruit lodge in the understory of the forest, but with the understory removed the fruit fall to the ground where the petrels move about, sticking to their feathers and making flight impossible.

Exploitation has decreased in importance as a threat. Other threats include the ingestion of plastic flotsam. Once swallowed, plastic can cause a general decline in the fitness of the bird, or in some cases lodge in the gut and cause a blockage, leading to death by starvation. It can also be picked up by foraging adults and fed to chicks, stunting their development and reducing the chances of successfully fledging. Procellariids are also vulnerable to marine pollution, as well as oil spills. Some species, such as Barau's petrel, Newell's shearwater and Cory's shearwater, which nest high up on large developed islands, are victims of light pollution. Fledging chicks are attracted to streetlights and may then be unable to reach the sea. An estimated 20 to 40 percent of fledging Barau's petrels and 45 to 60 percent of fledging Cory's shearwater are attracted to the streetlights on Réunion and Tenerife, respectively.

== Bibliography ==
- Brooke, M. (2004). Albatrosses And Petrels Across The World. Oxford University Press, Oxford, UK. ISBN 0-19-850125-0
- Cocker, M.; Mabey, R. (2005). Birds Britannica. Chatto and Windus. ISBN 978-0-701-16907-7.
- Onley, D.; Scofield P. (2007). Albatrosses, Petrels and Shearwaters of the World. Princeton University Press, Princeton, New Jersey. ISBN 978-0-691-13132-0
