= Burevestnik Cinema =

Coordinates: 47°13′22″N 39°43′09″E

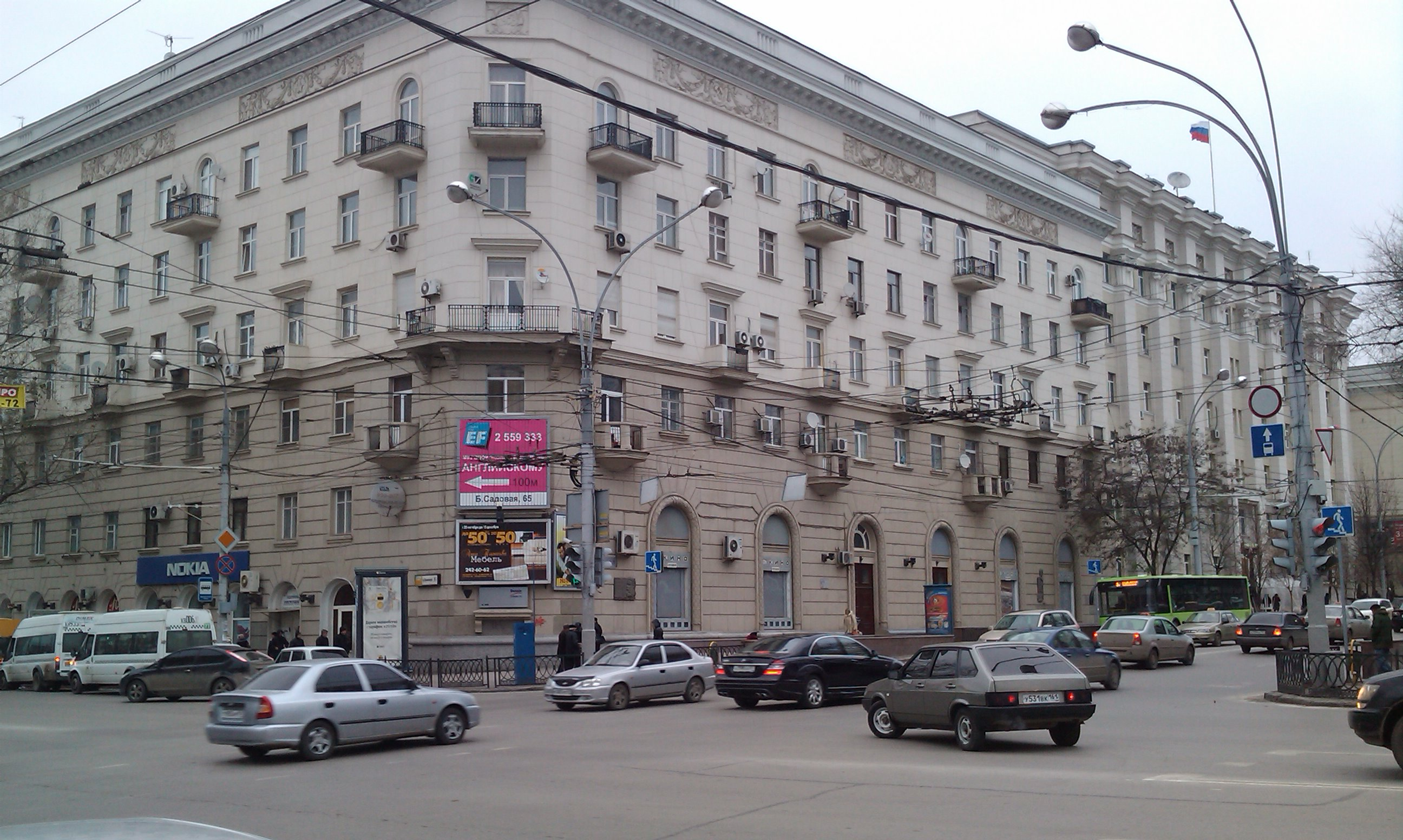
The Burevestnik Cinema in 2009

The Burevestnik Cinema (Russian: Буревестник^{[a]}) was a cinema in Rostov-on-Don, Russia, located at the intersection of Bolshaya Sadovaya Street and Voroshilovsky Prospekt.

== History ==
The site was the location of the Melkonov-Yezekov House. Its first floor was occupied by the cinema Kolizey.^{[b]}

After the October Revolution the cinema was named Sverdlov. On 21 July 1920 Sergei Yesenin performed a poetry reading there, an event marked by a commemorative plaque on the facade facing Bolshaya Sadovaya Street. Anatoly Marienhof also took part in this poetry reading. The building also housed a public club and a library.

The building burned down in the Great Patriotic War, but was reconstructed in 1953. It later housed the Burevestnik cinema. Over its history, numerous actors and cinematographers attended events and screenings, including Rustam Khamdamov, Aleksandr Petrov, Zinaida Kirienko, Anatoly Kuznetsov, Ilya Khrzhanovsky, Alexei Popogrebski, and Aleksandr Rastorguev. Between 2000 and 2008 the cinema held 29 film festivals, 16 sneak previews, and 10 retrospectives.

On 28 September 2008 the municipal administration decided, despite public opposition, to close the cinema and assign the building to the Southern Federal University. The last film to be shown here was Andrei Tarkovsky's Mirror.

The rector of Southern Federal University, Vladislav Zakharevich, claimed that the deed of the cinema was handed over to him only in the summer 2009. But by then half of the premises had already been assigned as a reception office of the President of the Russian Federation.

In February 2010 the sign of the Russian President's plenipotentiary to the Southern Federal District was placed on the façade of the building. The premises of the former cinema were divided into two parts with a wall. The Southern Federal University expressed an intention to revive the tradition of film screenings, but this has yet to be implemented.

== Notes ==
a. "Burevestnik" in Russian means "the announcer of a storm", and is the name of a number of seabird species known in English as petrels.

b. English: Coliseum.
