= Yseult =

Yseult may refer to:

== Places ==
- Yseult Island, a small rocky Antarctic island east of Tristan Island and north of the east point on Cape Jules

== Persons ==
- Yseult (singer) (born 1994), French singer
- Yseult Gervy (born 1979), Belgian swimmer
- Sean Yseult (born 1966), American rock musician

== See also ==
- Iseult, alternatively Yseult amongst others, name of several characters in the Arthurian story of Tristan and Iseult
