= The Stormy Petrel =

Studio album by Leatherface
- Released: 2010
- Genre: Punk rock
- Length: 40:23
- Label: Big Ugly Fish Records

Leatherface chronology
Dog Disco (2004)	The Stormy Petrel (2010)

Professional ratings
Review scores
Source	Rating
Blabbermouth.net	8/10
Punknews.org	4.5/5 stars

The Stormy Petrel is an album by the British punk rock band Leatherface. It was released in the UK in February 2010, their first album to be released on their own label, Big Ugly Fish Records. It was released in North America by No Idea Records.

The album takes its title from the nickname of Joseph Ray “Stormy Petrel” Hodgson who was hailed as a hero after risking his life to save others from the stormy seas that battered 19th-century Sunderland.

== Track listing ==
1. "God is Dead"
2. "My World's End"
3. "Never Say Goodbye"
4. "Nutcase"
5. "Broken"
6. "Another Dance"
7. "Diego Garcia"
8. "Monkfish"
9. "Disgrace"
10. "Belly Dancing Stoat"
11. "Isn't Life Just Sweet?"
12. "Hope"
