= Yseult Island =

Island in Adélie Land, Antarctica

- Location within Antarctica

Geography
- Location: Antarctica
- Coordinates: 66°44′S 140°56′E

Administration
- Administered under the Antarctic Treaty System

Demographics
- Population: Uninhabited

Yseult Island is a small rocky island 1.3 km (0.7 nmi) east of Tristan Island and 0.7 km (0.4 nmi) north of the east point on Cape Jules. Photographed from the air by U.S. Navy Operation Highjump, 1946–47. Charted by the French Antarctic Expedition under Barre, 1951–52, and so named because of its twin relationship with Tristan Island. Yseult is the French spelling of Isolde, legendary heroine incorporated into Arthurian legend and later popularized by Richard Wagner's opera Tristan und Isolde.

== See also ==
- List of Antarctic and sub-Antarctic islands
