= Vidzy =

Vidzy Відзы (Belarusian)
- Urban-type settlement
- Catholic church of the Holy Trinity in Vidzy

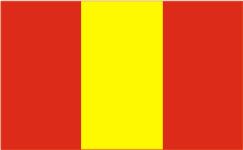
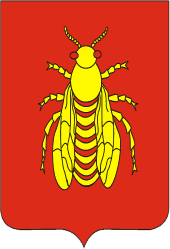
- Flag Coat of arms

- Location in Belarus
- Coordinates: 55°24′N 26°38′E
- Country: Belarus
- Region: Vitebsk Region
- District: Braslaw District

Population (2025)
  - Total: 1,546
- Time zone: UTC+3 (MSK)

Vidzy (Note: Belarusian: Відзы; Russian: Видзы; Lithuanian: Vidžiai; Polish: Widze; Yiddish: ווידזש, romanized: Vidzh.) is an urban-type settlement in Braslaw District, Vitebsk Region, in northern Belarus. As of 2025, it has a population of 1,546.

== History ==
The name Vidzy is of Finno-Ugric origin and is associated with the word vidze, which refers to a "meadow, hayfield". The Finno-Ugric peoples named their settlements after the landscape or after vegetation, animals or fish if it was predominant in that location.

Vidzy is known in historical records since the 15th century, when Grand Duke Sigismund Kęstutaitis transferred the estates of Vidzy to three families at once. Part of Vidzy was also in the permanent possession of the bishops.

In the early 16th century, the prince Albertas Goštautas, owner of the Hieraniony Castle, ruled in Vidzy after the estate was sold to him and his wife in 1524. The estate then passed to the Pac family, and in 1685, Michał Kazimierz Pac transferred the estate to the Canons regular. Stanisław Naruszewicz, procurator of Vilnius, maintained a Calvinist prayer house in Vidzy. The Wawrzecki family in the 18th-century became owners of much of the land around Vidzy.

During the late-18th-century Partitions of Poland, the town was annexed by Russia. During the French invasion of Russia, a skirmish took place in the center of Vidzy on 28 November 1812 between the retreating French and the Cossacks, leading to 116 houses to be destroyed by fire.

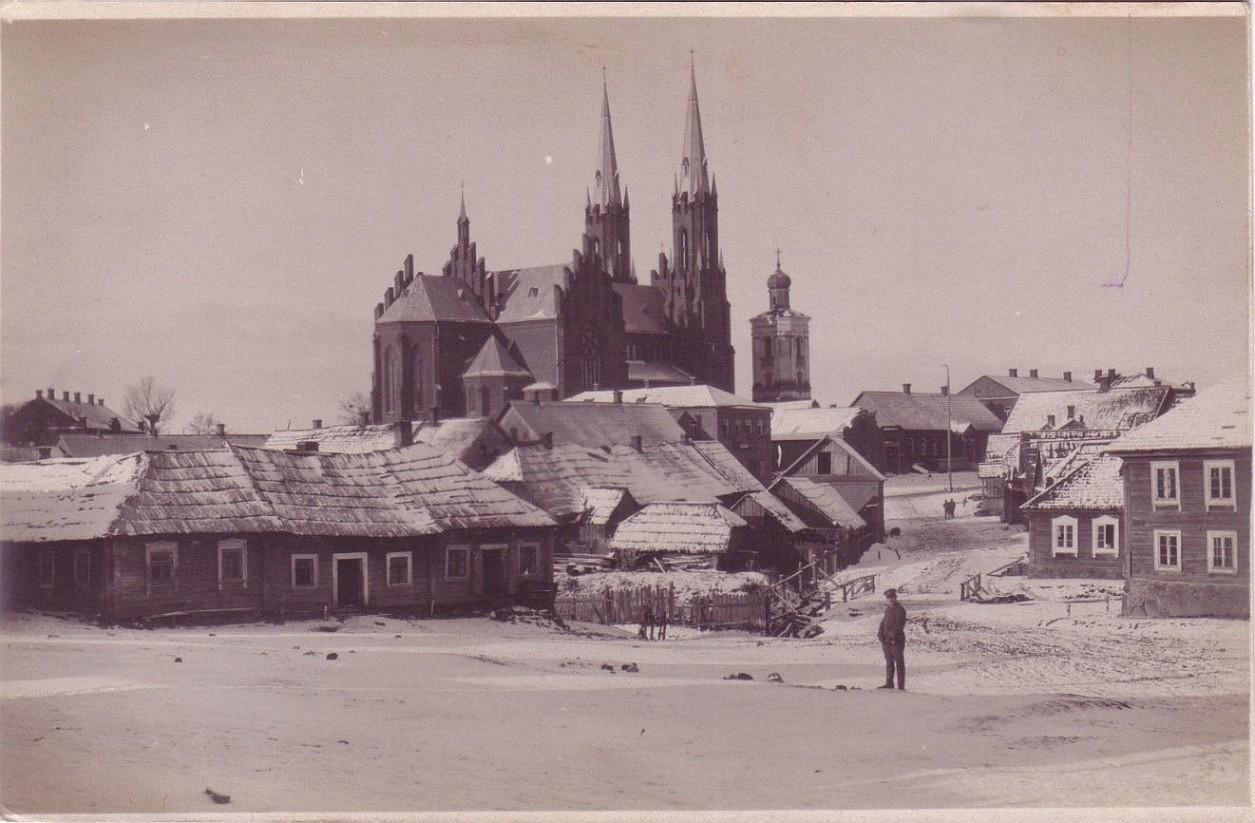
Widze in 1915

In 1875, The Jewish World reported that the city was badly burned in a fire: many buildings were destroyed, and up to 3,000 people were made homeless.

In the interbellum, Widze, as it was known in Polish, was the seat of a gmina within the Brasław County, initially part of the Nowogródek Voivodeship, and from 1926 part of the Wilno Voivodeship. According to the 1921 Polish census, the population of the town was 71.6% Polish and 21.3% Jewish.

During World War II, Widze was occupied by the Soviet Union, and then by Nazi Germany from 27 June 1941 until 8 July 1944, and administered as part of Generalbezirk Litauen of Reichskommissariat Ostland. A ghetto was established in early 1942 and by the summer, most Jews were transferred to the Swieciany ghetto, while others were able to form or join partisan units.

== Demographics ==
In 2024, it had a population of 1,563.

Distribution of the population by ethnicity according to the 2009 census:

	percent
Belarusians	40.78%
Poles	30.63%
Russians	21.72%
Romani	3.52%
Tatars	1.25%
Ukrainians	0.74%
Lithuanians	0.62%

== Notable people ==
- Iosif Bleikhman (1868–1921), revolutionary
- Cecilia Berdichevsky (1925–2010), computer scientist

== Bibliography ==
- Megargee, Geoffrey P.; Dean, Martin (4 May 2012). The United States Holocaust Memorial Museum Encyclopedia of Camps and Ghettos, 1933 –1945: Volume II: Ghettos in German-Occupied Eastern Europe. Indiana University Press. pp. 1146–1148. ISBN 978-0-253-00202-0.
- Tatarinov, Yury (2006). Города Беларуси в некоторых интересных исторических сведениях. Витебщина (in Russian). Minsk: Энциклопедикс. ISBN 9856742366.
