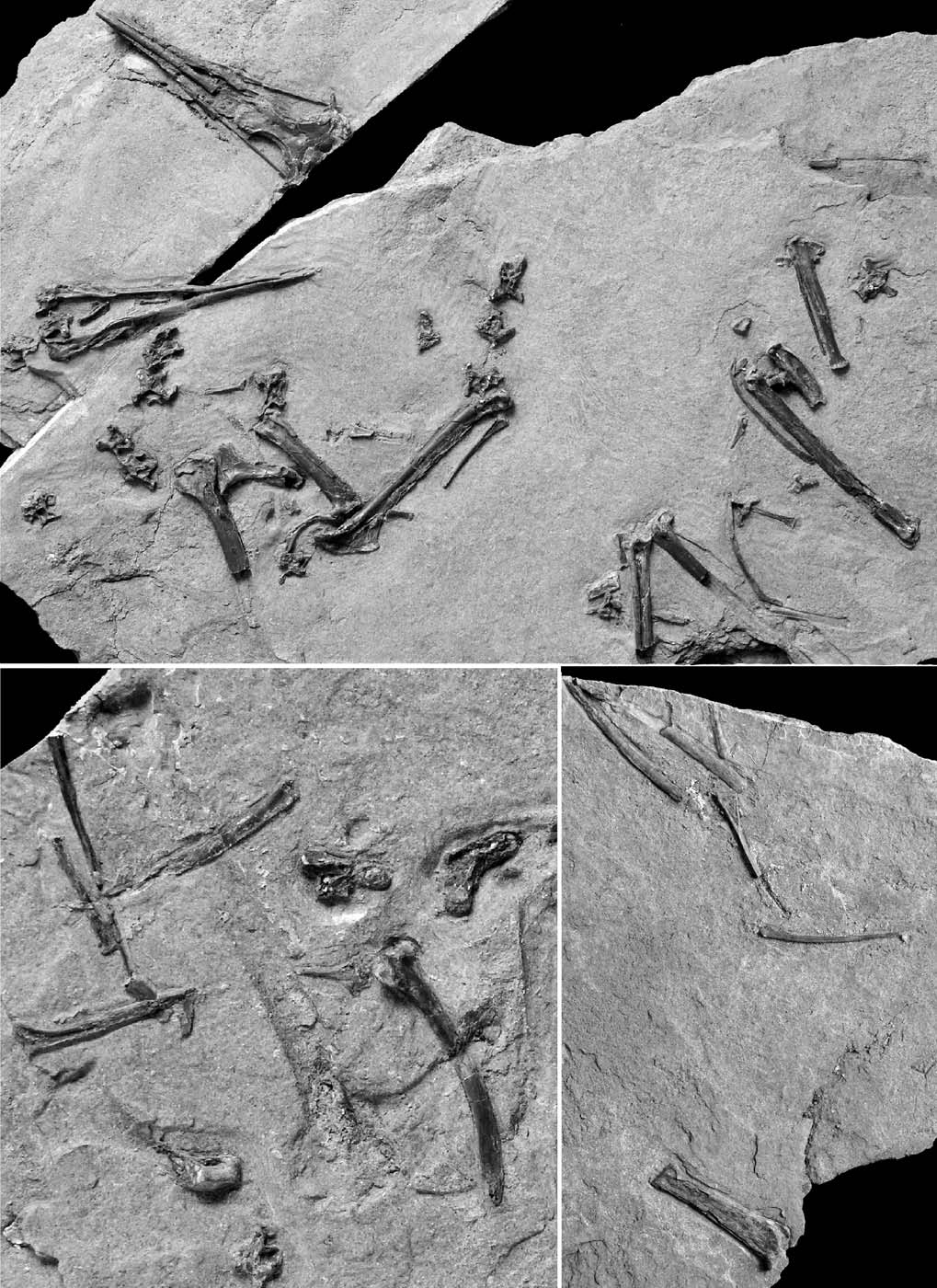
- D. brodkorbi fossil

Scientific classification
- Kingdom: Animalia
- Phylum: Chordata
- Class: Aves
- Order: Procellariiformes
- Family: †Diomedeoididae; Fischer, 1985
- Genus: †Diomedeoides; Fischer, 1985

Type species
- †Diomedeoides minimus Fischer, 1985 (subjective synonym of D. lipsiensis)

Other species
- †Diomedeoides babaheydariensis (Peters and Hamedani, 2000); †Diomedeoides brodkorbi (Cheneval, 1995); †Diomedeoides lipsiensis (Fischer, 1983)

= Diomedeoides =

Diomedeoides Temporal range: Early Oligocene-Early Miocene (Rupelian-Aquitanian)

Extinct genus of birds

Diomedeoides is a prehistoric genus of seabirds. The family was in the order Procellariiformes which today is composed of the albatrosses and petrels. At present it is the only genus in the family Diomedeoididae. There are three described species. The taxonomy of the family and genus is still in need of revision, and it is likely that the genus name Diomedeoides is actually a junior synonym of Rupelornis (van Beneden, 1871).

Fossils of this genus have been found in the Oligocene and Miocene rocks in Europe and Iran. Two species, D. brodkorbi and D. lipsiensis, are known from Central Europe, and a third species, D. babaheydariensis, is known only from Iran.
