= Tristan Island (Antarctica) =

Antarctic island

Tristan Island (66°44′S 140°54′E) is a small rocky island 1.1 km (0.7 mi) west of Yseult Island and 0.3 km (0.2 mi) north of the west point on Cape Jules. Photographed from the air by U.S. Navy Operation Highjump, 1946–47. Charted by the French Antarctic Expedition under Barre, 1951–52, and so named because of its twin relationship with Yseult Island. Tristan is the popular spelling of Tristram, legendary hero incorporated into Arthurian legend and later popularized by Richard Wagner's opera Tristan und Isolde.

== See also ==
- List of Antarctic and sub-Antarctic islands
