= Iosif Bleikhman =

Russian anarcho-communist (1868–1921)

- Іосіф Блейхман
- Born: 1868; Vidzy, Kovno, Russian Empire
- Died: 1921 (aged 52–53); Moscow, Russian Soviet Republic
- Known for: Leadership in the July Days
- Movement: Anarchist communism

Iosif Solomonovich Bleikhman (Note: Belarusian: Іосіф Саламонавіч Блейхман, romanized: Iosif Salamonavich Blyeykhman) (1868 – 1921) was a Belarusian Jewish anarchist communist revolutionary. He was the leader of the Petrograd Federation of Anarchist-Communists at the time of the Russian Revolution in 1917, organising a series of demonstrations against the Russian Provisional Government that culminated in the July Days. Following the October Revolution, he also began to agitate against the new Bolshevik government, which resulted in him being arrested and sentenced to periods of penal labor a number of times. During one of these periods, he contracted tuberculosis, which he succumbed to shortly before the Kronstadt rebellion of 1921.

== Biography ==
In 1868, Bleikhman was born into a petty bourgeois family in the city of Vidzy, in the Kovno Governorate of the Russian Empire (now Belarus). Bleikhman began work as a tin-smith, then as a shoemaker.

=== Revolutionary activism ===
By the turn of the 20th century, he had joined the revolutionary movement and moved to the United States, where he became an anarchist communist. During the Russian Revolution of 1905, he moved to the Latvian city of Daugavpils, where he was active in the local revolutionary movement. In September 1913, he moved to Saint Petersburg, where he joined the local anarchist communist group and agitated within various trade unions. In July 1914, he was arrested during a strike action and sent to Siberia, but he managed to escape and lived clandestinely for a period.

Following the February Revolution, Bleikhman was released from his sentence and moved to Petrograd, where he quickly became leader of the local Anarchist-Communist Federation and edited its newspaper Burevestnik. In the pages of Burevestnik, Bleikhman called for the broad-based expropriation of private property, whether houses or factories, specifically calling on unhoused people to squat privately owned residential buildings. He also agitated among factory workers, who elected him to the Petrograd Soviet. Another member of the Soviet, the Georgian Menshevik Irakli Tsereteli, described him as a "comical figure" with an unarticulated understanding of anarchism.

During the April Crisis, Bleikhman organised mass demonstrations in which workers and soldiers called for the Russian Provisional Government to be overthrown and Russian participation in World War I brought to an end. The following month, he published a series of articles in which he called for an alliance of far-left groups with the goal of establishing anarchist communism, through the socialisation of industry, expropriation of private land and the establishment of communes. In early June, he was delegated to a conference of Petrograd's factory committees, following which he led anarchists in seizing the offices and printing press of the Russkaya Volya newspaper and organised a mass demonstration that secured the release of anarchist and Bolshevik political prisoners from Kresty Prison. He later moved to the island of Kronstadt, where he became secretary of the local inkeepers' union, was elected to the Kronstadt Soviet and joined the Central Bureau of Trade Unions of Kronstadt.

=== July Days ===
By July 1917, the workers, soldiers and sailors of Kronstadt were already beginning to move against the provisional government, in order to bring an end to Russian participation in World War I. In what was to become the July Days, leading anarchists of the Kronstadt Soviet gave speeches in Anchor Square, encouraging the island's garrison to rise up against the provisional government. Bleikhman himself exhorted Kronstadt's 1st machine gun regiment to revolt against the Russian Provisional Government, which he denounced for carrying out political repression against Russian anarchists. While downplaying their lack of support from any political parties or the Petrograd Soviet, he also called on workers to seize control over their workplaces, finally dissolve the state and abolish the capitalist system. Bleikhman was subsequently elected as chairman of the Provisional Revolutionary Committee, which brought together delegates from Petrograd's factory and military committees.

Bleikhman then led the 1st machine gun regiment to Petrograd, where they held armed demonstrations calling for the soviets to seize power from the provisional government. But the Petrograd Soviet would ultimately refuse to endorse the uprising, which it considered premature. The insurrection was quickly repressed by the government, which arrested leading anarchists and Bolsheviks. The Petrograd Federation would later claim the July Days as an anarchist uprising. Bleikhman himself became a fugitive, as he was wanted for arrest by the provisional government.

=== Anti-Bolshevik agitation ===
Following the October Revolution, Bleikhman was elected to the Petrograd Military Revolutionary Committee and became secretary of the Petrograd Federation of Anarchist Groups, once again taking up editing Burevestnik. The newspaper began to call for the overthrow of the newly established Council of People's Commissars and its replacement with a libertarian commune, along the lines of the Paris Commune of 1871.

Bleikhman was soon delegated to the 5th and 6th conferences of Petrograd's factory committees, at which he criticised the Supreme Soviet of the National Economy, calling instead for all management of industry to be transferred to the factory committees. On 15 March 1918, he represented the Skorokhod factory committee at an extraordinary meeting of Petrograd factory commissars, where he criticised the Mensheviks and once again called for the establishment of a workers' commune and the socialisation of industry. As he vocally opposed cooperation with representatives of the bourgeoisie and the intelligentsia, when the assembly decided to meet with the new authorities, he resigned from the organisation. On 30 March, he won over representatives to the Petrograd conference of the Red Army and was delegated by them to the 3rd Congress of the Baltic Fleet.

Following the anarchist campaign against the Treaty of Brest-Litovsk, with the Black Guards continuing to carry out underground militant activities, the Bolshevik government initiated a wave of political repression against the anarchist movement. When a series of raids were carried out against the Moscow Federation of Anarchist Groups, Burevestnik compared the Cheka to generals of the Black Hundreds and denounced the as counter-revolutionary. The Cheka responded by raiding the Petrograd Federation, arresting Bleikhman, despite his membership in the Petrograd Soviet, and shutting down Burevestnik. In November 1918, the Cheka sentenced Bleikhman to penal labor in Vologda.

In early 1919, he moved to Moscow, where he spoke at a series of non-party conferences in Zamoskvorechye, where he criticised the rule of the Russian Communist Party. Bleikhman, along with German Askarov and Vladimir Barmash, formed a delegation of anarchist communists that attempted to form a united front with the anarcho-syndicalists. But little came of this venture aside from the brief publication of Trud i Volia, which made appeals for direct action against the Bolshevik government before being shut down by the authorities.

=== Death and legacy ===
In 1920, Bleikhman joined the Moscow trade union council and attempted to establish a commune with a group of anarchists, but was unsuccessful. In October 1920, he was arrested on charges of collaboration with the Makhnovshchina and once again sent to Vologda to work in logging, but he contracted tuberculosis and was granted compassionate release.

In early 1921, Bleikhman died in Moscow, having finally succombed to his respiratory disease. Irakli Tsereteli would later assert in his memoirs that Bleikhman was shot by the Cheka, although this was denied by historian Paul Avrich.

By March 1921, the Kronstadt rebellion had broken out against the Bolshevik government, with revolutionaries once again holding meetings in Anchor Square, where Bleikhman had first roused them to revolt four years before.

== Bibliography ==
- Avrich, Paul (1971) [1967]. The Russian Anarchists. Princeton: Princeton University Press. ISBN 0-691-00766-7. OCLC 1154930946.
- Krivensky, V.V. (20 January 2000). Rumyantsev, Vyacheslav (ed.). "Блейхман Иосиф Соломонович (Солнцев)". Hrono.ru (in Russian).
- Rublev, Dmitry Ivanovich (5 July 2023). "Блейхман Иосиф Соломонович". Great Russian Encyclopedia (in Russian).
