= Chernov House =

Building in Rostov-on-Don, Russia

Coordinates: 47°13′21.6″N 39°43′05.5″E

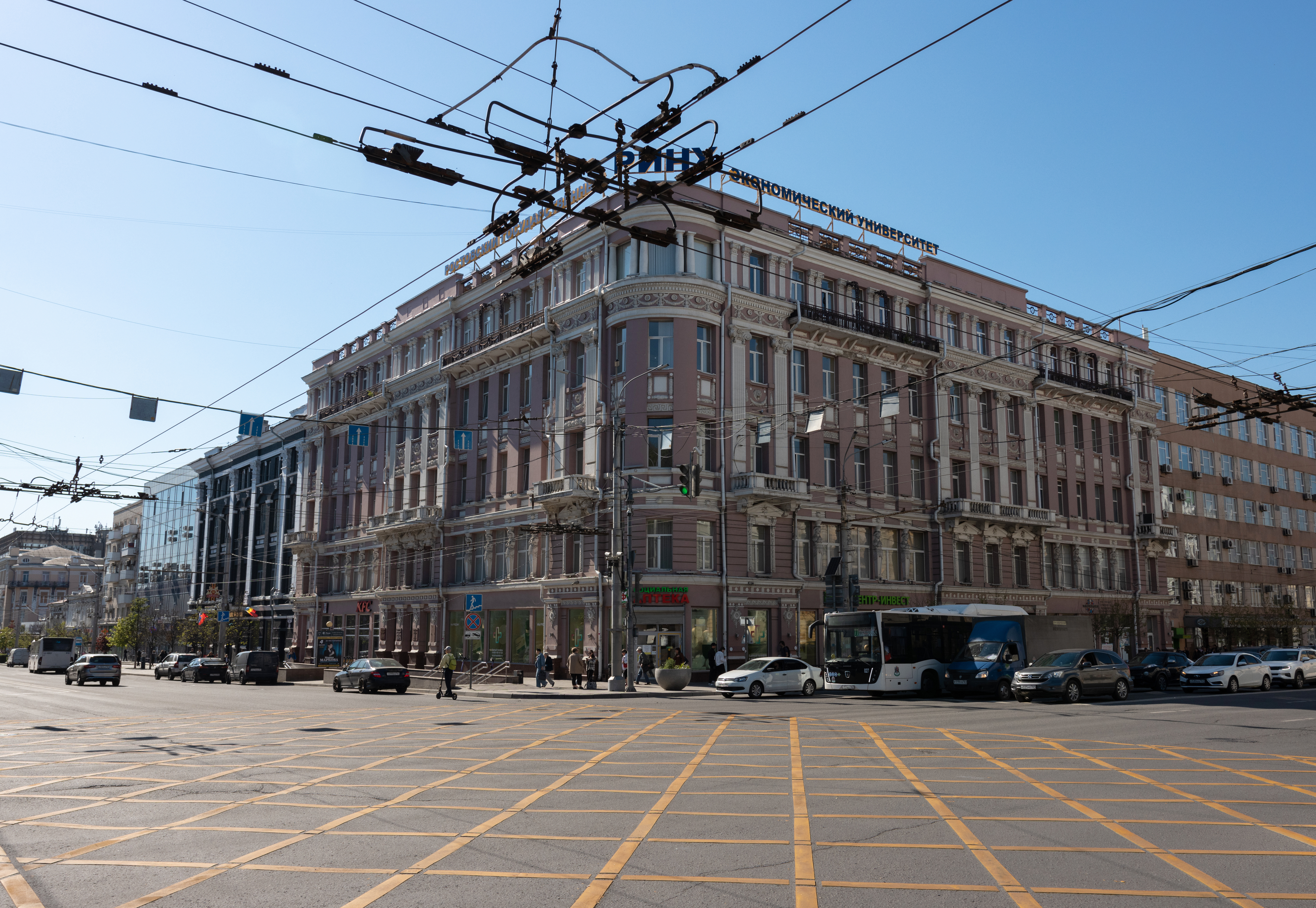
Chernov House

The Chernov House (Russian: Дом Чернова, romanized: Dom Chernova) is a building in the Kirovsky City District of Rostov-on-Don, Russia. The house is located at 69 Bolshaya Sadovaya Street (Russian: Большая Садовая, 69) at the intersection of Voroshilovsky Prospekt and Bolshaya Sadovaya Street. It was a revenue house. The building has the status of an object of cultural heritage of Russia of regional significance.

== History ==
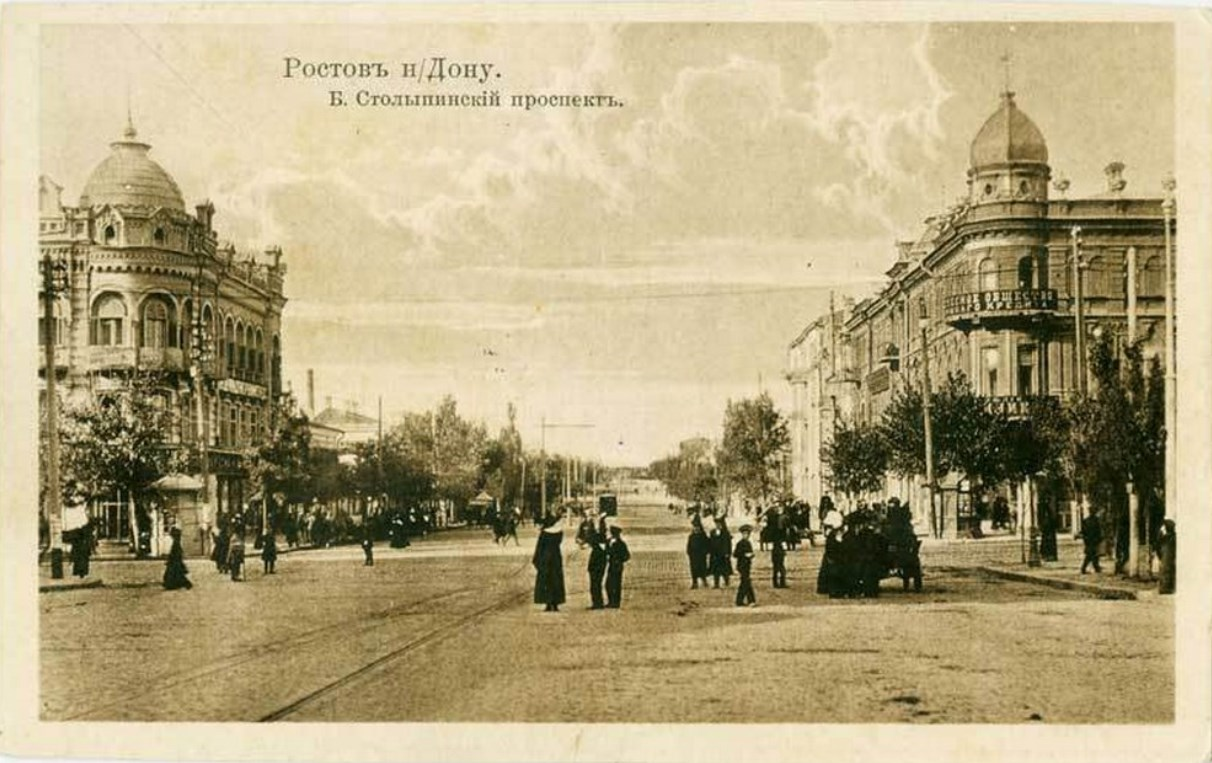
Chernov House (on the left), Melkonov-Yezekov House (on the right)

The Chernov House was built in the 1890s by order of Rostov merchant Karapet Chernov. Originally the building had only three storeys but, due to the housing boom in Rostov-on-Don, the number of storeys was increased to five floors to a design by Rostov-on-Don architect F. S. Yasinsky and engineer G. G. Chorchopyan. An urban legend relates to the construction of the building. Two merchants allegedly made a bet about which one of them was richest. They decided to each build a revenue house, making them as luxurious as possible, on opposite sides of Bolshaya Sadovaya Street. Both houses were built with five storeys, but the rival Melkonov-Yezekov House as completed was taller than the Chernov House, by having a taller dome on the roof.

Before the revolution of 1917, Saint Petersburg International Commercial Bank, the Merchant Society of Mutual Credit, Agricultural Bank, and the dentist M. M. Sabsovich occupied premises on the ground floor. The building was nationalized after the establishment of Soviet rule in 1920. The upper floors were turned over to Dinamo sports club, Palace of Labour and other organizations. In 1931, the Chernov House was turned over to Institute of Economics and Finance. The building was badly damaged during the Second World War. It was restored to the design of architects M. N. Inushnin and G. A. Petrov, resulting in the partial loss of the building's original appearance. The roof balustrade has been removed.

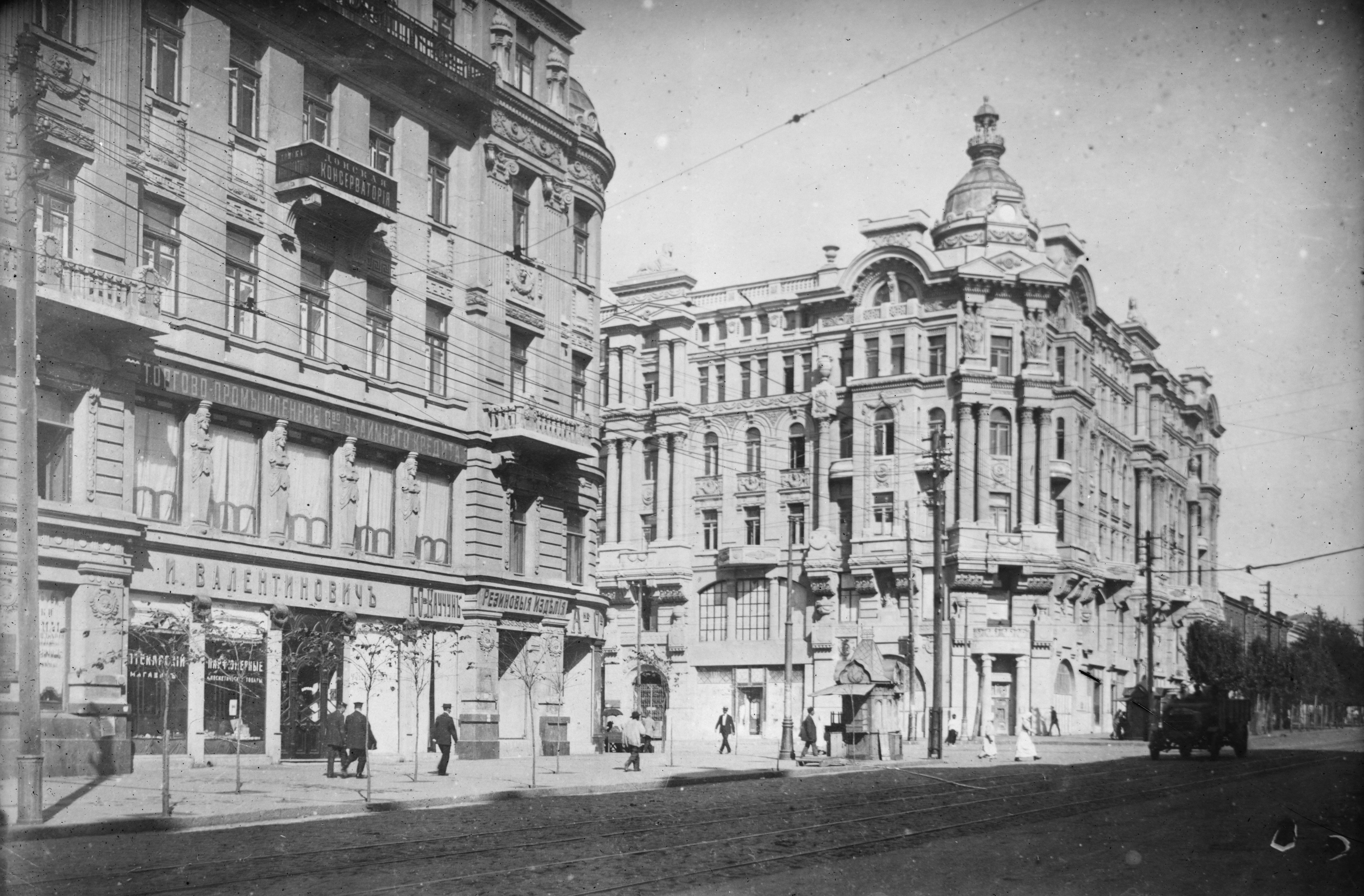
Chernov House (on the left), Melkonov-Yezekov House (on the right) in 1919

In 1964 the Institute of Economics and Finance was renamed the Institute of National Economy. It is now the Rostov State University of Economics, and continues to occupy the Chernov House.

== Description ==
The five-storey building was designed in the Art Nouveau style in the end of the 19th century. The facade is decorated with Corinthian and Ionic twin pilasters, wreaths, escutcheons, casings, garlands, lion masks, attic, and floral ornament. The first and second floors are decorated with banded rustications. The fifth floor has small balconies with delicate iron-cast railing.
