= Burevestnik (Petrograd, 1917) =

- Type: Daily
- Founded: November 1917
- Ceased publication: May 1918
- Political alignment: Anarchist
- Language: Russian
- Headquarters: Petrograd
- Circulation: ~25,000

Burevestnik (Russian: Буревестник, 'Petrel') was a newspaper published daily from Petrograd, Russia. Burevestnik was the organ of the Petrograd Federation of Anarchist Groups. The newspaper was founded in November 1917 (seven months after the founding of the Petrograd Federation). Burevestnik was primarily distributed in Vyborg district, Kronstadt, Kolpino and Obukhovo. It had a readership of around 25,000. This newspaper was one of several publications with the name Burevestnik, a name originating in Maxim Gorky's poem Song of the Stormy Petrel.

Burevestnik was edited by Apollon Karelin, Iosif Bleikhman, Abba Gordin and V. L. Gordin. Amongst the writers of Burevestnik there were two distinct tendencies; the moderate tendency of Karelin and the radical tendency of the Gordin brothers. The former represented the line of Peter Kropotkin, the latter group being adherents of Mikhail Bakunin. As the capital of Russia was shifted from Petrograd to Moscow, the Moscow newspaper Anarkhiia replaced Burevestnik as the most important anarchist communist publication in the country.

In the midst of the ongoing Russian Revolution, Burevestnik called for immediate expropriation of private property. It advocated that the homeless and the poor should appropriate homes themselves. In a February 1918 article (which was cited in The New York Times), Burevestnik appealed to hall guards to stop protecting the rich and allow the poor to take control over the latter's residences and palaces.

It pleaded to the Petrograd workers to reject the leadership of the Bolsheviks. For example, in an April 1918 article it compared the Bolsheviks to the Black Hundreds. The article, published on the front page, carried the title "We have come to the limit!". It denounced attacks on the anarchist movement. However, the newspaper also rejected the parliamentary factions (Mensheviks, Cadets, SRs, etc.). The newspaper applauded the dissolution of the Constituent Assembly in January 1918.

Burevestnik was closed down in May 1918.
