= Burevestnik (Tiflis, 1917) =

- Founded: 1917
- Ceased publication: 1917
- Political alignment: Marxist
- Language: Russian language
- Headquarters: Tiflis

Burevestnik (Russian: Буревестник) was a Russian language Bolshevik newspaper published from Tbilisi (Tiflis), Georgia in 1917.

It was one of the most important Bolshevik organs in the city at the time.
