= Melkonov-Yezekov House =

Coordinates: 47°13′22″N 39°43′08″E

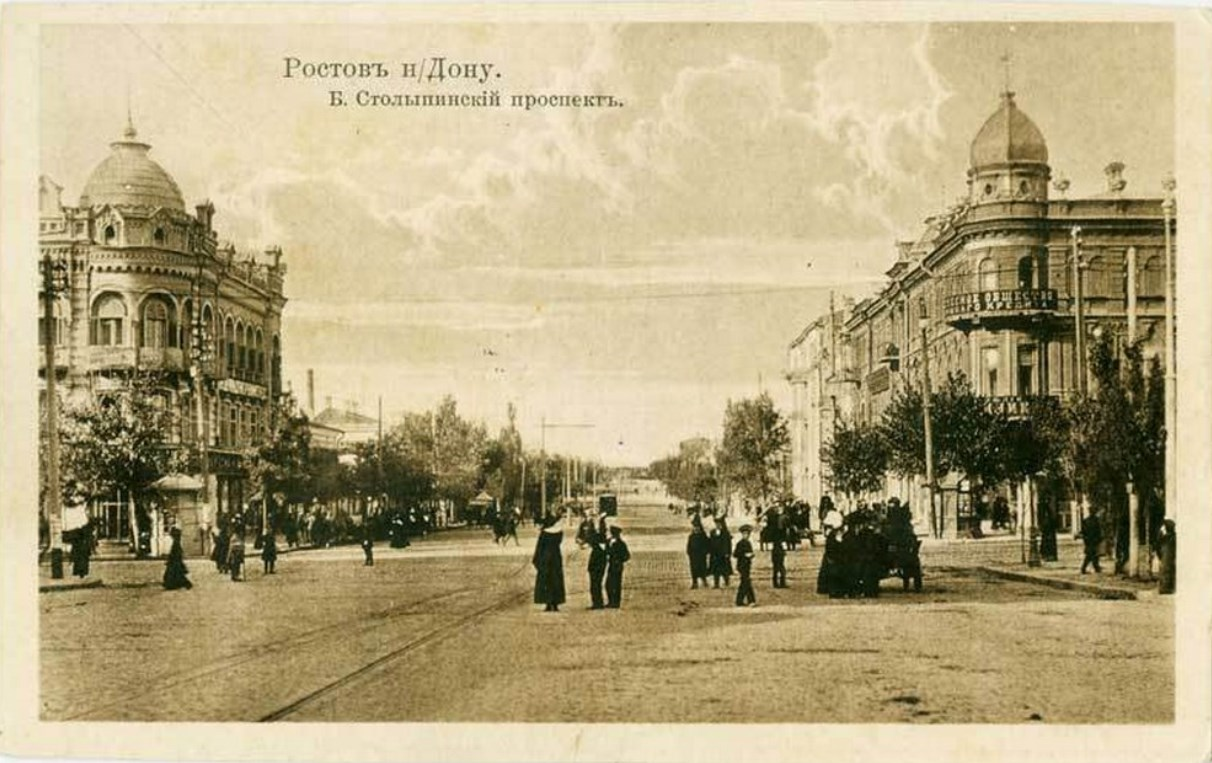
Melkonov-Yezekov House (on the right), Chernov House (on the left)

The Melkonov-Yezekov House (Russian: Дом Мелконова-Езекова, romanized: Dom Melkonova-Yezekova) was a building in the centre of Rostov-on-Don, Russia. The house was located at 71 Bolshaya Sadovaya Street, at its intersection with Bolshoy Stolypinsky Avenue (now Voroshilovsky Avenue). Constructed in the late 19th century, it was a revenue house, housing commercial premises and apartments. It was destroyed in 1942, during the Second World War.

== History ==
The Melkonov-Yezekov House was built in the late 19th century. Its owner was famous Rostov and Nakhichevan woollen merchant Gavriil Melkonov-Yezekov. An urban legend originated from the construction of the building. Two merchants, the horse breeder Karapet Chernov and the woollen trader Melkonov-Yezekov, allegedly made a bet over which one of them was richer. They each decided to build as luxurious a revenue house as possible, facing each other on Bolshaya Sadovaya Street.

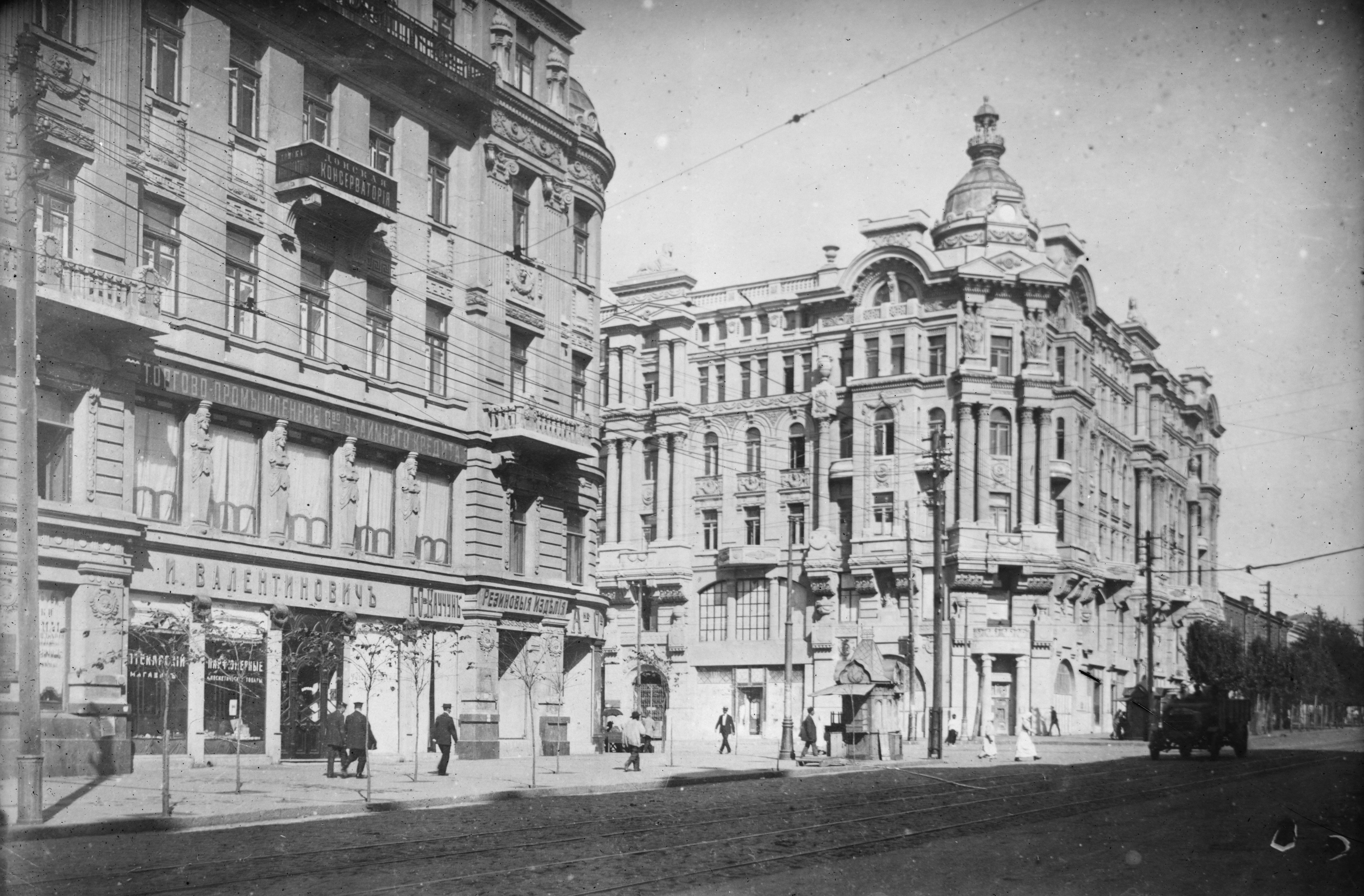
Melkonov-Yezekov House (on the right), Chernov House (on the left) in 1919

The Melkonov-Yezekov House was originally designed with three floors, but when a construction boom began in Rostov at the beginning of the 20th century, both merchants decided to build their houses up to five floors. The Beaux-Arts Melkonov-Yezekov House was crowned with a round tower, which in turn was topped by a spire.

The building was redesigned in the Art Nouveau style in the early 20th century. It was recognized as a historical landmark, second only in its decorative detail to the Rostov-on-Don City Hall. The building housed the Rostov-on-Don social club during the early 20th century.

During the Soviet era, the cinema "Kolizey" was located on the ground floor. The poet Sergei Yesenin performed in the cinema hall in the early 1920s. In the 1930s, the building was occupied by the Rostov Azov-Black Sea Committee for Radio Broadcasting and Radiocommunication of the Rostoblispolkom, and the "Udarnik" cinema. There were also shops on the ground floor, and residential apartments on the upper floors.

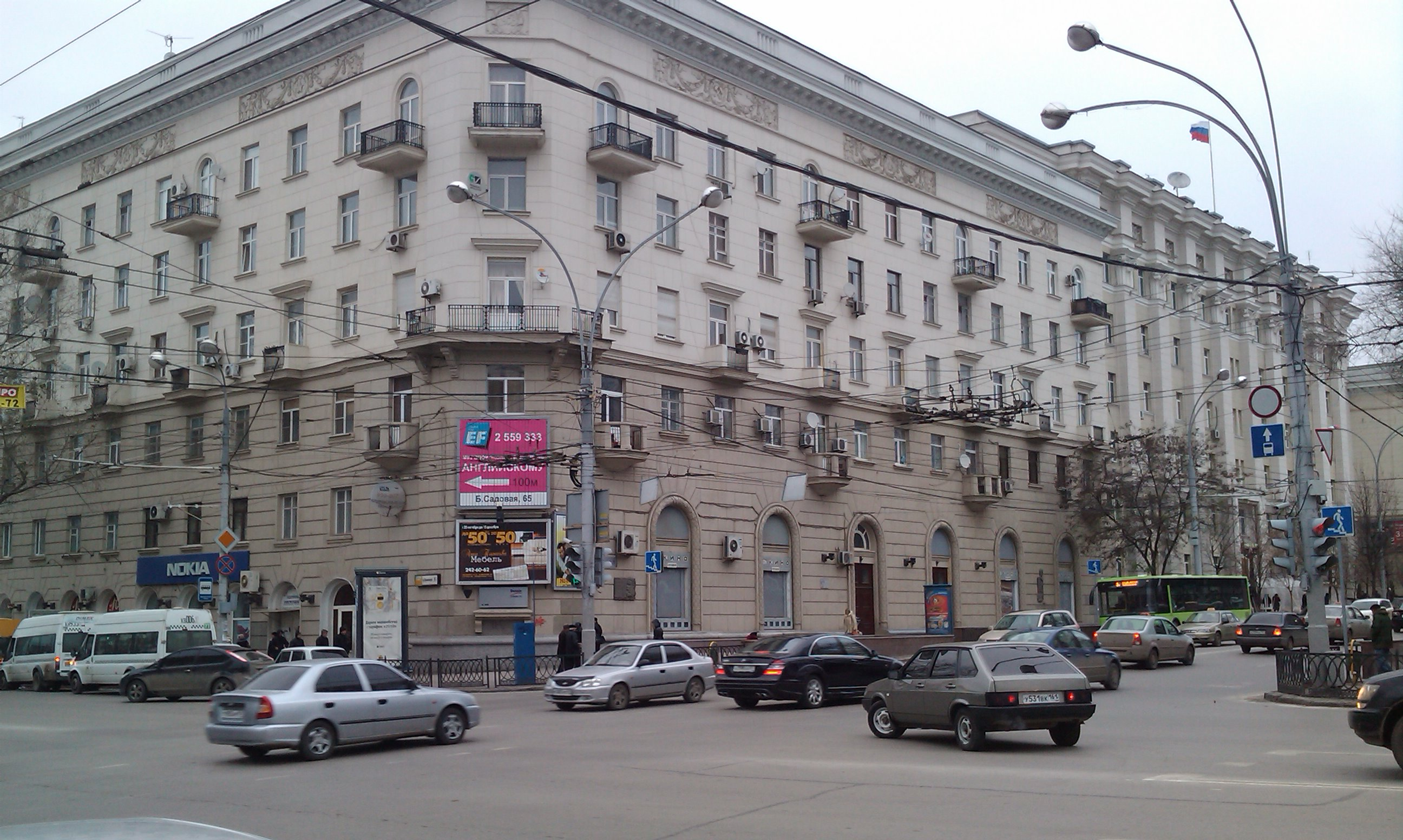
The Stalinist Empire style building on the site of the former Melkonov-Yezekov House

In 1942, during the Second World War, an aerial bomb hit the Melkonov-Yezekov house, partially destroying the building. The resulting fire led to its complete destruction. After the war, the remains of the building were dismantled, the remaining brick was used for the construction of a residential building in the Stalinist Empire style on the same site.
