= Burevestnik (film) =

2004 Russian animated film

Burevestnik is a 2004 Russian short comedy hand-drawn animated film directed by Aleksey Turkus. It is a humorous absurdist rendering of the recitation of the revolutionary poem The Song of the Stormy Petrel by Maxim Gorky at a lesson of Russian literature at school.

== Plot ==
The lesson begins with a scene of tardy students with stereotypical surnames Ivanov, Petrov, Sidorov each say that their trolley broke down. After some mischief during the lesson, an excellent student girl starts reciting the verse, with pathos. Suddenly the classroom changes to reflect the content of the verse: a "stormy petrel" (resembling a goose, however) appears over teacher's table, stormy clouds are looming, lightning bolts are flashing. The students and the teacher struggle with "stormy waters". The riot of the elements ends with the school bell ringing. Suddenly grotesque figures of Maxim Gorky and another Russian classic, Alexander Pushkin appear and start quarreling and fighting. Despite their exaggerated stereotypical images, the teacher does not recognize them and expels from the class.

== Awards ==
- 2004: 9th International Moscow Festival of Children's Animated Films "Goldfish": Special Jury Prize "For the Funniest Film"
- 2005: 10th Anniversary Open Russian Animated Film Festival, formerly "Tarusa", now "Suzdal" — Diploma "For a Demonstration Lesson in Mischief" and the Audience Choice Award
- 2005: XIII Russian Film Festival "Window to Europe" in Vyborg: the Silver Boat Prize in the Animation section
