= Burevestnik-24 =

Russian experimental civil piston engine ground-effect vehicle

General information
- Type: Ground effect aircraft
- Manufacturer: "Nebo plus more" (Sky and Sea)
- Designer: Vladimir Bukovsky
- Number built: 6

History
- Introduction date: 2004
- First flight: 9 July 2004

Burevestnik-24 is a Russian experimental civil piston engine ground-effect vehicle (GEV) of an original design. The project authors classify it as an "amphibious vehicle" that, in their opinion, should facilitate its certification as a marine vessel and hence make the project more profitable.

== General Information ==
The vehicle's construction differs from the traditional GEA's scheme which uses under-wing airflow from the engines located in front. Designers of "Burevestnik-24" used a biplane scheme with the engines which are located on the top wing, facing rearwards with pushing propellers.

The power unit consists of two V12 AviaSmart piston engines of 412 hp each. The digital control system of the power unit increases fuel efficiency and also synchronizes the drag of two propellers.

The 8-blade pushing propellers placed in ring channels are made of carbon.

GEA consists of modules, and in unassembled form may be put into a standard sea container.

As of 2012 it is located in Mytischi, the Moscow region.

== History of development ==
A 16-seated model for testing of hydrodynamic devices was the first one; then a 20-seated model was created. The 24-seated Burevestnik is the 3rd stage. According to project managers, a 100-seated amphibian should form the 4th stage, however no messages have been reported neither in the press nor at the manufacturer's site.

== Technical data ==
Model: Burevestnik-24 Crew: 1-2 persons Passengers: 24 persons Weight: 4000 kg Payload: 3500 kg Cruising speed: above 200 km/h Operational range: 1200 km Power unit:
