= Burevestnik (Minsk, 1917) =

- Type: Daily
- Founded: October 1917
- Political alignment: Marxist
- Headquarters: Petrograd

Burevestnik (Russian: Буревестник) was a newspaper published daily from Minsk, Belarus, Russian Partition.

== History ==
Burevestnik was the organ of the Minsk Bolsheviks. Burevestnik first appeared in October 1917, two days after the Bolshevik organ Molot had been suppressed by the Russian Provisional Government. Its masthead included the motto "Workers of the world, unite!".carried articles by Vladimir Lenin. Issue no. 3 (published on October 11, 1917) carried the article The Crisis Has Matured, issue no. 8 (October 17, 1917) included The Nationalisation of the Banks whilst Lenin's A Letter to Comrades was published in parts in issues 13-16. These articles laid out the Bolshevik programme of action in Belarus.

Burevestnik continued to be published up to the victory of the October Revolution.
