= Burevestnik (1920) =

1920 Ukrainian newspaper

- Founded: 1920?
- Political alignment: Anarchist
- Language: Russian language
- Headquarters: Odesa
- OCLC number: 62297542

Burevestnik (Russian: Буревестник) was a Russian language anarchist periodical issued from Odesa, Ukraine in 1920.
