= Burevestnik (1921) =

- Founded: 1921
- Ceased publication: 1922
- Political alignment: Anarchist
- Language: Russian language
- Headquarters: New York City

Burevestnik (Russian: Буревестник, The Petrel) was a Russian language anarchist periodical published in New York City from 1921 to 1922.

== Publication history ==
Burevestnik (The Petrel) was first issued in New York City in 1921. It was published by the Group of Anarchist Communists. Victor Bondarenko was one of the main editors of the publication.

The third issue of Burevestnik was published in December 1921, and the fourth issue in January 1922.
