= Cape Jules =

Headland of Antarctica

Coordinates: 66°44′S 140°55′E

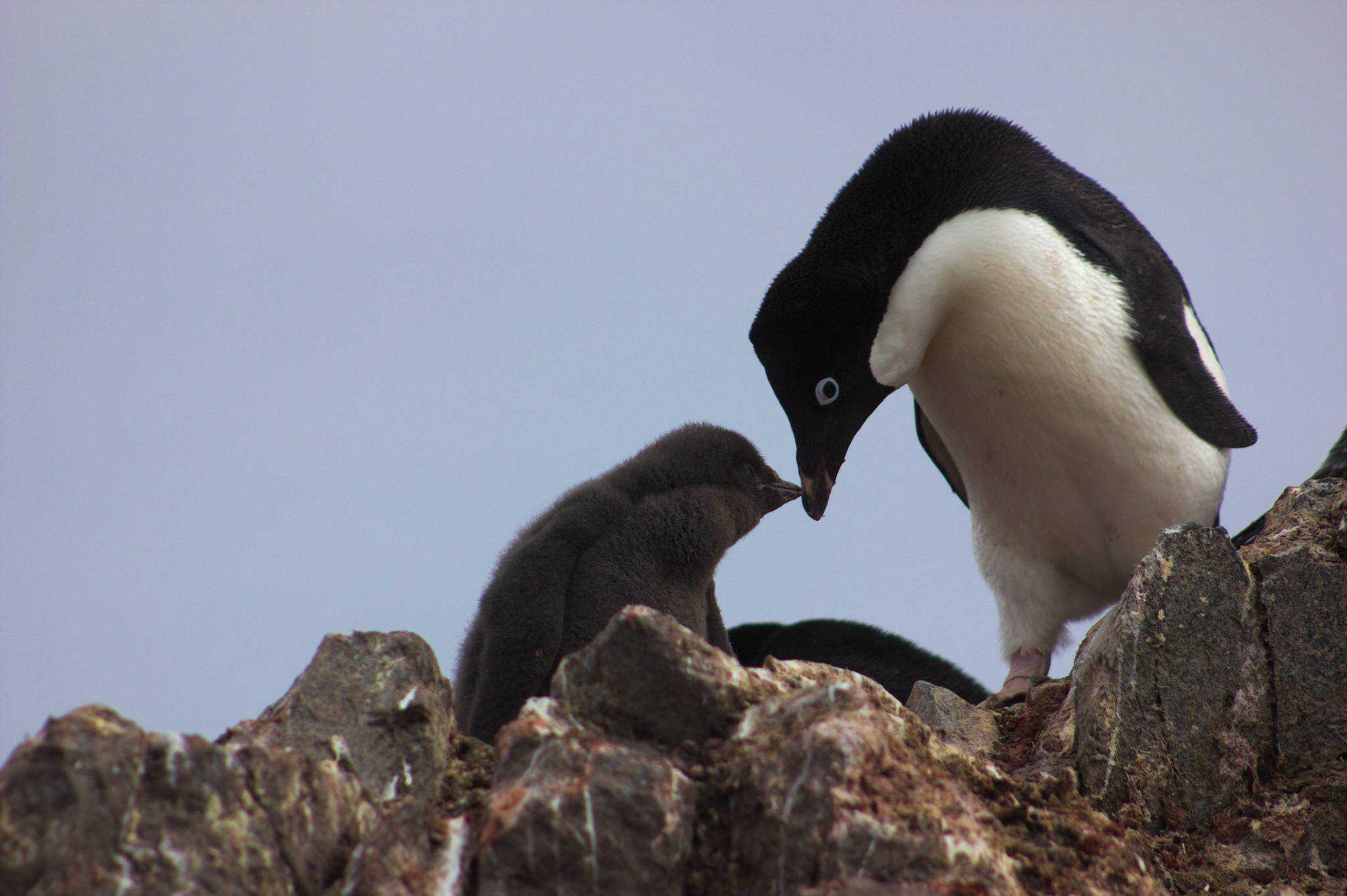
Adélie penguins breed in the IBA

Cape Jules is a rocky cape with a small cove along its northern end, 3 nautical miles (6 km) west of Zelee Glacier Tongue, Antarctica. It was discovered and named by the French expedition under Dumont d'Urville, 1837–40. Jules is the given name of the discoverer, Captain Jules Dumont d'Urville, as well as his son. The area was charted by the Australasian Antarctic Expedition in 1912–13, and again by the British Australian and New Zealand Antarctic Research Expedition in 1931, both under Mawson. The French Antarctic Expedition under Michel Barre established astronomical control at this locality in 1951.

== Important Bird Area ==
An 112 ha site comprising all the ice-free ground at the cape has been identified as an Important Bird Area (IBA) by BirdLife International because it supports a colony of about 56,000 Adélie penguins (as estimated from 2011 satellite imagery).
