= Joseph Ray Hodgson =

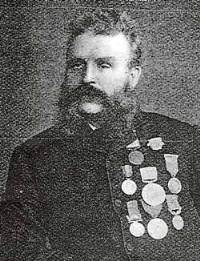

Joseph Ray Hodgson (3 October 1829 – 15 October 1908) was an Englishman hailed as a hero dozens of times after risking his life to save people from drowning, often during a winter storm in the North Sea. He was nicknamed "The Stormy Petrel", after the storm petrel seabird, because whenever a gale blew up, he could be seen on Sunderland pier searching the skyline for ships in distress in order that he might help. Hodgson was living and working in Sunderland at the same time as the diver, Harry Watts, who was also famed for saving lives.

== Early life ==
The son of a joiner, he was born in 1829 in Dunning Street, Bishopwearmouth, and was educated at The Gray School, Sunderland. By the age of 10, he was working with a gang of riggers on the ships but spent his spare time painting and carving wood; perhaps the former was less successful as he was proved to be colour blind. Hodgson made his first recorded rescue in 1844, at the age of 14, jumping into the River Wear to save three-year-old John Snowdon, who later became a renowned ship's captain. Hodgson was rewarded by the Royal Humane Society. He then saved John Nicholson, also in 1844, and pulled carver John Marshall from the Wear in 1847. Marshall repaid Hodgson by training him as a carver and gilder, which became his profession.

== Career ==
Hodgson carved a couple of figureheads for James Laing ship builder, for the Ayres Quay for £2.0.0 and the Jane for £4.10.0 in 1853. Four other orders which followed in 1854 were recorded as "steering wheel" at prices which ranged from £2.10.0 to £4.10.0. The records of the Doxford yard show that he carved figureheads for them in 1855 and 1856 for two ships. It was reported in the Newcastle Journal of 15 August 1861 that he joined the Royal Navy Reserve at Sunderland.

With the dominance of iron ships, Hodgson’s search for work took him to London at the age of 40, to Wapping, where he worked for the West African Shipping Company and as a model maker for a firm of boat builders in Limehouse between 1867–1888. However, he continued to save lives, including that of an interpreter during a voyage to Africa and as a volunteer fireman stationed at Walworth. He travelled the world, working on harbour-related projects, and claimed to have saved lives wherever he was, from Australia to Mogador, but also to have escaped death after being shot and stabbed by a Moor in Africa.

== Life saving ==
As well as rescuing individuals from drowning, Hodgson was instrumental in rescuing the crews of 15 ships in six years, as part of a team of volunteers using life boats or a Breeches buoy, usually carrying the rocket lines or hawser.

His recorded rescues include: Joseph Alexander, who was knocked overboard by a keel's tiller in 1847; William Cornage (or Carnegie), a seaman who fell into the river in 1847; John McTeen (or McTun/ McLean), washed from a lifeboat following a shipwreck in 1849; the crew of the ship Thomas Clarkson in 1852; the crews of the Medina and the Harmony in January 1854; the captain's wife and her baby from the sinking Samuel and Sarah in 1854; a cabin boy from the wrecked Niagara, as well as the crews of the Victoria, Coldstream, Calypso and Margaret – all in 1854; the master of the brig Brenda in 1855; the crew of the Maddalena in September 1856; the crews of the Rienzi, the schooner Isabella and the Six Sisters in 1857; the crews of the Blucher and the Poulton in 1858; Jacob Cresswell, of Wreckenton, saved from drowning in the sea at Short Sands, Tynemouth, 1857 (26 July); the crews of the James Bales and of the French schooner Les Trois Soeurs in 1857; a man pulled from the river at Cox Green, Sunderland 1869; John Dean, son of a pilot, from the Regent's Canal Docks in 1872.

A description of his daring rescue of the crew of Les Trois Soeurs appeared in the Penny Illustrated Paper (1864). It was remarkable because Hodgson, realising the French crew didn't understand the meaning of the flares and rocket lines, tied a rope around his waist and swam out through the squall to the ship, managing to clamber aboard and assist all the crew to shore. His deeds were also recorded in The Illustrated London News (1858) and he was included in a book called Everyday Heroes published by SPCK in 1889 which aimed to inspire its readers and promote good deeds or, at least, proper behaviour.

He wrote a pamphlet describing life-saving methods, which was widely published, including in the Newcastle Journal (1859) and the Lifeboat Journal (1858) and he also gave demonstrations of his skills.

=== Life raft patent ===
In 1869 he applied for a patent for a design for a life raft but the Stamp Duty fee of £50 was never paid so that the patent became void in 1872. However, in conjunction with Illius Timmis, he brought out a reversible lifeboat, the Timmis-Hodgson, for which silver medals were granted at the North East Coast Exhibition at Tynemouth in 1882, and at the International Fisheries Exhibition in 1883. These boats met with the approval of the Admiralty, Trinity House, and the Board of Trade officials, before whom experiments were carried out, including a competition off the coast of Brighton with the RNLI boat ‘The Rescue’, as illustrated by W Overton for the Illustrated London News, Dec 1886.

=== Medals ===
The Sunderland yearbook of 1910 reports that Hodgson had garnered 2 gold medals and 5 silver medals during his lifetime. The local records of events (pub July 1866) report that on 16 January 1856 "Joseph Hodgson, carver, Sunderland, received the silver medal of the Royal National Lifeboat Institution in testimony of his extraordinary exertions at saving life, extending over a period of twelve years. He had personally rescued 10 persons from drowning and assisted, in life and other boats, in saving 17 others. He had always declined any pecuniary considerations for his service but was very solicitous to possess the medal of the old and valuable institution…" In London his rescue of a young man from the Regent's Canal Docks in 1872 resulted in a bronze Royal Humane Society medal. In 1883, he accepted an invitation to return to Sunderland to be presented with a gold medal from the mayor on 11 September in the Mayor’s Chamber. He turned down an offer of £5 but was proudly photographed wearing his medals. Hodgson was rewarded handsomely for his most notable rescue, that of Les Trois Soeurs: as well as a gift of a gold watch from the ship's captain, he received a silver medal from the Board of Trade and a gold one from Emperor Napoleon III of France. Hodgson’s silver Board of Trade medal was auctioned in September 2008.

== Later life ==
In 1850 Hodgson married Esther Copeland Sloan, also of Bishopswearmouth, in Durham. They had 11 children together. They moved to London in 1860 and lived in various addresses around the East End and Poplar. He is listed in the 1901 census as being a carpenter, carver and employer. He and his wife left London for Australia during the docks disputes of the 1880s, where Esther died in 1895. He returned to Limehouse and remarried – at the age of 70 – to Elizabeth Nimmo, a woman 14 years his junior. But, despite his fame due to his many rescues, he died a poor man – forced to pawn his 8 bravery medals to survive. He spent his last few years in lodgings in Suffolk Street, Poplar – the same street that Will Crooks, Labour MP and former mayor of Poplar, was born. Crooks visited the old man in 1908, and wrote to the Carnegie Hero Fund on his behalf; but in vain, as "The Stormy Petrel" died of pneumonia later that same year.
