= The Song of the Stormy Petrel =

Russian revolutionary piece written in 1901 by Maxim Gorky

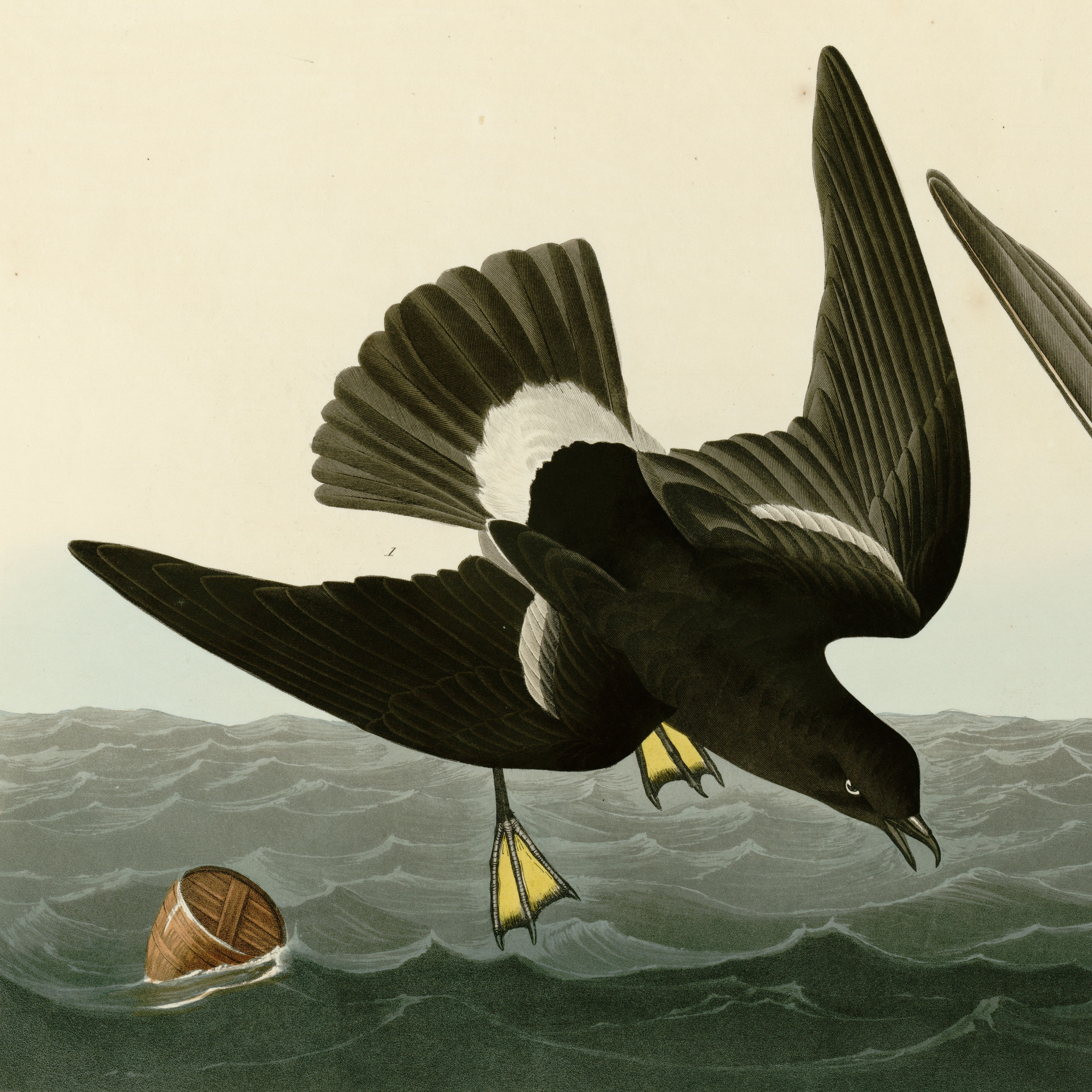
Stormy Petrel, painted by John James Audubon

"The Song of the Stormy Petrel" (Russian: Песня о Буревестнике, Pesnya o Burevestnike/Pesńa o Burevestnike) is a short piece of revolutionary literature written by the Russian writer Maxim Gorky in 1901. The poem is written in a variation of unrhymed trochaic tetrameter with occasional Pyrrhic substitutions.

== History ==
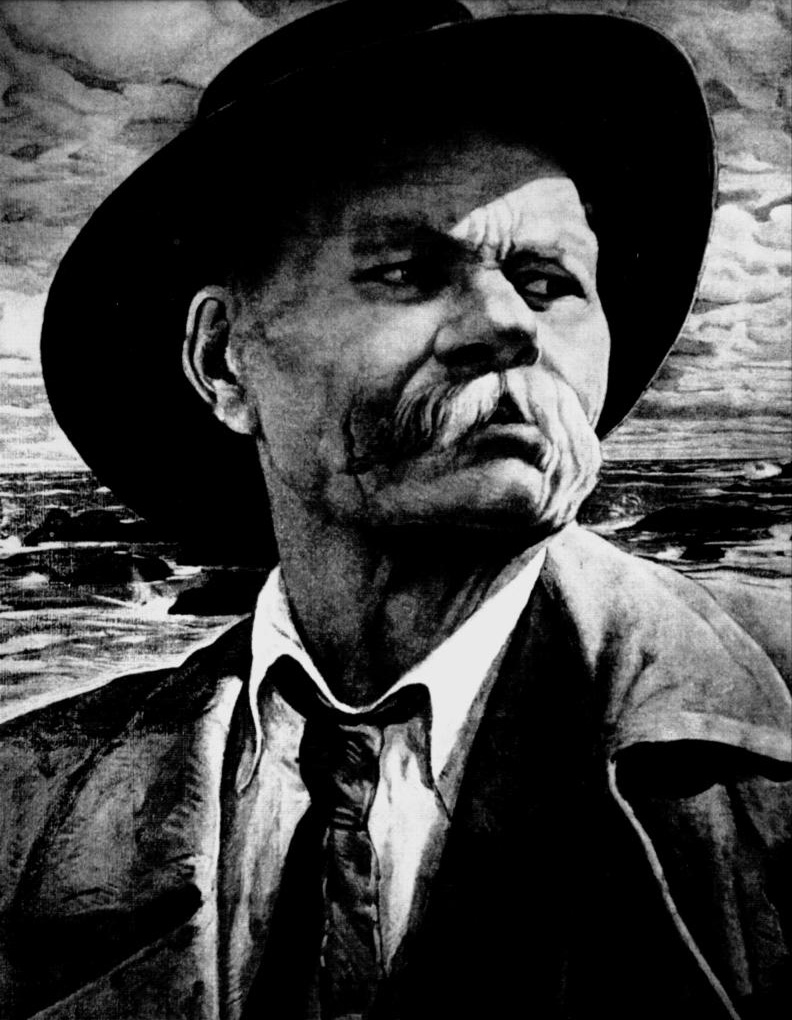
Artistic rendering of Gorky late in life

In 1901, direct criticism of the Tsar was considered ill-advised. "Aesopian language" of a fable, which had been developed into a form of art by earlier writers such as Mikhail Saltykov-Shchedrin, was not infrequently used by the critics of the regime.

Maxim Gorky wrote "The Song of the Storm Petrel" in March 1901 in Nizhny Novgorod. It is believed that originally the text was part of a larger piece, called "Spring Melodies" (Весенние мелодии) and subtitled "Fantasy" (Фантазия). In this "fantasy", the author overhears a conversation of birds outside his window on a late-winter day: a crow, a raven, and a bullfinch representing the monarchist establishment; sparrows, "lesser people"; and anti-establishment siskins (чижики). As the birds are discussing the approach of spring, one of the siskins sings to his comrades "the Song of the Stormy Petrel, which he had overheard somewhere", which appears as the "fantasy's" finale. In the "Song", the action takes place on an ocean coast, far from the streets of a central Russian town; the language calling for revolution is coded—the proud stormy petrel, unafraid of the storm (that is, revolution), as all other birds cower.

The publication of this parody of Russian society was disallowed by the censors; however, apparently because of a censor's mistake, the siskin's "Song" was allowed to be published as a separate piece. The entire "fantasy" was published in Berlin in 1902.

The "Song" was first published in the Zhizn magazine in April 1901. Gorky was arrested for publishing "The Song", but released shortly thereafter.

The poem was later referred to as "the battle anthem of the revolution", and the epithet Burevestnik Revolyutsii (The Storm Petrel of the Revolution) soon became attached to Gorky himself. According to Nadezhda Krupskaya, "The Song" became one of Lenin's favorite works by Gorky.

== The bird species in the song ==
As a poet, Gorky would not have paid too much attention to precisely identifying the birds species appearing in his "Song". The Russian word burevestnik (modified by appropriate adjectives) is applied to a number of species in the order Procellariiformes. According to Vladimir Dal's Dal's Dictionary, Russia's favorite dictionary in Maxim Gorky's time, burevestnik could be understood as a generic word for all members of the family Procellariidae and Hydrobatidae (including the European storm petrel). This Russian word is not, however, used to specifically name any species properly known in English as storm petrel. However, since the Russian burevestnik can be literally parsed by the speaker as 'the announcer of the storm', it was only appropriate for most translators into English to translate the title of the poem as "Stormy Petrel" (or, more rarely, "Storm Petrel").

Other avian characters of the poem are generic seagulls, loons (also known as "divers"; Russian, гагара), and a penguin.

== Translations ==
The Song was translated into many languages (and to almost all officially recognized languages of Russia), including German, Japanese, and Hebrew.

== The text of the poem ==
The text in original Russian and English translation follows (the English translation is GFDL; note on translation on the discussion page).

Над седой равниной моря ветер тучи собирает. Между тучами и морем гордо реет Буревестник, чёрной молнии подобный.

То крылом волны касаясь, то стрелой взмывая к тучам, он кричит, и — тучи слышат радость в смелом крике птицы.

В этом крике — жажда бури! Силу гнева, пламя страсти и уверенность в победе слышат тучи в этом крике.

Чайки стонут перед бурей, — стонут, мечутся над морем и на дно его готовы спрятать ужас свой пред бурей.

И гагары тоже стонут, — им, гагарам, недоступно наслажденье битвой жизни: гром ударов их пугает.

Глупый пингвин робко прячет тело жирное в утёсах... Только гордый Буревестник реет смело и свободно над седым от пены морем!

Всё мрачней и ниже тучи опускаются над морем, и поют, и рвутся волны к высоте навстречу грому.

Гром грохочет. В пене гнева стонут волны, с ветром споря. Вот охватывает ветер стаи волн объятьем крепким и бросает их с размаху в дикой злобе на утёсы, разбивая в пыль и брызги изумрудные громады.

Буревестник с криком реет, чёрной молнии подобный, как стрела пронзает тучи, пену волн крылом срывает.

Вот он носится, как демон, — гордый, чёрный демон бури, — и смеётся, и рыдает... Он над тучами смеётся, он от радости рыдает!

В гневе грома, — чуткий демон, — он давно усталость слышит, он уверен, что не скроют тучи солнца, — нет, не скроют!

Ветер воет... Гром грохочет...

Синим пламенем пылают стаи туч над бездной моря. Море ловит стрелы молний и в своей пучине гасит. Точно огненные змеи, вьются в море, исчезая, отраженья этих молний.

— Буря! Скоро грянет буря!

Это смелый Буревестник гордо реет между молний над ревущим гневно морем; то кричит пророк победы:

— Пусть сильнее грянет буря!..

Up above the sea's grey flatland, wind is gathering the clouds. In between the sea and clouds proudly soaring the Petrel, reminiscent of black lightning.

Glancing a wave with his wingtip, like an arrow dashing cloudward, he cries out and the clouds hear his joy in the bird's cry of courage.

In this cry — thirst for the tempest! Wrathful power, flame of passion, certainty of being victorious the clouds hear in that bird's cry.

Seagulls groan before the tempest, — groan, and race above the sea, and on its bottom they are ready to hide their fear of the storm.

And the loons are also groaning, — they, the loons, they cannot access the delight of life in battle: the noise of the clashes scares them.

The dumb penguin shyly hiding his fat body in the crevice . . . It is only the proud Petrel who soars ever bold and freely over the sea grey with sea foam!

Ever darker, clouds descending ever lower over the sea, and the waves are singing, racing to the sky to meet the thunder.

Thunder sounds. In foamy anger the waves groan, with wind in conflict. Now the wind firmly embraces flocks of waves and sends them crashing on the cliffs in wild fury, smashing into dust and seaspray all these mountains of emerald.

And the Petrel soars with warcries, reminiscent of black lightning, like an arrow piercing the clouds, with his wing rips foam from the waves.

So he dashes, like a demon, —proud, black demon of the tempest, — and he's laughing and he's weeping . . . it is at the clouds he's laughing, it is with his joy he's weeping!

In the fury of the thunder, the wise demon hears its weakness, and he's certain that the clouds will not hide the sun — won't hide it!

The wind howls . . . the thunder rolls . . .

Like a blue flame, flocks of clouds blaze up above the sea's abyss. The sea catches bolts of lightning drowning them beneath its waters. Just like serpents made of fire, they weave in the water, fading, the reflections of this lightning.

—Tempest! Soon will strike the tempest!

That is the courageous Petrel proudly soaring in the lightning over the sea's roar of fury; cries of victory the prophet:

—Let the tempest come strike harder!

== Commemoration ==
The popularity of the poem in Russia's revolutionary circles, and the later "canonization" of Gorky as a preeminent classic of the "proletarian literature" ensured the wide spreading of the image of the Burevestnik ("stormy petrel") in the Soviet propaganda imagery. A variety of institutions, products, and publications would bear the name "Burevestnik", including a national sports club, a series of hydrofoil boats, an air base in the Kuril Islands, a labor-union resort on the Gorky Reservoir, a Moscow-Nizhny Novgorod express train, and even a brand of candy. (See Burevestnik for a very partial list of entities so named). Naturally, Burevestnik-themed names were especially popular in Gorky Oblast.

Maxim Gorky himself would be referred to with the epithet "the Stormy Petrel of the Revolution" (Буревестник Революции); monuments, posters, postage stamps and commemorative coins depicting the writer would often be decorated with the image of a soaring aquatic bird.

== See also ==
- Burevestnik (animated film), a humorous rendering of the recitation of the verse at school
