= Anarchism in Ukraine =

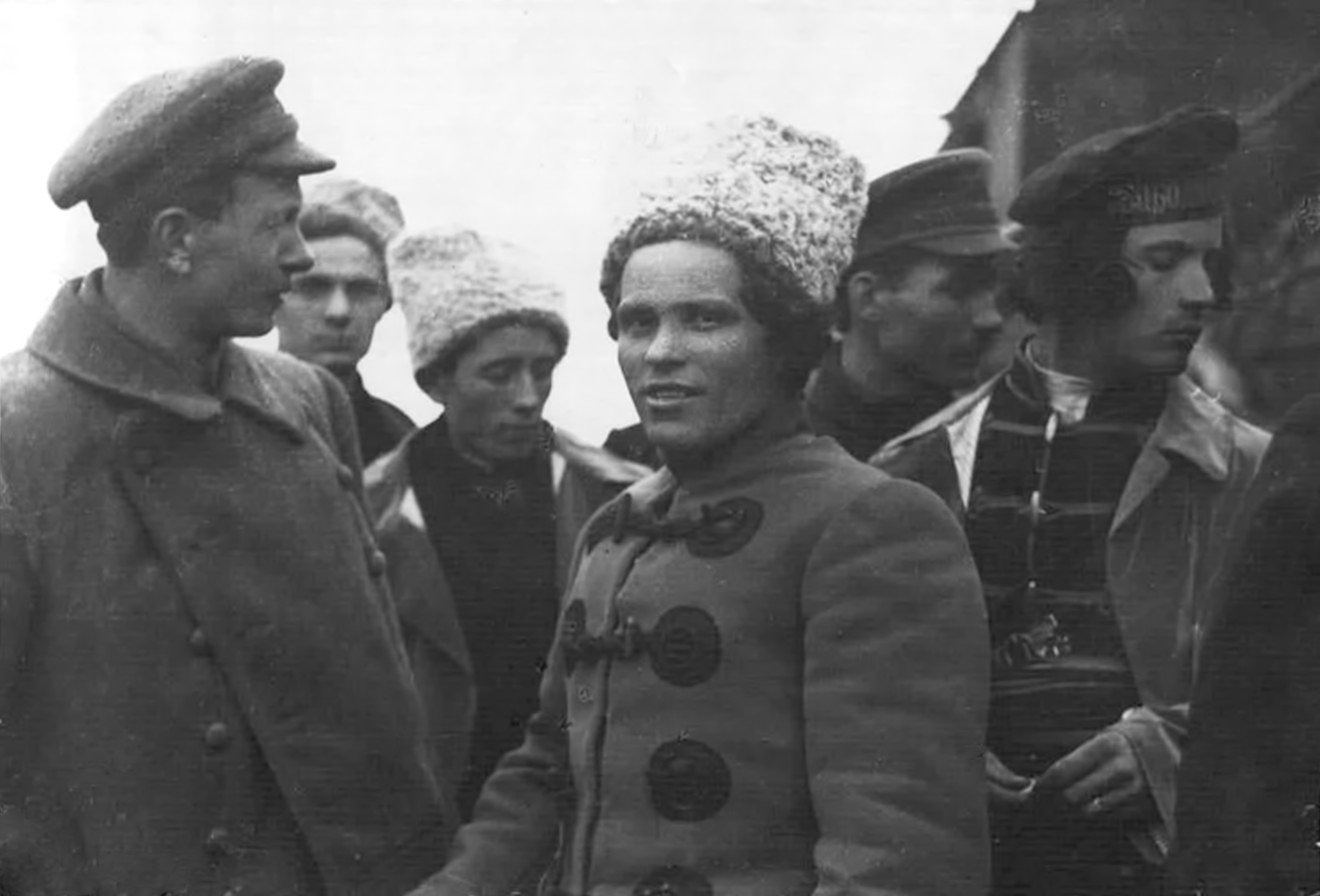
Commanders of the Revolutionary Insurgent Army of Ukraine, including Semen Karetnyk (3rd from the left), Nestor Makhno (centre), and Fedir Shchus (1st from the right)

Anarchism in Ukraine has its roots in the democratic and egalitarian organization of the Zaporozhian Cossacks, who inhabited the region up until the 18th century. Philosophical anarchism first emerged from the radical movement during the Ukrainian national revival, finding a literary expression in the works of Mykhailo Drahomanov, who was himself inspired by the libertarian socialism of Pierre-Joseph Proudhon. The spread of populist ideas by the Narodniks also lay the groundwork for the adoption of anarchism by Ukraine's working classes, gaining notable circulation in the Jewish communities of the Pale of Settlement.

By the outbreak of the 1905 Revolution, a specifically anarchist movement had risen to prominence in Ukraine. The ideas of anarcho-communism, anarcho-syndicalism and individualist anarchism all took root in Ukrainian revolutionary circles, with syndicalism itself developing a notably strong hold in Odesa, while acts of anarchist terrorism by cells such as the Black Banner became more commonplace. After the revolution was suppressed, Ukrainian anarchism began to reorganize itself, culminating in the outburst following the February Revolution, when Nestor Makhno returned to the country and began to organize among the peasantry.

Ukraine became a stronghold of anarchism during the revolutionary period, acting as a counterweight to Ukrainian nationalism, Russian imperialism and Bolshevism. The Revolutionary Insurgent Army of Ukraine (RIAU), led by Makhno, carved out an anarchist territory in the south-east of the country, centered in the former cossack lands of Zaporizhzhia. By 1921, the Ukrainian anarchist movement was defeated by the Bolsheviks, who established the Ukrainian Soviet Socialist Republic in its place.

Anarchism experienced a brief resurgence in Ukraine during the time of the New Economic Policy, but was again defeated following the rise of totalitarianism under the rule of Joseph Stalin. Further expressions of anarchism existed in the breach of Soviet Ukrainian history, before finally reemerging onto the public sphere following the dissolution of the Soviet Union. In the 21st century, the Ukrainian anarchist movement has experienced a resurgence, itself coming into conflict with the rising far-right following Euromaidan.

== History ==
At the western-most point of the Eurasian Steppe, the lands today known as Ukraine came under the control of a number of nomadic societies from the 5th century BCE. First came the Indo-European Scythians and Sarmatians, then the Turkic Khazars, Pechenegs and Cumans, before the migration of Slavs to the region. By the 9th century CE, these Slavs became known as the Rus and had formed a loose federation of principalities, with Kyiv as its center. The Rus were converted to Orthodox Christianity over the following century, before being invaded by the Mongol Empire, which brought about the collapse of Kyivan rule. While ruled by the Golden Horde, the northern states under the rule of Moscow became known as "Russia", while the southern borderlands came to be known as "Ukraine". After the fall of the Horde, Ukraine became a battleground between the competing Polish, Russian and Ottoman Empires, which brought about the development of a distinct Ukrainian culture.

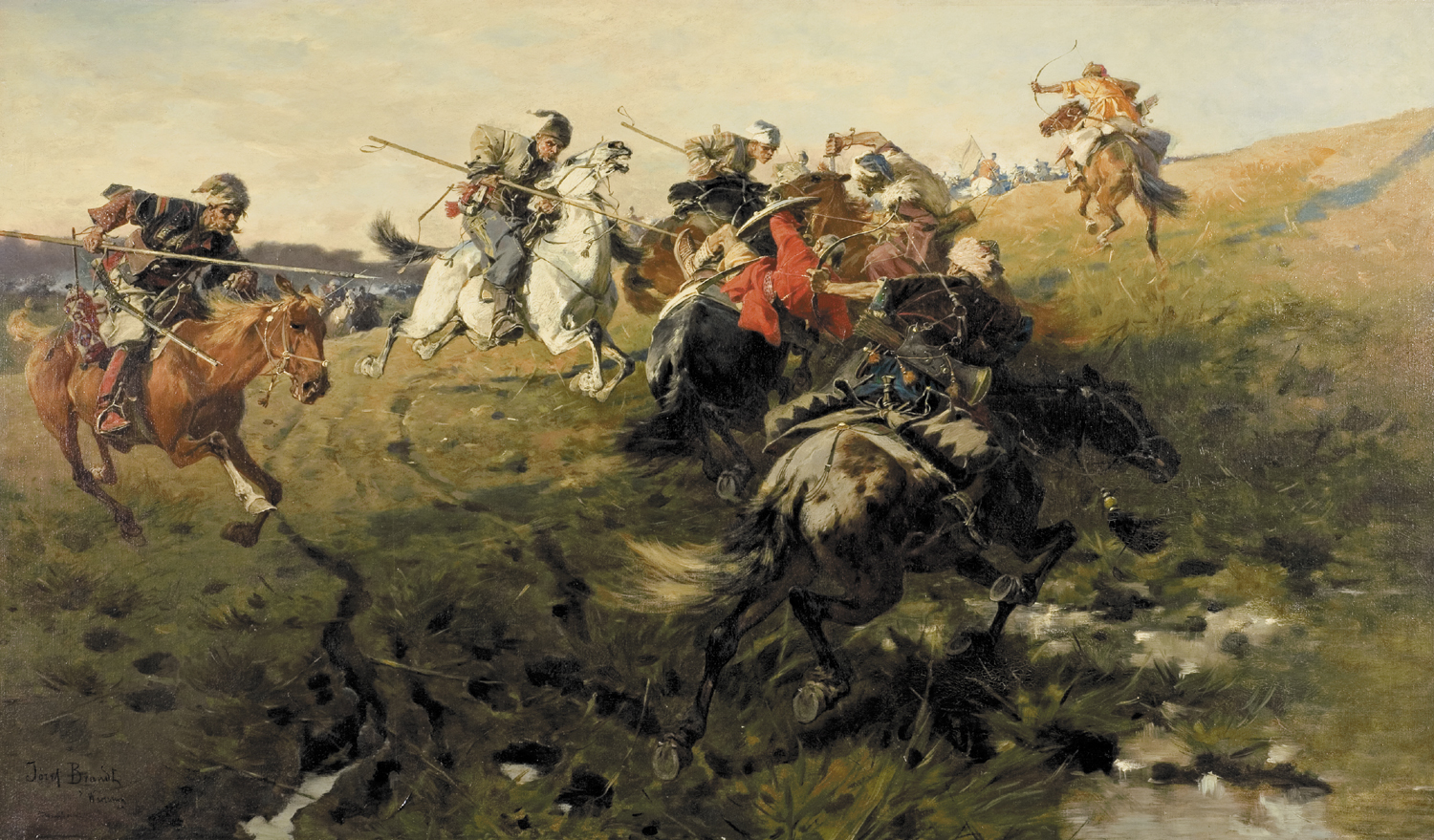
Zaporozhian Cossacks fighting Tatars of the Crimean Khanate.

By this time, the Cossacks had emerged from the conflict, establishing themselves along the banks of the Don and Dniepr rivers, where they practiced a form of participatory democracy in popular assemblies (Krugs) and elected their own military leaders (Atamans). While other cossacks would end up pledging their loyalty to one state or another, the Zaporozhian Cossacks in Ukraine were able to maintain their independence. The Zaporozhians were made up of a broad mix of peoples, including those who had fled from serfdom, who as "free Ukrainians" held their own land and were mobilized as part of the Zaporozhian host. The Ukrainian cossacks fought against the Poles, Russians and Ottomans alike, organized into decentralised regiments (polks) and squadrons (sotnias). The Zaporozhian Sich was itself organized along democratic and egalitarian lines, where military and civilian officials were all directly elected for one-year terms and subject to instant recall by the assemblies, while its land was distributed equally among the people.

Dedicated to the preservation of "Cossack freedoms", Stenka Razin led the Don Cossacks in an uprising against the Tsarist autocracy in Russia and later Yemelyan Pugachev led the Ural Cossacks in a peasants' revolt against serfdom, but both of these rebellions were defeated. The Cossack hosts were subsequently dissolved and inducted into the Imperial Russian Army, in which they became loyal soldiers of the Russian Empire, going on to play a vital role in defeating the Napoleonic invasion of 1812 and later becoming the de facto police force in Russia. Likewise, the Zaporozhian Sich was broken up and its people were forced into either serfdom or exile, with Ukraine being brought definitively under Russian imperial rule. Nevertheless, the tradition of the "libertarian-minded warrior-peasants" persisted, setting the groundwork for the libertarian communist movement in Ukraine.

=== Rising radicalism ===
Radicalism spread through Ukraine in the wake of the War of 1812, as the rise in calls for abolition of the Tsarist autocracy and serfdom led to the establishment of the Southern Society of the Decembrists in 1821. Ukrainian Decembrists were more radical than their northern counterparts, calling for the overthrow of the monarchy and its replacement with a revolutionary republic. Following the death of Alexander I, the Southern Society in Kyiv staged a revolt against the Russian Empire, but it was suppressed.

Radicalism was raised further during the Ukrainian national revival, as Brotherhoods began to advocate for Ukrainian autonomy and the replacement of the Empire with a pan-Slavic federation organized along liberal democratic lines, with Taras Shevchenko even displaying revolutionary sentiments. The Ukrainian intellectual hromadas, inspired by Russian populism, began to engage with the peasantry - leading to the rise of agrarian socialist tendencies in Ukrainian radical circles.

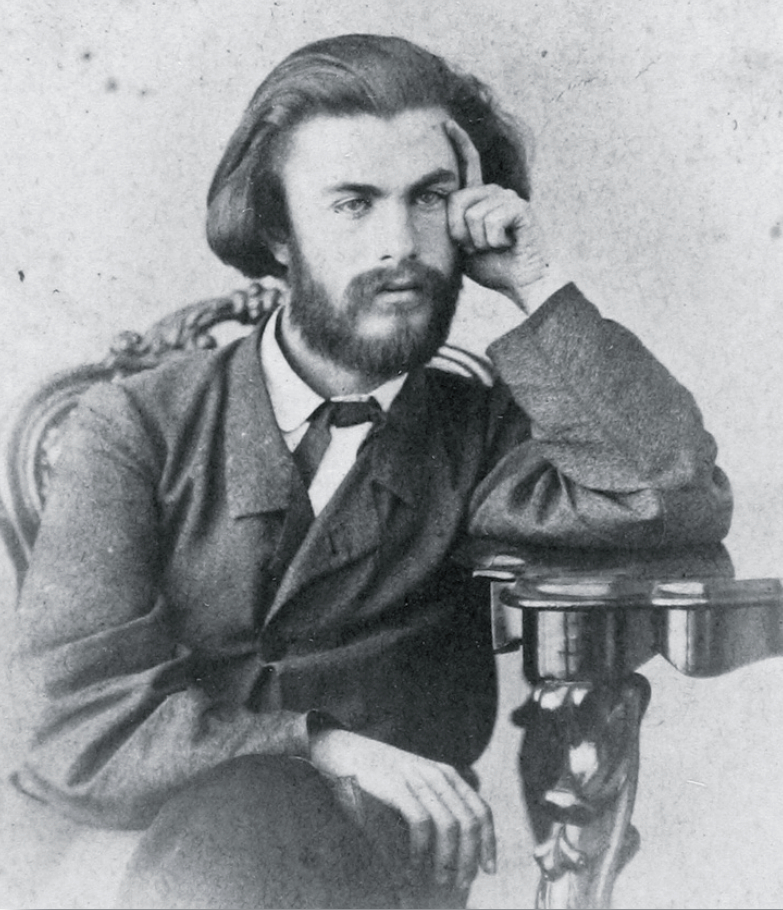
Mykhailo Drahomanov, the first Ukrainian philosophical anarchist and one of the leading figures of the democratic federalist movement.

The most prominent of the hromadas was the one in Kyiv, founded in 1859 by populist students of the Lavrovist tendency, who emphasised the education of the peasantry and rejected revolutionary agitation. It was banned by 1863 but renewed its educational activities in 1869, spearheaded by a new generation of students led by Volodymyr Antonovych, Pavlo Chubynsky and Mykhailo Drahomanov. Continuing the democratic-federalist tradition from the Decembrists and the Brotherhoods, Mykhailo Drahomanov blended together elements from liberal democracy, agrarian socialism and Ukrainian nationalism, envisioning the final goal of the democratic-federalist movement to be the achievement of anarchy, as inspired by the works of Pierre-Joseph Proudhon. Having coined the slogan "Cosmopolitanism in the ideas and the ends, nationality in the ground and the forms," Drahomanov rejected separatism due to his philosophical anarchist opposition to nation states. Viewing national liberation as "inseparable from social emancipation", he instead encouraged for the Hromada to concentrate on building a bottom-up form of democracy of small communities organized on a federative basis.

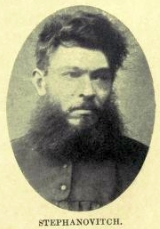
Yakov Stefanovich, leader of the Ukrainian buntars during the "Going to the People" campaign.

In 1874, the Narodniks' "Going to the People" campaign culminated in a number of Ukrainian revolutionary anarchists (buntars), led by Yakov Stefanovich, organizing a peasant revolt in Chyhyryn, before being suppressed by Russian authorities. Alexander II subsequently issued the Ems Ukaz which banned the use of the Ukrainian language, resulting in the repression of the hromadas and Drahomanov's flight into exile in Geneva, where he established the Geneva Circle, the first Ukrainian socialist organisation. Drahomanov's socialist tendencies brought him into conflict with more moderate members of the Hromada, as well as the "chauvinist" and "dictatorial" Russian revolutionaries, leaving him isolated from many of his contemporaries by 1886. In Galicia, which Drahomanov had placed at the center of the Ukrainian national struggle due to its constitutionalism, Drahomanov's disciple Ivan Franko found himself persecuted by the Austrian authorities and ostracised by local religious conservatives, due to his staunch anti-clericalism.

Nonetheless, in 1890 Franko was able to found the Ukrainian Radical Party (URP), which engaged in a number of activities including the convocation of popular assemblies, the establishment of cooperatives and the education of the peasantry. In 1895, members of the URP were elected to the Galician Diet and the Austrian parliament, by which point its party congresses were beginning to call for Ukrainian independence and endorsed a number of strikes by agricultural workers. Drahomanov's death that same year accelerated a split in the organization, between orthodox radicals that stayed loyal to Drahomanov's platform, younger social democrats that had gravitated towards Marxism and nationalists who were no longer comfortable with the party's socialist line. By losing the latter two factions, the URP took on a definitively agrarian socialist platform and grew to become the second-largest of the Ukrainian political parties in Galicia.

=== 1905 Revolution ===
Ukrainian Jews in the Pale of Settlement had been extended a number of rights during the reign of Alexander II, but following his assassination by People's Will, a wave of pogroms broke out and the new government of Alexander III implemented the May Laws, which persecuted Jews living in the Pale. In 1903, a strike in Odesa rapidly escalated into a nationwide Ukrainian general strike, with the heavy industry centers of Kyiv, Kharkiv, Mykolaiv and Katerynoslav all experiencing mass industrial action. The Minister of Interior Vyacheslav von Plehve responded to the strike wave by propagating a number of antisemitic and anti-communist conspiracy theories about the labour movement, which resulted in another wave of pogroms breaking out in Ukraine. The living conditions of Pale nourished the growth of the Ukrainian anarchist movement, which grew particularly strong in Jewish towns, where workers' circles began to educate themselves on a number of radical ideas. Dissatisfied with the existing socialist parties, activists of the General Jewish Labour Bund, Socialist Revolutionary Party and Revolutionary Ukrainian Party all deserted party politics for anarchism. The Bread and Freedom group in London organized the distribution of anarchist literature, including the Yiddish language journals Arbeter Fraynd and Germinal, throughout much of the Pale, reaching as far as the anarchist groups in Odesa and Nizhyn.

Popular discontent with the Tsarist autocracy eventually culminated in the 1905 Revolution, during which much of the country rebelled against the Russian Empire, with a general strike in October successfully securing civil liberties and the constitution of the State Duma. But workers and peasants throughout the country, having not had any of their economic demands met, continued to openly revolt against the government. During the suppression of the revolution in December, workers' uprisings broke out in Odesa, Kharkiv and Katerynoslav, but they were unsuccessful and the revolution was brought to an end.

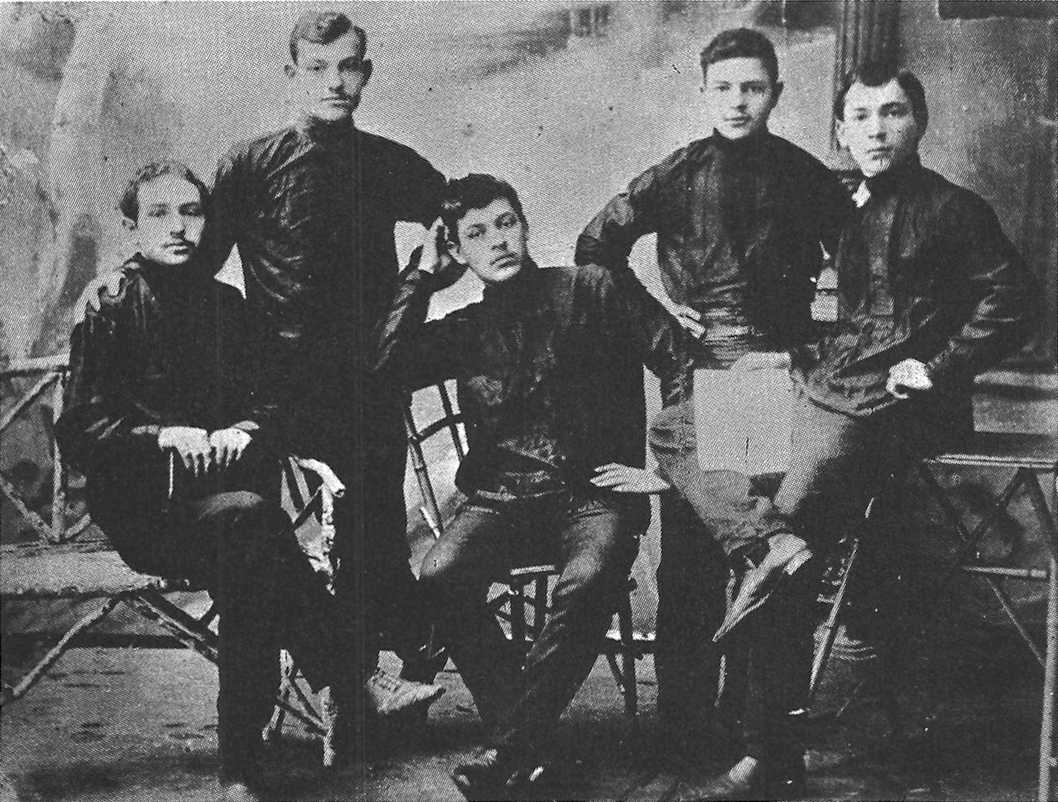
Members of the Black Banner.

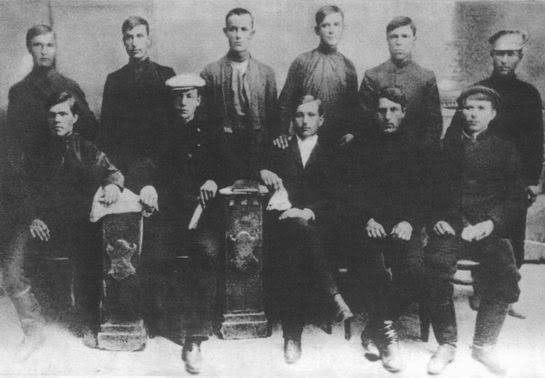
Members of the Union of Poor Peasants, including Nestor Makhno (bottom-left).

Juda Grossman described the rise of anarchist groups in the wake of the revolution as though they "sprang up like mushrooms after a rain". Jewish anarchist groups sprouted up throughout many of the small towns in the Pale, while in the cities of Ukraine, the anarchist movement that had first appeared in Odesa and Katerynoslav had spread to Kyiv and Kharkiv. In Huliaipole, the Union of Poor Peasants was formed to carry out expropriations against the rich, with a young Nestor Makhno joining the group and later being arrested and imprisoned for killing a police officer. The Black Banner, a terrorist organization inspired by the insurrectionary anarchism of Mikhail Bakunin, grew to include a large membership of Russians, Ukrainians and Jews. In Katerynoslav, Odesa and Sevastopol, the Black banner organized a number of detachments that carried out bombings on buildings, murdered and robbed rich people, and fought with the police in the streets. Even the merchant vessels that docked in Odesa's port became the target of expropriations. At his trial, a member of the Odesa branch of the Black Banner explained their method of "motiveless terror":

We recognize isolated expropriations only to acquire money for our revolutionary deeds. If we get the money, we do not kill the person we are expropriating. But this does not mean that he, the property owner, has bought us off. No! We will find him in the various cafes, restaurants, theaters, balls, concerts, and the like. Death to the bourgeois! Always, wherever he may be, he will be overtaken by an anarchist's bomb or bullet.

Although the terrorists within the Black Banner had been energised by their attacks in Odesa, a dissenting Communard group had also emerged that called for the organization of a mass uprising, rather than individual acts of propaganda of the deed. Anarchists in major cities began to shift their activities towards the distribution of propaganda, with the Kyiv Group of Anarchist-Communists pursuing a more moderate course, inspired by the works of Peter Kropotkin. Inspired by their Narodnik predecessors, anarcho-communists from Odesa, Katerynoslav, Kyiv and Chernihiv "went to the people", distributing radical propaganda among the peasantry. Their leaflet How the Peasants Succeed Without Authority depicted a communal village that lived without government and distributed its resources "from each according to their ability, to each according to their needs". Members of Bread and Freedom denounced the "robber bands" of Odesa, comparing them to the Italian mafia and claiming that their terror campaign demoralized and discredited the movement. Nevertheless, the anarcho-communists continued to advocate for propaganda of the deed, even approving "defensive terror" against the police and Black Hundreds, with a report from Odesa printed in Bread and Freedom declaring that "only the enemies of the people can be enemies of terror!"

Alongside anarcho-communism, Ukrainian cities also saw the emergence of other anarchist tendencies, such as anarcho-syndicalism in Odesa and individualist anarchism in Kyiv. The anarcho-syndicalists of Odesa declared themselves in opposition to the terrorist tactics of the time, having experienced a number of them first-hand, instead advocating for the construction of labor unions capable of radical industrial action. However, the Odesa Anarcho-Syndicalists soon found themselves establishing their own "battle detachments" to carry out expropriations, using the stolen money to buy more weapons and fund the printing and distribution of their literature, even going on to establish a bomb laboratory. The anarcho-syndicalist leader Daniil Novomirskii justified this use of terrorism as having acted to benefit the movement "as a whole", which he distinguished from the unplanned "motiveless terror" of the Nechayevshchina. The Odesa Anarcho-Syndicalists had adopted the French General Confederation of Labour (CGT) as a model for anarcho-syndicalism in Ukraine, centring trade unions as the means for class struggle, winning short-term gains while building towards a social revolution, in which the unions could themselves seize the means of production. Like their western counterparts, the Odesa syndicalists rejected vanguardism and tasked themselves with combatting socialist entryism in the unions, going on to form the Revolutionary All-Russian Union of Labor as their own version of the industrial union. The Union quickly spread throughout Ukraine, at one point claiming 5,000 members, creating a union presence particularly among the factory and dock workers of Odesa and the bakers and tailors of Katerynoslav. On the rise of the Ukrainian anarcho-syndicalist movement, Juda Grossman remarked: "I am convinced that God, if he existed, must be a syndicalist—otherwise Novomirskii would not have enjoyed such great success."

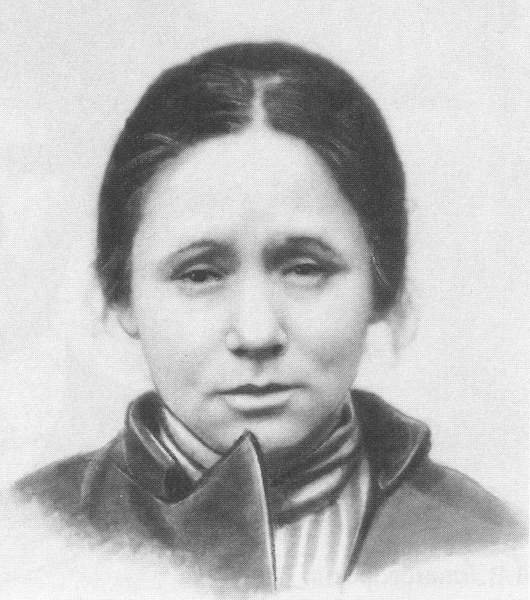
Olha Taratuta, member of the Black Banner and organizer for the Anarchist Red Cross.

The anti-intellectualism of the Polish revolutionary Jan Wacław Machajski, inspired by Bakunin's insurrectionary anarchism, also made an impression among Ukrainian anarchists, with the Black Banner members Olha Taratuta and Vladimir Striga organizing alongside Makhaevists in a secret society known as the Intransigents. Even the Odesa Anarcho-Syndicalists were influenced by Machajski's anti-intellectualism, with their denunciations of social democracy being rooted in their opposition to the creation of a new intellectual elite, declaring that "the liberation of the workers must be the task of the working class itself".

Despite the best efforts of the syndicalists, their extremist counterparts attracted far more attention from the press and the government. Pyotr Stolypin instituted pacification measures against the terrorist movement, placing the Russian Empire under a state of emergency and unleashing a wave of punishment against the Black Banner and other radical organisations, with a number of militants committing suicide after their capture. The concept of martyrdom entered the anarchist zeitgeist as hundreds of young anarchists were executed in the repression, including the Ukrainian individualist Matrena Prisiazhniuk, who was sentenced to death for raiding a sugar factory, murdering a priest and attempting to murder a police officer. Following her sentence, she remarked:

I am an Anarchist-Individualist [...] My ideal is the free development of the individual personality in the broadest sense of the word, and the overthrow of slavery in all its forms. [...] Proudly and bravely we shall mount the scaffold, casting a look of defiance at you. Our death, like a hot flame, will ignite many hearts. We are dying as victors. Forward, then! Our death is our triumph!

Contempt of court was common among anarchist defendants, with one terrorist from Odesa, Lev Aleshker, attacking the judges: "You yourselves should be sitting on the bench of the accused! [...] Down with all of you! Villainous hangmen! Long live anarchy!" In Aleshker's last testament, he predicted the coming of an anarchist future:

Slavery, poverty, weakness, and ignorance—the eternal fetters of man—will be broken. Man will be at the center of nature. The earth and its products will serve everyone dutifully. Weapons will cease to be a measure of strength and gold a measure of wealth; the strong will be those who are bold and daring in the conquest of nature, and riches will be the things that are useful. Such a world is called "Anarchy." It will have no castles, no place for masters and slaves. Life will be open to all. Everyone will take what he needs—this is the anarchist ideal. And when it comes about, men will live wisely and well. The masses must take part in the construction of this paradise on earth.

Five young anarchists were brought to trial for the bombing of the Cafe Libman in Odesa, all of them being sentenced to the death penalty. One of the defendants, Moisei Mets, denied any criminal guilt while also confessing to the bombing, declaring to the court that they demanded nothing less than "the final annihilation of eternal slavery and exploitation". Before his execution, Mets declared: "Death and destruction to the whole bourgeois order! Hail the revolutionary class struggle of the oppressed! Long live anarchism and communism!"

In Odesa alone, 167 anarchists were tried in the wake of the revolution, including 12 anarcho-syndicalists, 94 members of the Black Banner, 51 sympathisers, 5 members of the SR Combat Organization and 5 members of the Anarchist Red Cross. They were mostly young people of mixed Russian, Ukrainian and Jewish backgrounds, of whom 28 received the death penalty and 5 escaped prison. One of those that escaped was Olha Taratuta, who fled to Geneva and joined the buntars before returning to Katerynoslav and joining an anarcho-communist "battle detachment", which saw her arrested again and this time sentenced to hard labor. Vladimir Ushakov had also fled capture in Saint Petersburg, hiding out in Lviv before joining the Katerynoslav battle detachment and going on to expropriate a bank in Yalta. He was caught in the act and taken to prison in Sevastopol, where he committed suicide during a failed escape attempt. The leaders of the anarcho-syndicalist movement in Odesa and the anarcho-communist movement in Kyiv were all sentenced to long terms of hard labor.

The mass imprisonment of anarchist agitators affected each of them differently, with some taking the time to educate themselves and write of their experiences. In the Butyrka prison, Nestor Makhno met Peter Arshinov, who educated the young peasant on the anarcho-communist theories of Bakunin and Kropotkin, up until their release following the February Revolution. Makhno subsequently returned to Ukraine, where he began organizing an agricultural workers' union and was later elected chairman of the Huliaipole Soviet, from which he ordered the armed expropriation of land by the peasantry.

During World War I, the URP took part in the establishment of the Ukrainian Sich Riflemen and, following the war, collaborated in the constitution of the West Ukrainian People's Republic, with a number of its members subsequently joining the Central Council of the Ukrainian People's Republic. The federalist orientation of the Central Council was inspired in part by Drahomanov platform, and Drahomanov's influence further inspired the Socialist-Federalists and the Socialist-Revolutionaries.

=== Makhnovist Revolution ===
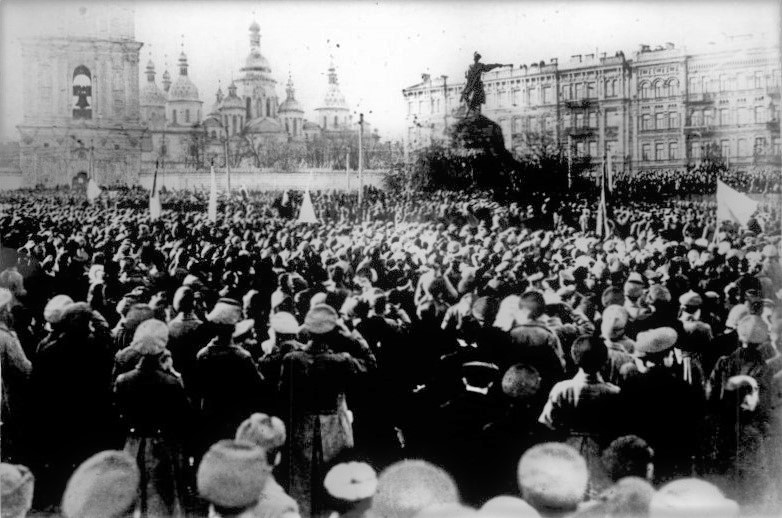
Demonstrations in Kyiv during the 1917 Revolution.

The outbreak of the February Revolution brought with it a resurgence in anarchist activity in Ukraine. Within the month, anarcho-syndicalist circles had been organized in the factories of Ukraine's largest industrial cities and miners in Donbas had adopted the preamble to the Industrial Workers of the World's constitution. In May 1917, the adoption of workers' control as Bolshevik policy was welcomed by many Ukrainian anarcho-syndicalists, with one proclaiming that "since the time of the revolution, the [Bolsheviks] have decisively broken with Social Democracy, and have been endeavoring to apply Anarcho-syndicalist methods of struggle." By this time, anarcho-syndicalists in Donbas had begun to reject traditional trade unions in favor of the newly established factory committees, which they considered to be more in line with revolutionary syndicalism.

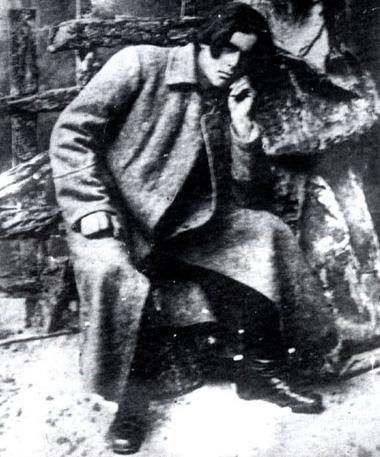
Nestor Makhno following the outbreak of the 1917 Revolution.

In July, attempts were made to unify the revolutionary anarchist movement, with an anarchist conference in Kharkiv discussing the revolutionary role of factory committees versus trade unions and how they could convert the world war into a world revolution. They also established an "Anarchist Information Bureau" to organize a national conference and gauge the movement's strength throughout the country. It was around this time that the Ukrainian revolutionary anarchist Nestor Makhno returned to his native Huliaipole, where he became involved as a union organizer among the local peasants. By August 1917, Makhno had been elected as the Chairman of the local Soviet, a position from which he organized an armed peasant band to expropriate the large privately held estates and redistribute those lands equally to the whole peasantry.

As the year went on, more anarchist political prisoners were released from prison and returned from exile, which brought a number of intellectuals into the movement. By the turn of 1918, further anarchist conferences had been held in Donbas, Kharkiv and Katerynoslav, resulting in the foundation of the newspaper Golos Anarkhista and the election of a Donbas Anarchist Bureau. The Bureau then organized a series of political lectures in Ukraine, inviting anarchist intellectuals such as Juda Grossman, Nikolai Rogdaev and Peter Arshinov. It was at this time that Volin returned to Ukraine and began work for the People's Commissariat for Education in Kharkiv, even getting so far as to turn down an appointment that would have made him the Ukrainian Commissar for Education.

But following the October Revolution, the anarchist movement came into conflict with the Bolsheviks. The Kharkiv Anarchist-Communist Association described the new soviet state as a "commissarocracy, the ulcer of our time", due to the centralization of power under the Council of People's Commissars, the direction of economics by the Supreme Soviet of the National Economy and the repression of dissident elements by the All-Russian Extraordinary Commission. In Katerynoslav, anarcho-communists called on the masses to overthrow the Bolshevik dictatorship and establish a libertarian socialist society in its place. Left-wing opposition to the Bolsheviks intensified after the ratification of the Treaty of Brest-Litovsk, which ceded the entirety of Ukraine to the Central Powers.

Ukrainian anarchists responded with the formation of armed detachments known as the Black Guards, which would undertake a campaign of guerilla warfare against the invading German Empire. Armed anarchist contingents quickly spread throughout Ukraine, with the Anarcho-Futurists of Kharkiv proclaiming "death to world civilization!" and anarchists in Katerynoslav breaking into the city's prisons and freeing the prisoners. Inspired by the earlier armed struggle during the 1905 Revolution, Ukrainian anarchists dedicated themselves to the destruction of "would-be counterrevolutionaries", which included the Whites, Bolsheviks, nationalists and German imperialists alike. Partisan detachments in Simferopol and Katerynoslav sang songs of the incoming "era of dynamite", which they believed would bring about libertarian communism. Ukrainian anarchist detachments subsequently carried out a wave of attacks and expropriations, eventually establishing ties with other underground anarchists in Moscow.

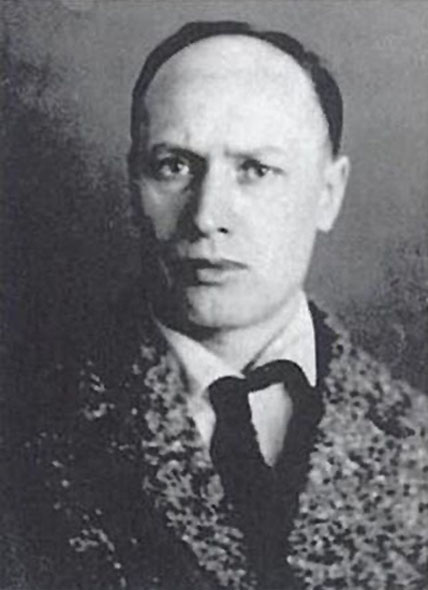
Peter Arshinov, one of the leaders of the Nabat and founder of platformism.

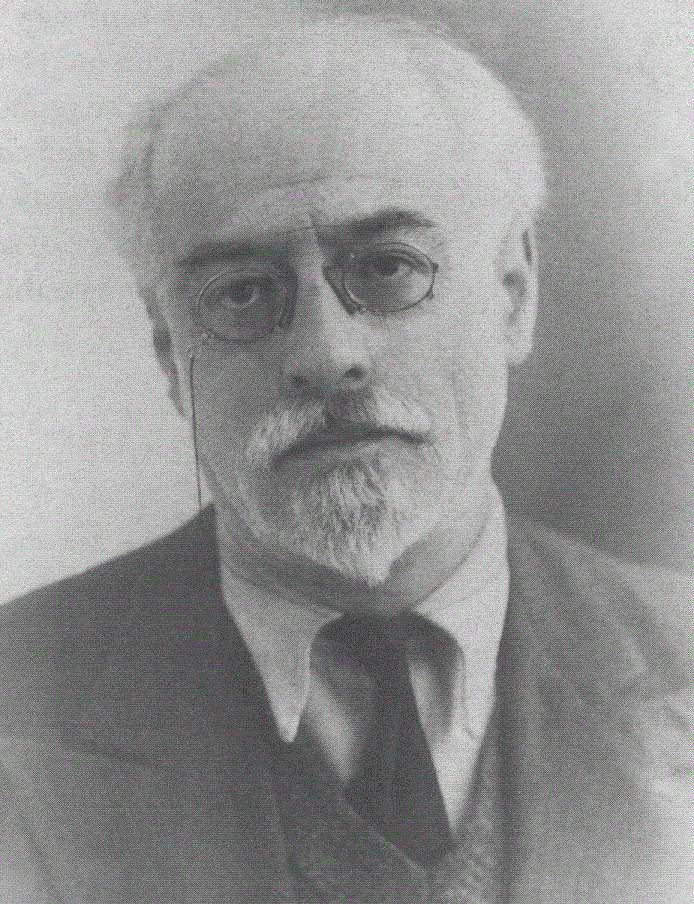
Volin, one of the leaders of the Nabat and founder of synthesis anarchism.

Fleeing from the repression in Petrograd and Moscow, Russian anarchists sought asylum in the "wild fields" of Ukraine, where the anarchist movement was still strong. By late 1918, the Nabat Confederation of Anarchist Organizations had been founded in Kharkiv and established branches in all of Ukraine's major cities. Among the Nabat's most prominent leaders were Volin, Aron Baron and Peter Arshinov, with its youth wing led by Senya Fleshin and Mark Mratchny. At its first conference in Kursk, the Nabat recognized the importance of building a nationwide anarchist federation at all levels of Ukrainian society, encouraging anarchists to participate in non-partisan soviets, factory committees and peasant councils, However, the Nabat's subsequent congress would end up discussing how the trade unions had absorbed the factory committees and how the Bolsheviks had taken over the soviets and transformed them into instruments of the state.

While the Nabat were critical of the Bolshevik dictatorship, it reserved most of its hostility for the White movement, which it considered to present the biggest threat to the Revolution. As the Nabat boycotted the Red Army, due to its authoritarian and militarist style of organization, it instead called for the formation of an independent and spontaneously organized "partisan army" to fight the Whites. A call that was taken up by the peasant leader Nestor Makhno. When the German Empire invaded Ukraine, Nestor Makhno's small peasant band hadn't been strong enough to fight it, with the detachment disbanding and Makhno himself fleeing to Moscow. Here he met with Peter Kropotkin and held an interview with Vladimir Lenin, during which he debated the differences between authoritarian and libertarian communism, eventually enlisting Bolshevik support for the anarchists that were holding back the counterrevolutionary advance in Ukraine. Alienated by the "paper revolution" of the Bolsheviks in Moscow, in July 1918 Makhno returned to Huliaipole, where he found the village occupied by both the Austro-Hungarian Army and the Ukrainian troops of Hetman Pavlo Skoropadskyi. He quickly rallied a partisan detachment under the black flag and launched raids against both the counterrevolutionary forces and the local nobility. Moving quickly across the steppe on horseback with weaponized tachanka, the Makhnovtsy quickly grew into a small army, as previously isolated guerrilla cells placed themselves under Makhno's command. Supported by the peasantry, they were able to carry out lightning warfare against their adversaries, using guerilla tactics to disperse and regroup their forces when needed.

Following the Armistice of 11 November 1918, the Central Powers withdrew from Ukraine, leaving behind a large amount of military equipment for the Makhnovists to seize. The Ukrainian State, unable to sustain itself without the support of either the central powers or the Ukrainian people, was overthrown by the Directorate, which established the Ukrainian People's Republic in its place. The Ukrainian Radical Party subsequently joined the Central Council, the democratic-federalist orientation of which was inspired in part by Drahomanov's platform, with Drahomanov's influence further inspiring the Socialist-Federalists and the Socialist-Revolutionaries. But the Ukrainian nationalists and their leader Symon Petliura quickly fell victim to anarchist attacks, with the Makhnovists ousting the forces of the People's Republic from Katerynoslav in a guerrilla attack. The city would later change hands between several different sides of the conflict.

Location of the Makhnovshchina in present-day Ukraine.

The region of Zaporizhzhia, with Huliaipole at its center, was transformed into a libertarian society, free of any political authority. By the turn of 1919, the Makhnovists were holding Regional Congresses of Peasants, Workers, and Insurgents, which discussed the economic, political and military issues affecting the Makhnovshchina. Focus was paid particularly to the issue of defense, calling for a "voluntary mobilization" of people into the Insurgent Army and electing a Regional Military-Revolutionary Council to oversee the election of non-partisan "free soviets" and the establishment of anarchist communes. Each commune had a little over 100 members and were organized along egalitarian lines with mutual aid as an organizing principle. The distribution of resources to the communes was overseen by the regional congresses, which organized the allotment of livestock, farming tools and land to each commune based on their individual abilities and needs. Makhno had himself assumed authority over the Insurgent Army, introducing the military discipline of the Zaporizhian Cossacks and appointing his own key officers, although the majority of the army's officers were elected by their own insurgent detachments. The Nabat, for its part, established a Cultural-Educational Commission for the purpose of providing free democratic education to Ukrainians, inspired by the Ferrer movement. Ukrainian Jews held a number of important positions in the Makhnovschina, with the majority fighting in the Insurgent Army, often in specifically Jewish detachments. Antisemitism was punished severely by the Makhnovists, with one insurgent commander being shot for raiding a Jewish town and another executed for displaying an antisemitic poster.

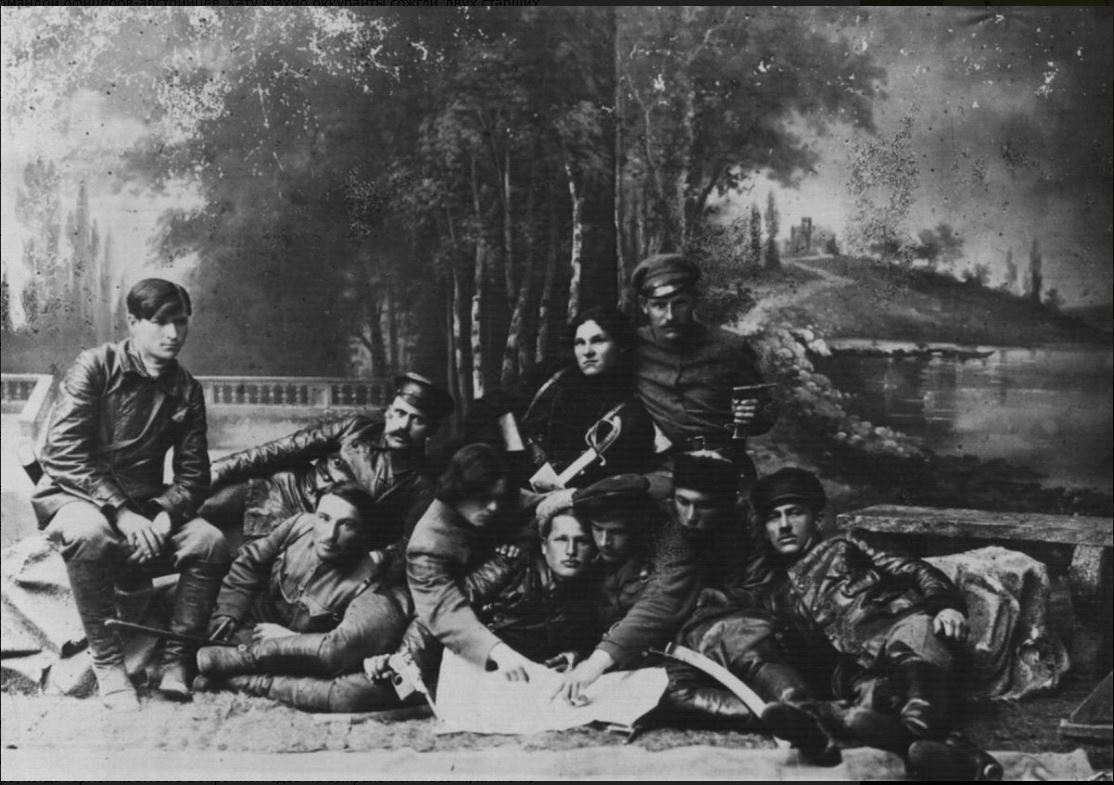
Lieutenants of the Revolutionary Insurgent Army of Ukraine.

The Makhnovists remained on good terms with the Bolsheviks at this time. When famine threatened Petrograd and Moscow, Huliaipole's Ukrainian peasants exported large amounts of grain to the Russian cities, while Makhno himself was cast as a "courageous partisan" by the Soviet press. By March 1919, the Insurgent Army had even been absorbed into the Red Army, becoming the 7th Ukrainian Soviet Division, subject to the orders of the Revolutionary Military Council. The Ukrainian Front of the Red Army, although commanded by Vladimir Antonov-Ovseenko, was largely made up of Ukrainian peasants led by the atamans Nestor Makhno and Nykyfor Hryhoriv. Considering themselves inheritors of the Zaporozhian Host, the peasantry were less committed to Bolshevism than they were to their liberation from "all those they considered their oppressors".

Hostilities within the Front grew over time, as the Bolshevik leadership developed a distaste for the peasant base and began to reign in the autonomy of the "free soviets". After Makhnovists accused the Bolsheviks of monopolizing the Revolution, Pavel Dybenko declared the Ukrainian anarchists to be "counterrevolutionary" and attempted to ban their congresses, which they held anyway. The Soviet press subsequently turned on the anarchists, decrying them as "kulaks" and "bandits". The Cheka also attempted to assassinate Nestor Makhno, but the two agents sent were caught and killed. When the anarchists held another congress, this time even inviting soldiers of the Red Army, the Military Commissar Leon Trotsky responded with another ban and declared Makhno to be an outlaw. Huliaipole's libertarian experiment was attacked first by Red Army, which forcibly dissolved the town's communes, and again by Anton Denikin's Armed Forces of South Russia, which liquidated its soviets. With peasants increasingly being brought into opposition against the Bolsheviks, by May 1919, both Makhno and Hryhoriv had deserted the Ukrainian Soviet Army.

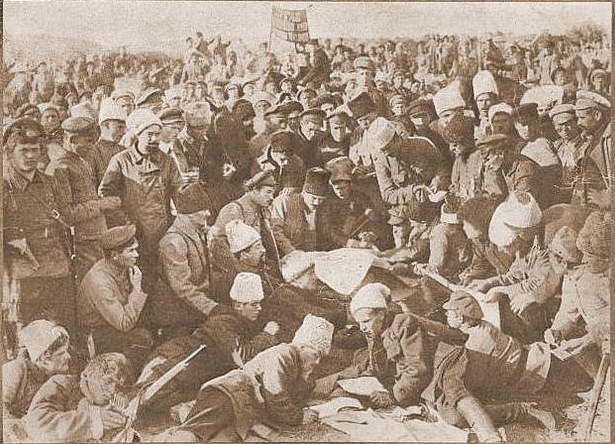
The Makhnovists planning an attack against the White army.

When Denikin's forces began an offensive against Moscow, the Makhnovists were initially forced into a retreat to Western Ukraine. But in September 1919, the Makhnovists returned and launched a surprise counterattack in Uman, cutting Denikin's army off from its supply lines, which forced him to call off the Moscow offensive and retreat to Crimea. The Makhnovists swiftly occupied the cities of Katerynoslav and Oleksandrivsk, releasing their prisoners, proclaiming freedom of speech and assembly, and dissolving the local revolutionary committeess. The Makhnovists emphasised self-organization and self-determination, agitating against political party activists that called for centralisation and advising unpaid workers to seize control of their workplaces and charge the customers directly. However, the agrarian Makhnovists found themselves unable to understand or adapt to the complexities of industrial capitalism, and would leave the cities shortly after to return to the battlefield.

Soviet military plans for the Siege of Perekop.

The Makhnovists resolved to defend their territory against both the Red and the White armies, with Trotsky again declaring Makhno an outlaw and the Makhnovists producing propaganda to persuade Red Army soldiers not to take up arms against them. The Makhnovists led the Red Army offensive into a protracted guerrilla war, causing great losses on both sides. The deaths were exacerbated by a typhus epidemic, which even struck Volin, resulting him in being captured by the Bolsheviks. But in October 1920, Pyotr Wrangel launched an offensive from Crimea, causing the Makhnovists to once again sign a truce with the Bolsheviks, on the conditions of their autonomy, the amnesty of all anarchist political prisoners and the right to freedom of speech. Upon recovery, Volin was released and returned to Kharkiv, where he resumed work for the Nabat and set about preparing for the slated All-Russian Anarchist Congress. Within the month, the Bolsheviks had reneged on the agreement. Following Wrangel's evacuation of the Crimea, the Makhnovist commanders were immediately shot by the Bolsheviks, Huliaipole was subsequently attacked by the Red Army and members of anarchist organizations throughout Ukraine were arrested by the Cheka. The remnants Insurgent Army retreated to Romania, with Makhno himself eventually making his way into exile in Paris. The power vacuum in Ukraine was definitively filled with the establishment of the Ukrainian Soviet Socialist Republic, with the Red Army taking control of the Dnieper River basin by the end of 1921. Any remaining remnants of anarchism in Ukraine were suppressed, with many anarchists being imprisoned in the Gulag, and the New Economic Policy was implemented, transforming the Ukrainian SSR into a state-capitalist economy.

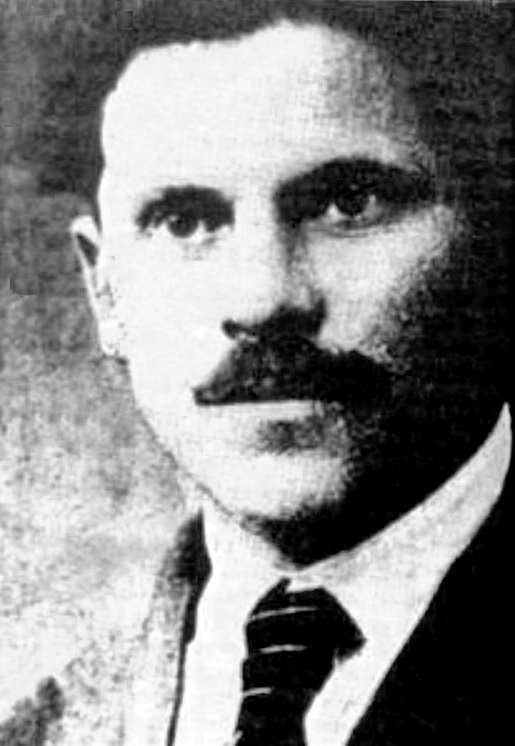
Sholem Schwarzbard, the assassin of Symon Petliura.

Following the dissolution of the Ukrainian People's Republic, many Ukrainian nationalist exiles experienced a sharp turn to right-wing politics, with a number even blaming Mykhailo Drahomanov's anarchist ideas for the Ukrainian defeat in the war of independence. (Note: The Ukrainian Radical Party (URP) itself maintained a commitment to both socialism and Ukrainian independence, in opposition to the right-wing nationalists and the Bolsheviks respectively. It became a member of the Labour and Socialist International and continued electoral activities in the new Republic of Poland, gaining 20,000 members by 1934.) During the war, antisemitic pogroms had caused the murder of tens of thousands of Jewish people, committed by all sides of the conflict. But it was Symon Petliura that was largely held responsible for the outbreak of violence, due to his position as chairman of the Ukrainian Directorate. While in exile in France, Petliura was assassinated by the Ukrainian Jewish anarchist Sholem Schwarzbard, who after a short trial was acquitted on all charges.

Meanwhile, the exiled anarcho-communists began to have their own disagreements in their analysis of the revolution. In order to rectify what he perceived to be a generalized state of disorganization within the anarchist movement, Peter Arshinov founded the organizational tendency of platformism, which found the approval of Nestor Makhno. Volin and Mollie Fleshin were among those that led the split of the synthesis faction over this proposal, considering the aims of "the Platform" to be the creation of an anarchist vanguard party and the establishment of a state. Arshinov retorted that his Platform did not conflict with anarchism, but in fact advocated for decentralization and anti-authoritarian practices. Makhno also accused Volin of being an agent provacateur for the Bolsheviks, which only drew the rest of the exiled anarchist movement into conflict against platformism, with Alexander Berkman himself denouncing Arshinov as a Bolshevik. This accusation became reality in 1930, when Arshinov returned to the Soviet Union and joined the Communist Party. Arshinov would later disappear during the Great Purge, while Makhno and Volin both succumbed to tuberculosis in their Parisian exile.

=== Resurgence ===
Following the end of the Povolzhye famine, there was widespread disillusionment with the New Economic Policy (NEP) due to rising levels of unemployment. Furthermore, the death of Lenin, the dissolution of the once-powerful Socialist-Revolutionary Party and the purging of leading academics and civil servants had opened a power vacuum in Ukrainian politics. During this time, there was a noted easing of repressive measures against the anarchist movement, leading to a resurgence of the Ukrainian anarchist movement, as a new generation of youths became attracted to the philosophy.

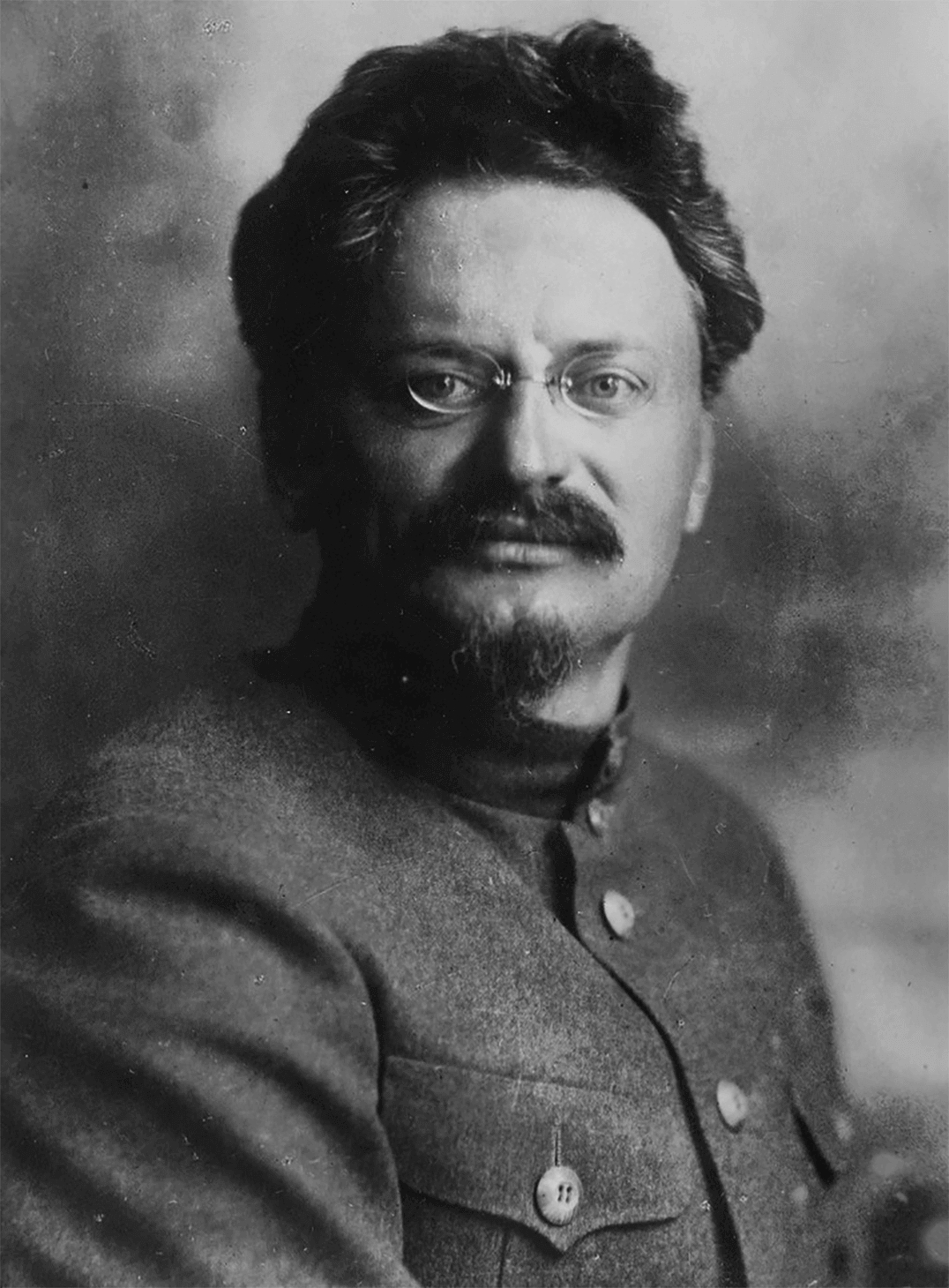
Leon Trotsky, the Ukrainian Bolshevik leader of the Left Opposition during the 1920s.

With the Bolsheviks' attention turned to its ongoing internal conflict between Stalinism and Trotskyism, anarchists declared their neutrality in the dispute, while expressing some sympathy for the Group of Democratic Centralism, which had numerous members in Ukraine. Anarchists began to openly criticise the Bolshevik government for its implementation of state capitalism, repression of libertarian socialists and destruction of soviet democracy. Letters from the USSR to exiled Ukrainian anarchists noted a revival in activity, with anarchism gaining sympathy particularly among the All-Union Leninist Young Communist League. Anarchists in Ukraine made contacts with organizations in Russia, with the intention of unifying the renewed movement and eventually holding an "All-Union Congress of Anarchists". The Cheka likewise reported a surge in anarchist activity, particularly among the well-organized anarcho-syndicalists, which had received support from the International Workers' Association (IWA).

There was also an upsurge in violent activity, with anarchists being reported to have gassed a theatre pit in Kharkiv, agitated against taxation in rural Ukrainian villages and attempted to carry out expropriations in Poltava. In Odesa, one armed detachment of about 30 members carried out attacks on infrastructure and local officials, committing a number of expropriations throughout 1923. The State Political Directorate's usual repression tactics proved ineffective against the anarchists, who engaged in both legal and clandestine activities, recruiting former Communists and organizing strike actions. State-run factories in cities throughout Ukraine were hit by strikes, even approaching the levels of a general strike in Donbas. Anarcho-syndicalists also organized the unemployed, leading a series of unemployment demonstrations in Odesa that culminated in the protestors storming the headquarters of the local government. The repression that followed led to the arrest of 75 anarchists, 16 of whom resisted arrest with arms, and the formal dissolution of the Odesan Anarchist Federation, which continued its organizing activities clandestinely. By the mid-1920s, Odesa had become a refuge for foreign anarchists fleeing oppression in Romania and Bulgaria. Italian and French anarchists even emigrated to Ukraine, where they established an agricultural commune near Yalta.

Esperanto clubs became a center of underground organizing for Ukrainian anarchists.

By 1924, there were anarchist groups in at least 28 Ukrainian cities. In the Odesa alone, there were three anarchist workers' circles, a youth group, a published journal and a library, with the police knowing of hundreds of anarchists in the city. Anarchists also organized within independent groups that were disconnected from the anarchist movement, such as Esperanto clubs and masonic bodies, which offered them a clandestine platform for their activities. In Kharkiv, anarchists re-established the Nabat Confederation of Anarchist Organizations, organized strike actions, published propaganda and developed contact with anarchists throughout Ukraine and Russia. In April 1924, they were subject to a wave of raids and arrests, but continued their underground organizing work, even planning an All-Union Anarchist Congress before another wave of arrests forced leading Kharkiv anarchists into exile. In Kyiv, anarcho-syndicallists made attempts to unify the Ukrainian anarchist movement, but the arrest waves continued, resulting in the suppression of anarchist youth groups and a dissident construction workers' union, as well as a number of clandestine groups in various other cities of Ukraine. Despite a subsequent arrest wave in 1925, the anarchist movement remained strong in Poltava, where young people continued to adopt anarchism even as more of them were being arrested, imprisoned and exiled.

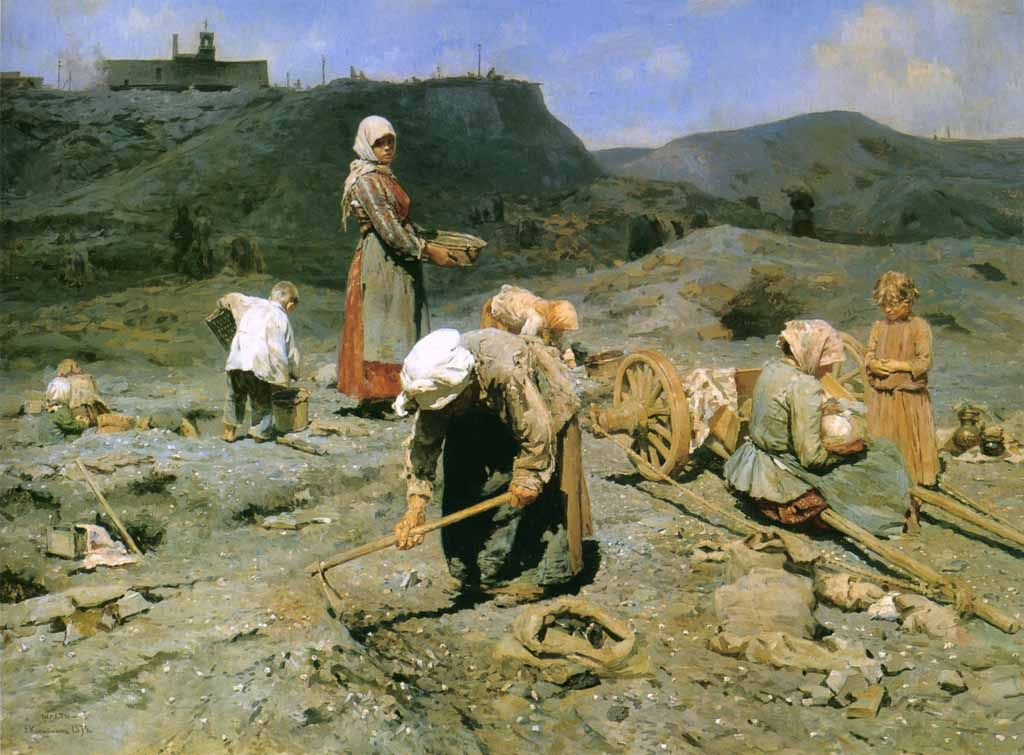
Poor people collecting coal in Donbas.

The growth of anarchist tendencies among Ukrainian students continued, with a number of youth groups sprouting up in cities throughout Ukraine, leading Communist Party officials to officially call for the repression of the youth anarchist movement. Soviet authorities were troubled by the growth of the anarchist underground and the leading role of anarcho-syndicalists in the workers' movement, as a number of "free trade unions" had organized strike actions, including among the miners in Bakhmut. The police further identified anarchist cells known as "fivers", which agitated within labor collectives, the student and unemployed workers' movements, and even in the Red Army itself. Soviet authorities noted that underground anarchist groups "were often composed of from 25 to 60 persons or more", with some even developing into mass movements among the Ukrainian working classes. Repressive actions against the movement in Kyiv failed to have lasting effects, as anarchist activity continued and even surged afterwards, the authorities noting anarchist attempts to unite into a single Ukrainian organization.

Repression largely resulted in the anarchist movement being pushed further away from legality and into clandestinity, as punitive measures were focused mostly on a few dozen prominent members of the anarchist old guard, with the secret police unable to infiltrate the clandestine "wildcat" groups. Imagined cells of underground anarchists engaged in acts of terrorism and expropriation presented the biggest threat to the Soviet government, which feared the onset of an anarchist-led mass uprising, despite Ukrainian anarchists of the time largely being either unable or unwilling to commit to terrorist tactics. Nevertheless, the inclination of some exiled anarchists in Poland towards carrying out a terror campaign in Russia provided the authorities with evidence of an alleged conspiracy in Ukraine, which allowed the police to intensify repression against the anarchist movement, going on to use the publishing house of Golos Truda as a way of baiting anarchists out of hiding. Following the rise of Joseph Stalin to power and the implementation of totalitarianism, punitive action against dissent was intensified, leading to the complete suppression of the Ukrainian anarchist movement by 1929.

=== Soviet rule ===
Flag of the Ukrainian Soviet Socialist Republic.

Political repression in Ukraine intensified under the totalitarian rule of Joseph Stalin. The policies of collectivization and dekulakization, as part of the first five-year plan, led to a famine in Ukraine known colloquially as the Holodomor - killing millions of people due to starvation. This was followed by a repressive campaign against the Ukrainian intelligentsia, culminating in the Great Purge of 1937–1938.

During World War II, the former Makhnovist Osip Tsebriy formed a green army to wage guerilla warfare against the Ukrainian SSR, the Reichskommissariat Ukraine and the ultra-nationalist Ukrainian Insurgent Army, briefly reinvigorating the anarchist movement among the Ukrainian peasantry in Kyiv. But it was defeated in 1943 by the Nazis and many of its members were forced into concentration camps. Nazi rule over Ukraine was eventually defeated by Soviet partisans, who restored Soviet rule and began a period of reconstruction in the country. Following the war, the URP formed part of the Ukrainian government in exile and joined with other left-wing groups to form the Ukrainian Socialist Party in 1950.

After the death of Stalin, the Khrushchev Thaw brought with it a period of De-Stalinization, which allowed the open criticism of Stalin's policies. Many Ukrainian communists particularly criticized the Stalinist policy of Russification, giving way instead to a period of Ukrainization. During the Stalinist period, Mykhailo Drahomanov had been denounced as a "petite bourgeois liberal" and a "Ukrainian nationalist", but following the Thaw, Ukrainian intellectuals began to rediscover Drahomanov's work, making sure to downplay the elements of his theory that didn't conform to Soviet political orthodoxy. However, this progress was reversed under the Brezhnev administration, which advocated for a return to Soviet nationalism - continuing the halted Russification of Ukraine. Drahomanov studies also underwent censorship during the Era of Stagnation but resurfaced once again during the 1980s, when students began to develop his theory into an alternative form of socialism to the prevailing Marxism-Leninism, growing substantially in scale. The political shift in Ukraine, combined with the changes brought by glasnost and Perestroika, saw the country's first democratic elections, which culminated with the Declaration of Independence of Ukraine.

=== Independent Ukraine ===
The Ukrainian anarchist movement, which had reformed underground in the 1970s and grew substantially during the Revolutions of 1989, finally re-emerged publicly in the newly independent Ukraine. In 1994, the Revolutionary Confederation of Anarcho-Syndicalists (RKAS) was established in Ukraine, gaining 2,000 members by 2000. The RKAS coordinated trade unions, formed "Black Guard" defense units and established worker cooperatives around the country.

Logo of the Autonomous Workers' Union.

But the Ukrainian new left that had first constituted itself during the period of Perestroika, forming in opposition to the dominant Communist Party of Ukraine, largely failed to construct a sustainable nationwide political movement. The new left only began to grow during the late 2000s, when widespread disillusionment with the Orange Revolution brought a new generation of young activists into the movement. The left-libertarian student union Direct Action led a number of mobilizations during this period, but their activity started to dwindle by 2013. The anarcho-syndicalist Autonomous Workers' Union (AWU) also sought to establish an industrial union in Ukraine, but saw most of its successes in promoting cultural liberalism. It was this opposition to cultural conservatism in particular that brought the Ukrainian new left into conflict with both nationalist and neo-Soviet parties.

==== Revolution of Dignity ====
Upon the outbreak of the Maidan protests, the Ukrainian new left were supportive of the movement, emphasising the promotion of "European values" such as gender equality and minority rights. (Note: Timothy D. Snyder argued that the Revolution of Dignity initially had a left-wing and anti-authoritarian character, citing the grassroots self-organization of a gift economy in the Maidans, where crowdfunding was used to coordinate mutual aid.) The Ukrainian new left engaged in the self-organization of the Maidans, coordinating protests, self-defense, education and media engagement, describing the process as a form of "spontaneous anarchism". Direct Action was able to mobilize students in Kyiv to hold popular assemblies, but was not able to institutionalize their control over education policy or even break from the anti-corruption agenda of the neoliberals. Anarchists in Lviv and Kharkiv managed to get increased recognition for their participation in the movement, but were also unable to shift the agenda of the local protests towards left-wing politics.

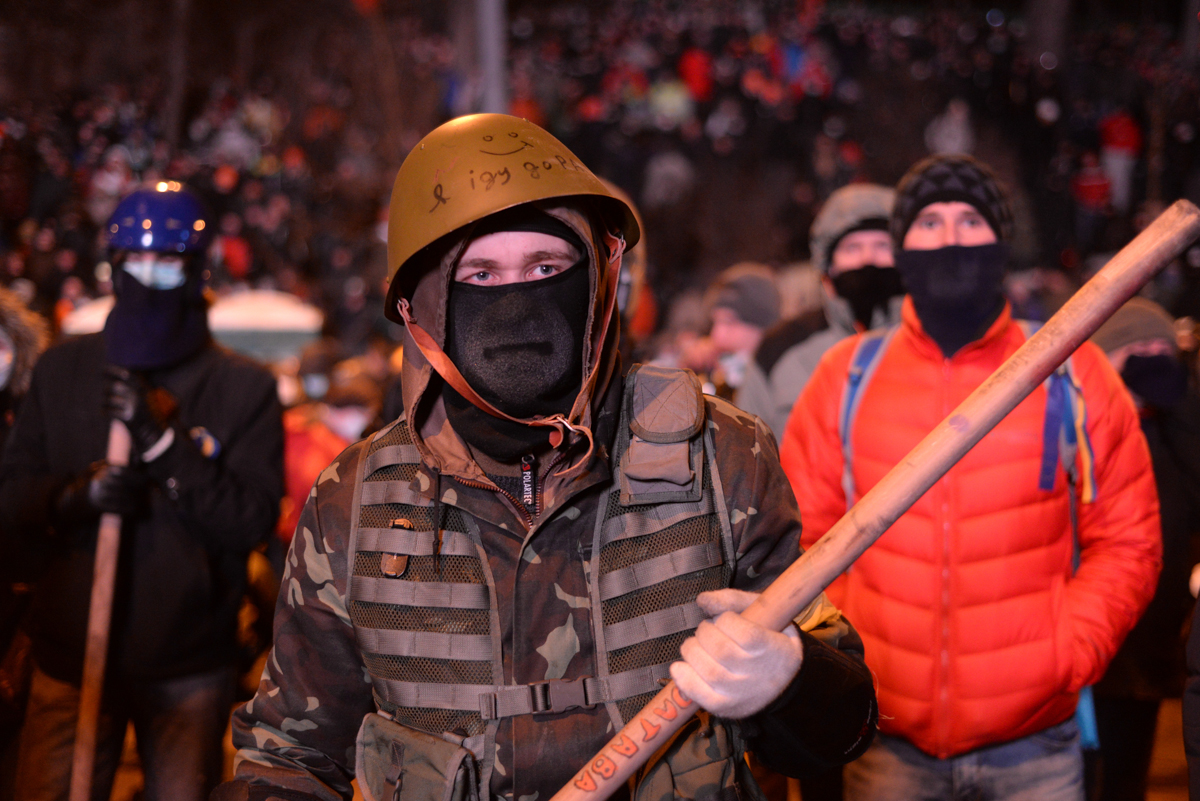
Armed protesters during the Euromaidan.

The disorganized and small groups of the new left quickly found themselves outpaced by far-right groups, which attacked new left activists for their promotion of egalitarian and feminist ideas, resulting in the marginalization of the organized left in the Maidan. Faced with the dilemma of continued participation in the Maidan movement in the face of an increasingly right-wing agenda, attempts to establish a left-wing "third camp" were stillborn, leaving the Ukrainian new left to slowly become the left wing of national liberalism in Ukraine. The new left's support for the anti-authoritarianism and spontaneous self-organization of the Maidan also brought it into conflict with the Anti-Maidan movement, which the new left opposed due to its Russian nationalism and cultural conservatism.

By the end of the Revolution of Dignity and the outbreak of the Russo-Ukrainian War, the Ukrainian new left had become completely marginalized by the polarization between competing Russian and Ukrainian nationalisms. In the wake of the conflict, anarchist analyses of the events were driven by the AWU and the Nihilist collective, which came to characterize the Maidan as a bourgeois revolution against the oligarchy and the political corruption of the Ukrainian government, while in-turn characterizing the subsequent Russian intervention as a counter-revolution. In order to advance the gains of the Maidan, Ukrainian anarchists concluded it necessary to ignite a social revolution, in order to dismantle the Ukrainian capitalist state and replace it with a decentralized system of self-governance and social ownership.

==== Russo-Ukrainian War ====
The escalation of the conflict and the Russian invasion of Ukraine led to the ongoing War in Donbas, in which the Ukrainian state (with far-right paramilitary support) fought against the forces of the Russian state and pro-Russian separatist forces. Many anarchists were caught in the middle of the conflict, even leading to the dissolution of the Donbas-based Revolutionary Confederation of Anarcho-Syndicalists, which was forced to continue its operations illegally and underground.

Following this period of renewed conflict, in 2015 a Ukrainian branch of Revolutionary Action was established, organizing around the principles of solidarity and direct action. The organization has held demonstrations outside the Belarusian embassy.

On 27 October 2019, insurrectionary anarchists carried out a bomb attack against a mobile communications tower, in the Proletarskyi District in Donetsk. It was reportedly done to draw attention to the torture being performed by the state security forces of the Donetsk People's Republic.

In the wake of the 2022 Russian invasion of Ukraine, Ukrainian anarchists were among those that joined the Territorial Defense Forces, with a group calling itself the Resistance Committee establishing an anti-authoritarian "international detachment" in Kyiv. A separate anarchist detachment called Black Flag was also set up in response to the Russian invasion. Since the start of the conflict, about 100 Ukrainian anarchists and 20 foreign anarchists have reportedly signed up to fight in the Armed Forces of Ukraine, with one claiming they were "fighting to protect the more or less free society that exists in Ukraine".

== See also ==
- Category:Ukrainian anarchists
- List of anarchist movements by region
- Anarchism in Belarus
- Anarchism in Poland
- Anarchism in Romania
- Anarchism in Russia

== Bibliography ==
- Avrich, Paul (1971) [1967]. The Russian Anarchists. Princeton: Princeton University Press. ISBN 0-691-00766-7. OCLC 1154930946.
- Ishchenko, Volodymyr (2020). "Left divergence, right convergence: anarchists, Marxists, and nationalist polarization in the Ukrainian conflict, 2013–2014". Globalizations. 17 (5). Taylor & Francis: 820–839. Bibcode:2020Glob...17..820I. doi:10.1080/14747731.2020.1722495. ISSN 1474-7731. LCCN 2004262351. OCLC 8611265618. S2CID 212781355.
- Magocsi, Paul R. (1996). A History of Ukraine. Toronto: University of Toronto Press. ISBN 0-8020-0830-5. OCLC 757049758.
- Savchenko, Viktor (19 September 2017). Svitlana Krys (ed.). "The Anarchist Movement in Ukraine at the Height of the New Economic Policy (1924-25)". East/West: Journal of Ukrainian Studies. 4 (2). Odesa State University of Internal Affairs: 173–186. doi:10.21226/T2CK78. ISSN 2292-7956. OCLC 7180822604. Archived from the original on 27 January 2021.
- Skirda, Alexandre (2004) [1982]. Nestor Makhno: Anarchy's Cossack. Translated by Sharkey, Paul. Edinburgh: AK Press. ISBN 1-902593-68-5. OCLC 58872511. Archived from the original on 28 February 2022.
- Yarmolinsky, Avrahm (2014) [1957]. Road to Revolution: A Century of Russian Radicalism. Princeton, New Jersey: Princeton University Press. ISBN 978-0691610412. OCLC 890439998.
