= Iuda Grossman =

Ukrainian revolutionary anarchist, publicist, and literary critic

- יודאַ גראָסמאַן
- Born: Iuda Solomonovich Grossman; 7 February 1883; Novoukrainka, Yelisavethrad, Kherson, Russian Empire (modern-day Ukraine)
- Died: 6 June 1934 (aged 51); Moscow, Russia, Soviet Union
- Other name: Iuda Roshchin
- Organisations: South Russian Workers' Union (1897–1902); Bread and Freedom (1903–1905); Black Banner (1905–1908); Moscow Federation of Anarchist Groups (1917–1920); Russian Association of Proletarian Writers (1925–1932)
- Movement: Anarchist communism
- Relatives: Abram Grossman (brother)

Iuda Solomonovich Grossman (7 February 1883 – 6 June 1934), also known by his pen name Iuda Roshchin, was a Ukrainian anarchist-communist and art critic. During the 1905 Revolution, he led the Black Banner organisation in Białystok and became a vocal critic of anarcho-syndicalism after the death of his brother Abram Grossman. After the revolution was suppressed, he fled into exile, where he joined the internationalist opposition to World War I. He returned from exile during the 1917 Revolution and became a supporter of the Bolsheviks, for which he was labelled a "Soviet anarchist". He later became a literary critic for the Russian Association of Proletarian Writers.

== Biography ==
=== Early life ===
Iuda Solomonovich Grossman was born into a Ukrainian Jewish merchant family in Kherson, in 1883. As a member of an ethnic minority group, Grossman was attracted towards anarchism. In 1897, he joined the South Russian Workers' Union in Yelysavethrad, for which he was placed under police surveillance. In 1902, he fled into exile in Geneva, where he joined the anarchist communist group Bread and Freedom and became a supporter of anarchist terrorism. He returned to the Russian Empire after the outbreak of the 1905 Revolution.

=== 1905 Revolution ===
Grossman was one of the leaders of the 1905 Revolution in the Polish city of Białystok, where he recalled that anarchist groups had "sprang up like mushrooms after a rain" in the wake of Bloody Sunday. He took the leadership of the local branch of the Black Banner, an anarchist communist organisation which advocated for a campaign of terrorism against the city's business owners. The city's previously small anarchist movement grew rapidly, with new recruits joining from the local branches of the Socialist Revolutionary Party (PSR) and the Bundist movement. At its peak, Grossman estimated that the city's anarchist movement counted 300 active members, with hundreds more sympathisers and supporters. Most of the city's anarchists joined the Black Banner, which printed anti-capitalist literature calling for a social revolution against the state and private property, and distributed it to factory workers. Grossman himself called for the elimination of the anarchist movement's "humanist tendencies", including the idealism and liberalism he perceived in the works of Peter Kropotkin, and instead advocated for an anarchist theory grounded in class struggle. During this period, Grossman observed a sense of what he called "mechanical militancy", in which terrorists would target anyone from business owners to postmen wearing state uniforms.

Meanwhile, the Ukrainian trade unionist Daniil Novomirskii attracted numerous members into his South Russian Group of Anarcho-Syndicalists, leading Roshchin to remark that "God, if he existed, must be a syndicalist". Grossman's brother, Abram Grossman, became a leading opponent of syndicalism and instead practiced a revolutionary form of anarchist communism. In February 1908, Abram Grossman was shot by Gendarmes at the Kyiv railway station. Iuda Grossman subsequently succeeded his brother as a leading voice of anti-syndicalism, penning denunciations in the journal Buntar under the pseudonym of "Roshchin". He accused exiled criticised the syndicalists for focusing their demands on higher wages and shorter working days, which he claimed would only benefit highly-organised skilled workers, while neglecting the unskilled workers and the unemployed.

After the suppression of the revolution, Grossman fled into exile in Western Europe, where he moderated his stance and moved towards what he called "critical syndicalism". He now accepted the role of trade unions in revolutionary struggle, so long as they were not controlled by socialist political parties, and advocated for anarchists to join trade unions so they convert other workers to anarchism. By early 1908, Grossman had moved to Paris, where he met fellow Ukrainian anarchist Ivan Knizhnik. The two received a letter from the anarchist militant Dmitrii Bogrov, who had been accused by the PSR of being an agent provocateur and asked them to help clear his name; Grossman and Knizhnik both believed Bogrov to be innocent of the charges against him. The accusations continued to follow Bogrov, who wrote to Grossman in 1911 that he had been forced to leave the PSR. To clear himself of the accusations, the PSR ultimately set him the tas of assassinating a government official; Bogrov chose to assassinate the prime minister Pyotr Stolypin in September 1911.

=== 1917 Revolution ===
At the outbreak of World War I, Grossman was in Geneva, where he formed part of a group of internationalists, along with the Russian anarchist Aleksandr Ge and the Georgian anarchist Georgy Gogelia. In the spring of 1915, Grossman signed the International Anarchist Manifesto on the War, which called for workers in belligerent countries to transform the inter-imperialist war into a civil war against their own governments. He and his group sharply criticised Peter Kropotkin and other signatories of the Manifesto of the Sixteen, who had declared their support for the Allies, denouncing them as "anarcho-patriots". Grossman instead called for a social revolution to overthrow the Russian Empire and the capitalist system. To publicise their views, Grossman and Gogelia published Put' k Svobode, an antimilitarist journal.

When the Empire was finally overthrown in the February Revolution of 1917, Grossman celebrated the turn of events, declaring that "the sun has arisen and has dispersed the black clouds". When the provisional government proclaimed a general amnesty for political prisoners and exiles, Grossman soon returned from exile. Following his return to Ukraine, he gave a series of lectures in Donbas, alongside Peter Arshinov and Nikolai Rogdaev. He then moved to Moscow, where he joined the Moscow Federation of Anarchist Groups; there he met the Ukrainian revolutionary Nestor Makhno, who later described Grossman and other members of the Federation as "men of books rather than deeds".

After the Bolsheviks seized power in the October Revolution, Grossman declared his support for Bolshevism. He formulated an anarchist theory on the "dictatorship of the proletariat" and called for anarchists to cooperate with the Bolshevik government. This attracted criticism from the wider anarchist movement, with many anarchists denouncing him first as an "anarcho-Bolshevik" and later as a "Soviet anarchist". In early 1919, Grossman briefly moved to Huliaipole to participate in the Makhnovist movement. Makhno and Volin suspected Grossman of being a spy for the Cheka, but took no action against him. At a meeting of anarchists in Moscow in 1920, he proclaimed it to be "the duty of every anarchist" to collaborate with the Russian Communist Party, which he characterised as the revolutionary vanguard, and called on them to leave their political theories aside so they could focus on practical work to support the revolution. His speech was poorly received by most of the attendees, with the exception of Alexander Berkman, who sympathised with Grossman's Soviet anarchism. Despite his loyalty to the new government, Grossman was briefly arrested by the Bolshevik authorities during a crackdown against the Russian anarchist movement.

=== Art criticism ===
During the years of the New Economic Policy, Grossman withdrew from the anarchist movement and joined the Russian Association of Proletarian Writers (RAPP) as an art critic. He penned a series of literary criticisms for the RAPP's journal Na Postu. On the occasion of the centenary of Mikhail Bakunin's birth in 1926, Grossman was recruited to give lectures about Bakunin at the Communist Academy. In a 1926 article for Contemporary Architecture, which he titled "Notes of an Ignoramus", he wrote that modern architecture struggled to reconcile the material requirements of buildings with their moral requirements, and divided architecture respectively into utilitarian and aesthetic expressions. In 1929, he published the work The Art of Changing the World.

In April 1930, he participated in a meeting of RAPP critics at the Communist Academy, where they denounced Aleksandr Voronsky and members of the Pereval group for Trotskyism and various other anti-Stalinist tropes. Grossman was critical of Nikolay Akimov's 1932 adaptation of Hamlet, highlighting what he saw as a gap between Akimov's intentions and the result. In June 1933, he attended a meeting chaired by Lev Kamenev at the Academic Publishing House, which sought to publish a collected works of William Shakespeare.

Grossman died of natural causes shortly before the beginning of the Great Purge, in 1934.

== Works ==
- Grossman-Roshchin, Iuda Solomonovich (1924). "Critique of Kropotkin's Fundamental Teachings". Krasnaya Nov. 2. Moscow: 139–154.
- Grossman-Roshchin, Iuda Solomonovich (1924). "From the history of the anarchist "Black Banner" movement in Białystok". Biloye (27/28): 172–182.
- Grossman-Roshchin, Iuda Solomonovich (1926). "Notes of a Layman". Modern Architecture (3): 77. Archived from the original on 12 May 2021.

== Bibliography ==
- Aizman, Anna (2023). "In the Jewish Tower: Prison Stories by a Forgotten Anarchist". In Torres, Anna Elena; Zimmer, Kenyon (eds.). With Freedom in Our Ears: Histories of Jewish Anarchism. University of Illinois Press. pp. 194–216. ISBN 978-0-252-05428-0. JSTOR 10.5406/jj.982975.14.
- Assay, Michelle (2015). "Akimov and Shostakovich's Hamlet: a Soviet 'Shakesperiment'". Actes des congrès de la Société française Shakespeare. 33 (33). doi:10.4000/shakespeare.3329.
- Avrich, Paul (1971) [1967]. The Russian Anarchists. Princeton: Princeton University Press. ISBN 0-691-00766-7. OCLC 1154930946.
- Carpov, Victor; Lodder, Christina (2016). "Typology and Ideology: Moisei Ginzburg Revisited". Art in Translation. 8 (2): 169–193. doi:10.1080/17561310.2016.1216048.
- D'Agostino, Anthony (2019). "Anarchism and Marxism in the Russian Revolution". In Levy, Carl; Adams, Matthew S. (eds.). The Palgrave Handbook of Anarchism. Palgrave Macmillan. pp. 409–428. doi:10.1007/978-3-319-75620-2_24. ISBN 978-3-319-75619-6.
- Darch, Colin (2020). Nestor Makhno and Rural Anarchism in Ukraine, 1917-1921. London: Pluto Press. ISBN 9781786805263. OCLC 1225942343.
- Dobrenko, Evgeny (2011). "Literary criticisms and the transformations of the literary field during the Cultural Revolution, 1928-1932". In Dobrenko, Evgeny; Tihanov, Galin (eds.). A History of Russian Literary Theory and Criticism: The Soviet Age and Beyond. Russian and East European Studies. Vol. 233. University of Pittsburgh Press. pp. 43–63. ISBN 9780822977445.
- Egorova, Liudmila (2015). "Gustav Shpet and the Shakespearean Circle". Russian Studies in Literature. 51 (4): 34–51. doi:10.1080/10611975.2015.1089134.
- Geifman, Anna (2005). "Psychohistorical approaches to 1905 radicalism". In Heywood, Anthony J.; Smele, Jonathan D. (eds.). The Russian Revolution of 1905. Routledge. pp. 13–33. ISBN 9780203002087.
- Goodwin, James Frank (2007). "Russian Anarchism and the Bolshevization of Bakunin in the Early Soviet Period". Kritika: Explorations in Russian and Eurasian History. 8 (3): 533–560. doi:10.1353/kri.2007.0035.
- Heehs, Peter (1994). "Foreign Influences on Bengali Revolutionary Terrorism 1902–1908". Modern Asian Studies. 28 (3): 533–556. doi:10.1017/S0026749X00011859.
- Perlina, Nina (2014). "Dostoevsky in Bakhtin's Collected Works". Russian Studies in Literature. 50 (4): 16–27. doi:10.2753/RSL1061-1975500403.
- Rublyov, Dmitry Ivanovich (2014). The Russian Anarchist Movement During the First World War. From the history of anarchism – the 200th anniversary of the birth of Mikhail Bakunin. Translated by Archibald, Malcolm. University of Szczecin – via Kate Sharpley Library.
- Swain, Geoffrey (2020). "The Bolshevik Anti-Anarchist Action of Spring 1918" (PDF). Revolutionary Russia. 33 (2): 221–245. doi:10.1080/09546545.2020.1830602.
- Tokmakoff, George (1965). "Stolypin's Assassin". Slavic Review. 24 (2): 314–321. doi:10.2307/2492333. ISSN 0037-6779. JSTOR 2492333.
