= Daniil Novomirskii =

Ukrainian Jewish anarcho-syndicalist (1882–1936)

- Даниил Новомирский
- Born: Yakov Isaevich Kirilovskii; 1882; Podolia, Russian Empire
- Died: c. 1936 (aged 53–54); Siberia, Soviet Union
- Political party: Russian Communist Party (1919–1921)
- Other political affiliations: South Russian Group of Anarcho-Syndicalists (1905–1907)
- Movement: Anarcho-syndicalism

Yakov Isaevich Kirilovskii (Russian: Яков Исаевич Кирилловский; 1882-c. 1936), commonly known by his pseudonym Daniil Novomirskii (Russian: Даниил Новомирский), was a Ukrainian Jewish anarcho-syndicalist. A leading figure in the Ukrainian syndicalist movement, Novomirskii sharply criticised the terrorist tactics of anarchist communism and the opportunism of social democracy. His South Russian Group of Anarcho-Syndicalists grew in popularity among workers throughout Ukraine, but it was suppressed in the aftermath of the 1905 Revolution and Novomirskii himself was imprisoned. After the 1917 Revolution, he became a notable anarchist supporter of the Russian Communist Party, although he was later disillusioned by its implementation of the New Economic Policy. He and his wife disappeared into the Gulag during the Great Purge.

== Biography ==
Yakov Isaevich Kirilovskii was born into a Ukrainian Jewish family of teachers on 5 March 1882 in Gaisin (northern Ukraine, Kamenets Podolski province. He went to school in Odesa and studied Law in Paris. He took on the pseudonym of Daniil Novomirskii (literally "Man of the New World"). By the turn of the 20th century, according to Paul Avrich, he had joined the nascent Ukrainian anarchist movement; he became a Social Democrat in 1900. He was arrested in February 1904, convicted but freed on bail in September 1904, and emigrated, becoming an anarchist while in exile.

=== Revolutionary activism ===
According to Inna Shtakser, following the outbreak of the 1905 Russian Revolution, he moved to Odesa and made contact the local anarcho-communist group. He thene shuttled back and forth between Odessa and abroad until 1907. He was quickly disillusioned by the group's advocacy of terrorism as a lifestyle, which he believed would alienate the working classes from their cause. Novomirskii later recalled that, during a lecture he gave on behalf of the group at Odesa University, students had been surprised to find out that anarchists had a coherent worldview, as they previously believed they were "simply another kind of pogromist". Although his anti-statist and anti-capitalist politics were well received by his audience, he was removed from the stage in favour of the group's leader Lazar Gershkovich, who he portrayed as a fanatic that kept chanting the words "Rob, cut, beat", to the amusement of the students.

He was involved in a number of bank robberies. In December 1905, Novomirskii witnessed the Chernoe Znamia's bombing of the Cafe Libman in Odesa, noting the negative reaction of workers in the crowd, some of whom speculated it to have been the work of agent provocateurs. Novomirskii warned that if anarchists continued to pursue such tactics, they would only alienate the masses, and their members would end up like the executed leaders of Narodnaya Volya. He instead called for anarchists to agitate in factories and organise trade unions, which themselves would be capable of carrying out "economic terror" against the bourgeoisie, in the form of strike actions, boycotts and expropriations.

Before long, Novomirskii had become the leading figure of syndicalism in the Russian Empire. He distinguished himself from the French syndicalists, believing that a new model for syndicalism was needed in order to fit the specific conditions in Eastern Europe. The group that gathered around him (including an emigre newspaper called Novy Mir, for which he regularly wrote) began to call themselves "anarcho-syndicalists", in order to both emphasise their anarchist character but also their difference from both the French "revolutionary syndicalists" and the anarchist communists. From Odesa, Novomirskii established the South Russian Group of Anarcho-Syndicalists. The group attracted into its ranks Ukrainian factory workers, sailors and dockworkers in Odesa, as well as bakers and tailors in Katerynoslav, and even formed links with anarchists in Moscow. Its "organisational commission" was set up as an executive body to coordinate local groups, while a "battle detachment" was established to obtain funds for the group. Novomirskii's efforts were so successful that he convinced Juda Grossman that "God, if he existed, must be a syndicalist".

But the gradualist methods of the anarcho-syndicalists were eventually overtaken by their terrorist counterparts, with robberies, bombings and assassinations becoming commonplace during the period. In the repression that followed in the wake of the revolution, a dozen anarcho-syndicalists were tried and imprisoned in Odesa. Novomirskii himself was among those that were arrested and imprisoned in forced labour camps. He was arrested in 1907, convicted and sentenced to an eight year prison term. He served two years in Odesa and the remainder in the Butyrki prison in Moscow up until 1915. He was then banished to a town in Irkutsk province in Siberia. From there, he escaped to the USA.

The line of Novomirskii's defunct South Russian Group of Anarcho-Syndicalists was taken up by the anarcho-syndicalist newspaper Golos Truda, edited by Grigorii Maksimov, Efim Yarchuk and Nikolai Dolenko.

=== After the Revolution ===
Avrich says that in the wake of the February Revolution of 1917, Novomirskii was released from the forced labour camp which he had been imprisoned in for over a decade. Along with Juda Grossman, Aleksandr Ge, Bill Shatov, and Anatoli Zhelezniakov, Novomirskii became a leading voice of the "Soviet anarchists" and declared his support for the Bolshevik government. After a series of Cheka raids against the anarchists in the summer of 1918, members of the Black Guards considered plans to seize control of Moscow, but were dissuaded by Novomirskii and Aleksei Borovoi. His "Open Letter to Anarchists" was published in Pravda in May 1920. Novomirskii joined the Communist Party was appointed as an official of the nascent Communist International.

By 1922, Novomirskii's criticisms of Bolshevism were scathing. He became disillusioned with the Communist Party because of the implementation of the New Economic Policy (NEP), which he viewed as turning back the gains of the revolution. He resigned from the party and dedicated himself to scholarship, as a contributor for the Great Soviet Encyclopedia. During the Great Purge, in 1936, Novomirskii and his wife were arrested and subsequently disappeared into the Gulag in Siberia, where they died on a date unknown.

== Political thought ==
=== Syndicalism ===
In the period 1904-1914, Novomirskii criticised the dominant anarchist-communist approach of Peter Kropotkin and his supporters the "Klebovoltsi" around the review Khleb i Volya (Bread and Freedom), seeing them as "utterly muddle-headed and replete with remnants of populist prejudices with its extreme subjectivity, sentimentality and erudite humanism."

Novomirskii proposed that class struggle and not mutual aid should be the central principle of anarchists: trade unions should carry out the dual role of struggling for improvements to working conditions while also preparing workers for a social revolution, in which the unions would act as the nucleus for a post-revolutionary society. He believed that a "revolutionary minority" of enlightened workers could act as leaders - but not commanders - of the revolutionary movement, tasking themselves with preventing the takeover of unions by "opportunistic" socialist politicians and federating their unions together into a "Revolutionary All-Russian Union of Labour".

Novomirskii distinguished himself from other anarcho-syndicalists in rejecting Westernization, cautioning against replicating Western European models of trade unionism in the Russian Empire.

=== Anti-terrorism ===
Novomirskii was publicly critical of the terrorist tactics advocated by the other anarchist schools. He denounced practitioners of "propaganda of the deed" and insurgent organisations such as the Chernoe Znamia, as he believed revolutionary change could only be brought about by the masses, not by small isolated insurgent groups. In spite of this critique, his own anarcho-syndicalist group maintained a "battle detachment" which carried out bank robberies and used the funds to publish their literature, while some even manufactured bombs and explicitly advocated for terrorism. Novomirskii justified this inconsistency by claiming that their actions benefited the whole movement, which distinguished it from the practitioners of "motiveless terror". His critiques of terrorist tactics were taken up by the Russian syndicalist Maksim Rayevsky, who likewise criticised the Chernoe Znamia and called instead for an "organised army of combatants".

=== Anti-intellectualism ===
Novomirskii was also critical of intellectualism within the syndicalist movement, denouncing syndicalist theoreticians that had never worked a day in their lives for "put[ting] abstract ideas above living human beings". Drawing from the anti-intellectualism of Mikhail Bakunin and Jan Wacław Machajski, he warned against the rising influence of social democracy, which he considered to be ideological expressions of the intelligentsia, not the working class. While reaffirming that the social revolution would abolish the state and capitalism, he also declared it would have to abolish intelligentsia's "monopoly of knowledge". He cautioned workers against seeking "saviours" from the upper classes, believing that "the liberation of the workers must be the task of the working class itself".

== Selected works ==
- "Anarcho-Communist Manifesto" (1904)
- "Programma iuzhno-rossiiskoi gruppy Anarkhistov-Sindikalistov" (1906)
- "Iz programmi sindikalnovo anarkhizma" ("Anarchism's trade union programme", 1907)
- "Pis'mo iz Rossii" (1907)
- "Tolko Dusha" (1920)
- "Anarkhicheskoe dvizhenie v Odesse" (1926)

== Bibliography ==
- Avrich, Paul (1971) [1967]. The Russian Anarchists. Princeton: Princeton University Press. ISBN 0-691-00766-7. OCLC 1154930946.
- Shtakser, Inna (2017). "Localized Working-Class Political Violence in Russia's Pale of Settlement, 1906–1907". Studia Judaica. 20 (39): 77–104. doi:10.4467/24500100STJ.17.004.7730.
