= Abram Grossman =

Ukrainian Jewish anarchist revolutionary (1879–1908)

- Абрам Гроссман
- Born: 5 March 1879; Novoukrainka, Yelysavethrad, Kherson, Russian Empire
- Died: 28 February 1908 (aged 28); Kyiv, Russian Empire
- Years active: 1896
- Organization(s): South Russian Workers' Union (1897–1898); SR Combat Organization (1902–1903); Burevestnik (1906–1907); Anarchist-Communist Battle Detachment (1907–1908)
- Movement: Anarchist communism
- Family: Juda Grossman (brother)

Abram Solomonovych Grossman (1879–1908) was a Ukrainian Jewish anarchist revolutionary. Initially a social democrat, he went into exile for his political activities and became radicalised towards revolutionary socialism. After a short stint in the SR Combat Organization, he was imprisoned and again fled into exile, where he moved towards anarchist communism. In the pages of Burevestnik, he took a fiercely critical line against syndicalism and rationalism, instead advocating terrorism and empiricism respectively. Following the Russian Revolution of 1905, he returned to Ukraine a final time in order to establish an anarchist communist "battle detachment", but he was shot by police before he could carry out his plans.

== Biography ==
Abram Grossman was born into a merchant's family. In 1896, he joined the revolutionary movement, initially sympathising with the social democrats. In 1897–1898, he was a member of Yelysavethrad branch of the South Russian Workers' Union. In 1898, he was arrested, and on 9 June 1898, he was internally exiled for three years. In the summer of 1902 he left the Russian Empire for Switzerland, where he established contacts with other political exiles. In late 1902, under the name of M. N. Melenchuk, he illegally entered Saint Petersburg and joined the Socialist Revolutionary Combat Organisation. On 12 January 1903, he was arrested again and imprisoned in the Peter and Paul Fortress, where he met a number of anarchists and himself moved towards anarchism.

In January 1905, he was released, after which he went abroad and became involved in the activities of the exiled anarchist movement, joining the Geneva anarchist communist group and the editorial board of the Burevestnik newspaper. Although Burevestnik usually followed the syndicalist line of the Bread and Freedom group, Grossman was allowed to publish critical works of anti-syndicalism in its pages. He considered French-style syndicalism to be "a specific product of specific French conditions", which could not be easily transposed to Eastern Europe. As a revolutionary socialist, he also reproached "respectable" trade unions and their leadership for reformism and accused them of seeking conciliation with the bourgeoisie, which he considered a threat to rising revolutionary sentiments.

Instead of syndicalism, Grossman openly advocated methods of terror and expropriation in order to further the social revolution. Grossman insisted that conditions in the Russian Empire compelled the movement to conduct "direct, illegal, revolutionary means of warfare" against the Tsarist autocracy, which he believed would end in mass expropriation, rather than a French-style general strike. Grossman believed that the coming anarchist revolution would destroy all aspects of the existing social structure, including trade unions, in what he called a "total and radical negation of all the foundations of the present system."

Drawing from contemporary anti-intellectualism, Grossman also rejected that society was governed by rationality and advised that sociological theory ought to be ignored in favour of empirical psychological statistics. He actively criticised Hegelians and Marxists for their "impersonal rationalism", declaring that:

An idea must not be left to pure understanding, must not be apprehended by reason alone, but must be converted into feeling, must be soaked in "the nerves' juices and the heart's blood." Only feeling, passion, and desire have moved and will move men to acts of heroism and self-sacrifice; only in the realm of passionate life, the life of feeling, do heroes and martyrs draw their strength. [...] We do not belong to the worshipers of "all that is real is rational"; we do not recognize the inevitability of social phenomena; we regard with skepticism the scientific value of many so-called laws of sociology.

In late 1907, he returned to Ukraine in order to establish a network of anarchist communist "battle detachment", himself leading a branch in Katerynoslav. He was involved in organizing an assassination attempt against Alexander von Kaulbars, the commander of the Odesa Military District. In the preparation of combat operations, in February 1908, he was tracked down by the gendarmes and discovered in Kyiv, where he resisted arrest and was shot.

After his death, Juda Grossman took up his brother's polemical opposition to syndicalism in the magazine Buntar, writing that syndicalists focused to much on seeking workplace reforms for skilled laborers while neglecting the "downtrodden majority." Others inspired by Grossman's anti-syndicalist position included the more moderate German Askarov, who distinguished between British-style reformist unionism and French-style syndicalism. He praised the latter for its consistent anti-statism and anti-capitalism, while cautioning against rising authoritarian tendencies within the movement.

== See also ==
- Anarchism in Ukraine

== Bibliography ==
- Avrich, Paul (1971) [1967]. The Russian Anarchists. Princeton: Princeton University Press. ISBN 0-691-00766-7. OCLC 1154930946.
- Krivenkiy, V. V. (1996). "ГРОССМАН Александр Соломонович" [GROSSMAN Alexander Solomonovich]. Political parties of Russia (in Russian). Moscow: ROSSPEN. p. 166. ISBN 5-86004-037-7.
