= Maksim Rayevsky =

Russian anarchist (died 1931)

Maksim Rayevsky (Russian: Максим Раевский) (born 1880 in Nizhyn; died 1931 in Moscow) was a Russian-Jewish anarcho-syndicalist.

== Early life and education ==
Rayevsky was born Lev Iosifovich Fishelev in Nizhyn, Russia, into a wealthy Jewish family. He was educated at the gymnasium in Nizhyn and attended university in Germany.

== Work ==
After university, Rayevsky became an anarcho-syndicalist and moved to Paris, where he and Nikolai Rogdaev founded Burevestnik ("The Stormy Petrel"), which was described by anarchist historian Paul Avrich as "the most important anarchist journal of the postrevolutionary period" (i.e., after the Russian Revolution of 1905). They published it from 1906 to 1910. In its pages, Rayevsky criticized anti-syndicalists and anarchist practitioners of propaganda of the deed.

When World War I began, Rayevsky livied in New York City, serving as editor of Golos Truda ("The Voice of Labour"). Golos Truda was the official newspaper of the Union of Russian Workers in the United States and Canada, whose membership exceeded 10,000. Not long after the February Revolution in Russia, Rayevsky left New York and traveled to Petrograd. He sailed on the same ship as Trotsky in May 1917. Two months later, he was joined by the rest of the Golos Truda staff, who had decided to move to Russia en masse.

In Petrograd, Rayevsky edited the first issue of Golos Truda. Shortly thereafter, he suddenly left the anarchist movement. Trotsky helped Rayevsky get a non-political job in the new Soviet government. In the late 1920s, Rayevsky is reported to have been arrested for printing a Trotskyite publication.

== Death ==
Rayevsky died of a heart attack in Moscow in 1931.

== Notes ==
- Avrich, Paul (1988). Anarchist Portraits. Princeton, N.J.: Princeton University Press. ISBN 0-691-04753-7.
- Avrich, Paul (1995). Anarchist Voices: An Oral History of Anarchism in America. Princeton, N.J.: Princeton University Press. ISBN 0-691-03412-5.
- Avrich, Paul (1967). The Russian Anarchists. Princeton, N.J.: Princeton University Press. OCLC 266518.
- Rublew, Dmitri (2017). "Lew Fischelew (Maxim Rajewskij): Die Biografie und Ideen eines vergessenen Theoretikers des russischen Anarchismus des beginnenden zwanzigsten Jahrhunderts" [Lev Fishelev (Maxim Rajevski): The Life and Ideas of a Forgotten Theorist of Early Twentieth-Century Russian Anarchism]. Ne Znam. Zeitschrift für Anarchismusforschung (in German) (6): 3–29.
