= Burevestnik (1906) =

- Founded: 1906
- Ceased publication: 1910
- Political alignment: Anarchist
- Language: Russian
- Headquarters: Paris
- OCLC number: 34127800

Burevestnik (Russian: Буревестник) was a Russian language anarchist periodical published in Paris between 1906 and 1910. It had the subtitle 'Organ of the Russian Anarchist Communists'. The publication was the most prominent periodical of Russian anarchist émigrés in the aftermath of the Russian Revolution of 1905. It was edited by Maksim Rayevsky and Nikolai Rogdaev. Nineteen issues of Burevestnik were published during its five years of existence.

The name Burevestnik was inspired by Maxim Gorky's poem "The Song of the Stormy Petrel" (Песня о Буревестнике). The masthead of the publication carried the final line of the poem, Let the tempest come strike harder! (Пусть сильнее грянет буря!).

The publication included lengthy debates on the use of terrorism as well as information on the activities of the anarchist movement in Russia. Burevestnik generally adhered to the political line from the Kropotkinite Bread and Freedom group, although anti-syndicalist viewpoints were also expressed in some of its articles (through the participation of Abram Grossman). Between 1906 and 1907, Grossman used the signature "A -" in Burevestnik. He vehemently accused the Kropotkinists of conflating syndicalism and anarchism, stating that they had been led astray by the French labour movement. Instead, he called for "direct, illegal, revolutionary means of warfare" to be applied in Russia.

Articles from the Burevestnik Paris groups were often reproduced in the New York-based publication Golos Truda, which Rayevsky edited when he moved to the US.

== Sources ==
- Avrich, Paul (2005). The Russian Anarchists. AK Press. ISBN 978-1-904859-48-2.
