= Revolutionary Confederation of Anarcho-Syndicalists =

Ukrainian anarchist organisation

Revolutionary Confederation of Anarcho-Syndicalists Революційна Конфедерація Анархістів-Синдикалістів
- Secretary-General: Sergei Shevchenko
- Founded: 15 October 1994
- Dissolved: 6 April 2014
- Headquarters: Donetsk
- Newspaper: Anarchy
- Membership (2000): 2,000
- Ideology: Platformism; Anarcho-syndicalism
- Political position: Far-left

Website
- rkas.org.ua

The Revolutionary Confederation of Anarcho-Syndicalists (Ukrainian: Революційна Конфедерація Анархістів-Синдикалістів; RKAS) was a Ukrainian platformist organisation. It was founded in Donetsk in 1994, following the dissolution of the Soviet Union and Ukrainian independence. The organisation spread throughout the country and was involved with a number of students' and workers' movements.

Noted for its strict military discipline and hierarchical structure, the RKAS was often criticised for authoritarianism and conservatism by other members of the anarchist movement, some of whom likened it to a cult of personality. This caused a number of splits within the organisation, the largest of which rendered it functionally defunct in 2011.

Although the organisation was officially critical of the Revolution of Dignity, a number of its members still joined the barricades, while a former member was a known participant in the Anti-Maidan. The organisation dissolved following the outbreak of the War in Donbas, with former members going on to prosecute guerrilla warfare against the Donetsk People's Republic or aid Ukrainian refugees that had fled Donbas.

== History ==
=== Formation and growth ===
When the Ukrainian anarchist movement began to experience a resurgence during the 1980s, some within the nascent movement began to criticise it for its "lack of strategy". Anarchist groups and individuals in the southeastern city of Donetsk came together to form a new organisation, in order to provide an alternative to what they saw as a "chaotic movement". The RKAS was established in Donetsk in 1994, and within a few years had grown and spread throughout Ukraine.

The RKAS quickly joined the nascent Ukrainian workers' movements, gaining particular prominence within the Donbas miners' unions and strike committees. They published a number of publications, notably including the newspaper Anarchy, which ran for most of the organisation's existence. They also published the Anarcho-Syndicalist Newsletter & Analytical Bulletin, as well as ones with specific focuses, such as the workers' newspaper Voice of Labour, the student newspaper Unity and the youth magazine Revolutionary Ukraine.

It was also active in cooperative initiatives, transport workers' unions, and the student movement; and was noted for its summer training camps and engagement in street fights against the Ukrainian far-right. The RKAS militias, known as the Black Guard, was established along federalist lines and trained in martial arts. Its educational initiatives, aiming to create an anarcho-syndicalist subculture in Ukraine, involved establishing an Anarchist School. The RKAS also attempted to establish an all-Ukrainian anarcho-syndicalist union, which they planned to be called the "General Confederation of Anarcho-Syndicalist Labour" (CGT-AU), but this project was eventually halted as the conditions in Ukraine changed.

By the turn of the 21st century, the organisation counted 2,000 active members. It grew to such an extent that it established short-lived international chapters in Georgia and Israel, and counted supporters in Russia and Bulgaria. Although expected to affiliate with the International Workers' Association (IWA), it was never on the organisation's agenda during its early years. In 2001, the RKAS instead supported the establishment of the International Libertarian Solidarity (ILS), as well as its successor – the Anarkismo network – in 2003. The RKAS entered into organisational remission the following year, but reconstituted itself by 2007 with the publication of a new programme inspired by the statues of the Industrial Workers of the World (IWW).

=== Criticisms and divisions ===
The RKAS has been criticised for a perceived authoritarianism and conservatism, particularly due to its practice of strict military discipline and maintenance of a hierarchical structure, as well as its suspicion of postmodernism. It was harshly criticised by the IWA, which described the RKAS as a "platformist party and psychosect" and accused it of collaborating with "neo-fascist" elements. It has also been described as having fostered a cult of personality around its leader, Sergei Shevchenko, known by the pseudonym "Samurai". In an interview, one prospective member spoke of a "hierarchical and authoritarian" culture that they observed at an RKAS summer camp, reporting that "they have some rituals where (the) woman within the movement feeds their master, Samurai". They continued:

"[RKAS] have a very radical mindset, they read Kropotkin and fight with each other and shoot guns. No idea where they get them from, and this Samurai has a lot of accounts in different social medias and messengers. He writes that [other anarchist groups in Ukraine] have no good 1st of May demonstrations because they are not disciplined enough when they march."

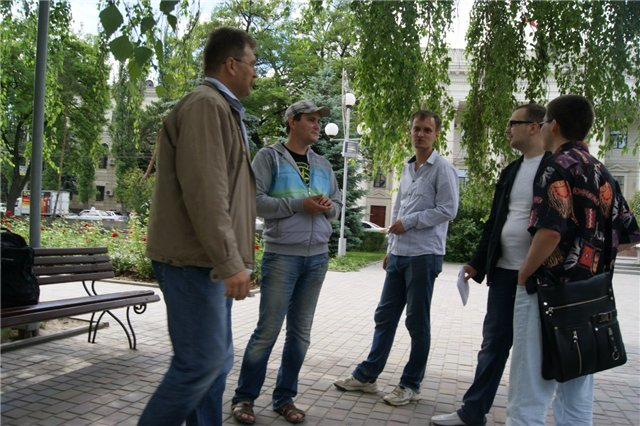
Members of the International Union of Anarchists at "Hyde Park Corner", in Volgograd, June 2012

This organisational structure resulted in a high turnover of new members, as activists often left to start new organisations and were replaced with a new, younger generation. In 2011, the organisation experienced a massive split, with the breakaway of an organisation that came to be known as the International Union of Anarchists (Ukrainian: Міжнародний союз анархістів; MSA). The MSA denounced what they saw as a "dictatorship" within the RKAS leadership, and attempted to form a rival organisation, although Shevchenko claims that it ended up functionally defunct by June 2014. The split also rendered the remains of the RKAS relatively passive.

=== Dissolution ===
Already functionally defunct by the time of the Revolution of Dignity, the RKAS criticised the revolutionary movement as "bourgeois nationalism". Shevchenko claimed that anarchists who joined the Maidan would be committing "political suicide", noting the presence of the far-right within the movement. While the RKAS officially called for an increased focus on workers' rights, individual members of the RKAS would end up fighting on the barricades of the Maidan anyway. One former member of the RKAS also participated in the Anti-Maidan movement in Donetsk, joining a unit of the Workers' Front and collaborating with Russian-backed separatists, in the hope of achieving nationalisation and workers' control.

The ideological divisions over the Maidan would lead to the complete collapse of the RKAS, with Shevchenko lamenting the absence of a coherent anarchist organisation capable of transforming the Maidan's "political revolution" into a "social revolution". By the outbreak of the War in Donbas, the RKAS found that the peacetime conditions that the organisation had been established in no longer existed. In April 2014, the organisation decided to dissolve itself. Some former members established "illegal combat groups" to conduct guerrilla warfare against the separatists in Donbas, while others aided refugees from the region.

=== Later activities ===
In the wake of the full-scale Russian invasion of Ukraine, some former members of the RKAS joined the Territorial Defense Forces (TDF) in order to resist the invasion. During this period, misinformation about the RKAS circulated within Greek anarchist circles, depicting the RKAS as part of the Anti-Maidan movement or as collaborators with the Donetsk People's Republic. Former members denied the charges and had the offending articles pulled from the publishing websites, but expressed surprise that "many people in Europe and America prefer to get information about the anarchist or socialist movement in Ukraine not from Ukrainian anarchists or socialists, but from anyone outside Ukraine".

== Organisational structure ==
The organisation of the RKAS was structured hierarchically and enforced strict discipline among its membership. The RKAS claimed to have inherited much of its organisational structure from the Makhnovshchina and the Revolutionary Insurgent Army of Ukraine (RIAU). The activities of the RKAS were coordinated by an Organisational Bureau, modelled after the Military Revolutionary Council of the Makhnovshchina. The Bureau consisted of: Sergei Shevchenko as Secretary General, an international secretary, the editor of Anarchy, the commander of the Black Guard militia, the finance director, the media head and a union representative. Members accused of breaking the organisation's code of conduct were subjected to an "Arbitral Tribunal", which mediated internal disputes.

== Bibliography ==
- Akai, Laure; Tsovma, Mikhail (1995). "After the Fall: A New Beginning for Russian Anarchism?". Red & Black Revolution. No. 2. Workers' Solidarity Movement. pp. 26–27. OCLC 62675392.
- Gorbach, Denys (30 September 2015). "Anarchism in Makhno's homeland: adventures of the red-and-black flag". OpenDemocracy. ISSN 1476-5888.
- Ishchenko, Volodymyr (2016). "New left organisations, unions, initiatives". The Ukrainian left during and after the Maidan protests. European United Left/Nordic Green Left. pp. 17–21. doi:10.13140/RG.2.2.23614.69447.
- Łaniewski, Aleksander (2022). ""Мир хатам, війна палацам!" Ukraińscy anarchiści wobec teorii i praktyk Euromajdanu" ["Peace to the huts! War on the palaces!" Anarchists towards the theories and practices of Euromaidan]. Rocznik Instytutu Europy Środkowo-Wschodniej (in Polish). 20 (3): 237–259. doi:10.36874/RIESW.2022.3.11. ISSN 1732-1395. S2CID 255673793.
- Schmidt, Michael (5 December 2014). "The neo-Makhnovist revolutionary project in Ukraine". Anarkismo.net. Zabalaza Anarchist Communist Front.
- Tarinski, Yavor (4 October 2022). ""Leftists" outside Ukraine are used to listening only to people from Moscow: Interview with anarcho-syndicalists in Eastern Ukraine". Aftoleksi. Translated by Freedom. ISSN 0016-0504.
- Wishart, Alexandra (2 September 2019). The Radical Left in Ukraine since Maidan: The Case of the National Anarchist Movement (PDF) (Masters thesis). University of Glasgow. pp. 47–49.
