= Contemporary Architecture (journal) =

Contemporary Architecture (Russian: Современная архитектура, Romanized: Sovremennaia arkhitektura) was a Soviet architectural journal published in Moscow. The journal ran from 1926 to 1930, releasing six issues per year, with occasional publications of "double issues." It was published by the OSA Group (Organization of Contemporary Architects), a group of constructivist architects. Contemporary Architecture served as a platform for presenting and illustrating the constructivists' project of revolutionizing residential living for a socialist society in the twentieth century and put forward new ideas on numerous theoretical topics and innovative new projects in the field of architecture.

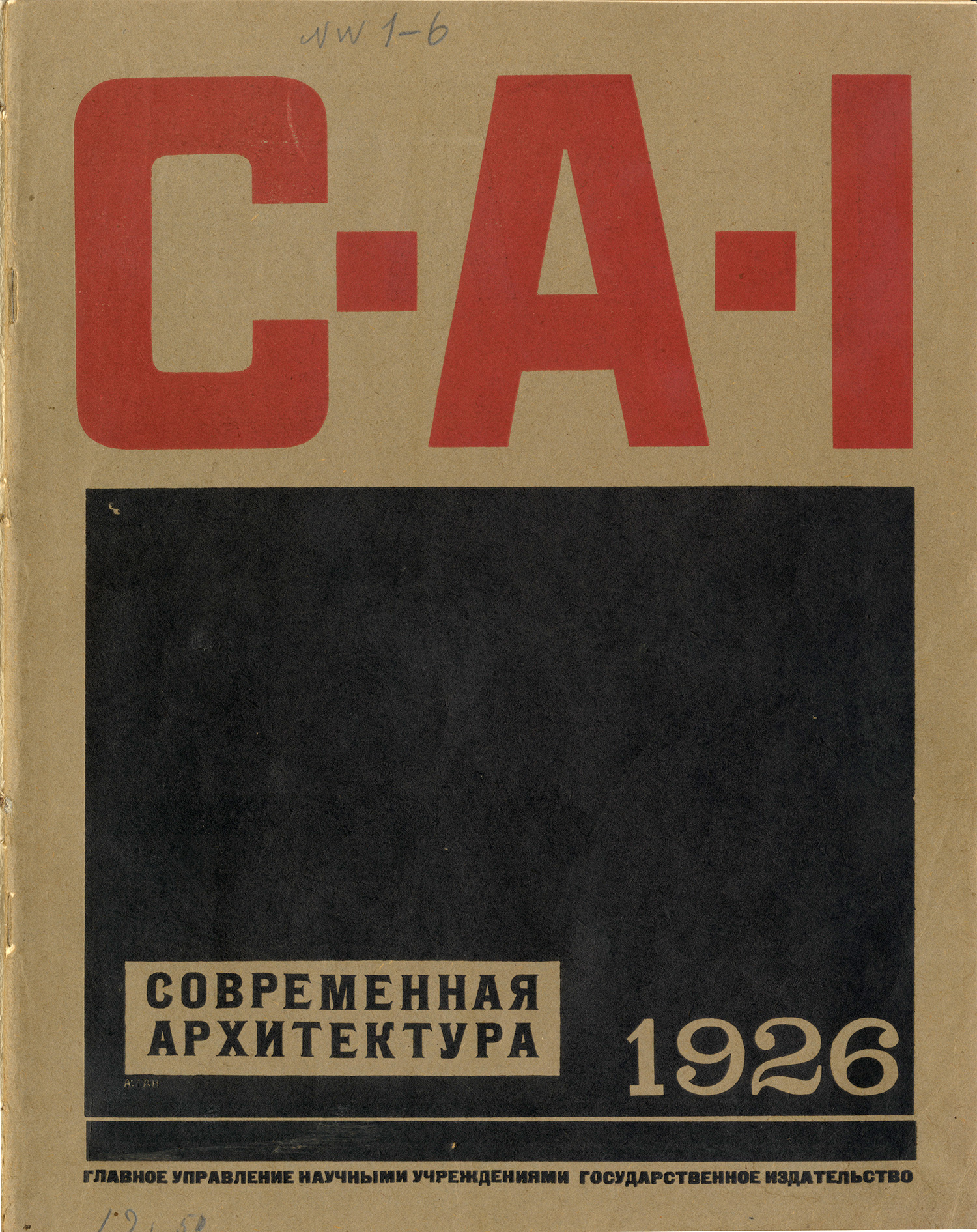
Cover of first Contemporary Architecture issue, 1926

== History ==
In 1925, the Artistic Division of the People's Commissariat for Education of the Russian Soviet Federative Socialist Republic decided to organize the publication of a new architectural journal. Pavel Novitsky, the head of the division, tasked Moisei Ginzburg with this project. Ginzburg proposed that the architectural group of the Institute of Artistic Culture become the publisher of the journal and, in consultation with the leaders of the group, that the journal would be the instrument of a new creative movement: architectural constructivism. Later that year, Ginzburg and Alexander Vesnin created a new group of like-minded constructivist architects known as the Organization of Contemporary Architects (OSA Group). The OSA Group became the publishers of Contemporary Architecture. The backside of the cover of the first issue from 1926 offered this statement from the editors:

The Journal of Contemporary Architecture is primarily the result of the work of the members of the Organization of Contemporary Architects (OSA), united by common architectural views and aspirations. Nevertheless, Contemporary Architecture does not intend to be locked into its inner circle. On the contrary, the editors strive in every possible way to systematically reflect all the exciting issues of our architectural modernity. And in precisely the same way, Contemporary Architecture widely opens its pages to all its like-minded people, scattered not only within confines of the USSR, but throughout the whole world.

Among major peer architectural organizations in the Soviet Union during the 1920s, only OSA had its own periodical print journal, Contemporary Architecture, that published regularly, unlike a few publications that were released annually or otherwise irregularly. While a few other journals were approved for print, they only lasted for one or two issues, whereas Contemporary Architecture boasted twenty-seven issues, including three "double-issues," over its five-year run.

It was during this time that the theoretical and professional foundations of a new creative movement of architectural constructivism were developed. In its early stages, Contemporary Architecture focused primarily on identifying the constructive practicability of a new architectural form. Later, the journal became concerned with combating eclecticism and stylization in the spirit of a "constructive style." The journal adopted slogans such as: "Down with eclecticism!"; "Long live the functional method of thinking!"; "Long live constructivism!" The more theoretical articles in the journal repeatedly underscored that constructivism was not a new style, but an entirely new method of creativity that demanded a correspondingly new attitude towards design, function, and form in the production of art.

The journal's final issue was published in 1930 and included an editorial piece, entitled "1926-1930," summarizing the activities and achievements of Contemporary Architecture and OSA during those five years. That same year, OSA and other previously independent Moscow-based architectural organizations entered into the Moscow Branch of the All-Union Architectural and Scientific Society (MOVANO). MOVANO planned to create a new architectural journal on the basis of Contemporary Architecture, and in the final issue of Contemporary Architecture, there was an advertisement for the upcoming Revolutionary Architecture journal. However, this journal never reached publication.

== Organization ==
Vesnin and Ginzburg jointly served as the editors-in-chief of Contemporary Architecture from 1926 to 1928. In 1929, an ordinance was issued requiring all scientific publications to have only one editor-in-chief. Ginzburg was selected for the role, and he was listed as the sole editor-in-chief for all 1929 issues. However, beginning with the first "double issue" of 1930, Vesnin was once again listed alongside Ginzburg as an editor-in-chief in the 1930 issues.

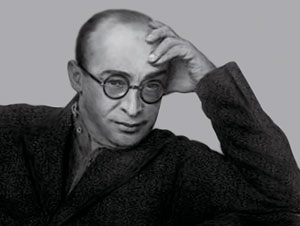
Moisei Ginzburg, editor-in-chief of Contemporary Architecture

Besides Vesnin and Ginzburg, the original editors of Contemporary Architecture were: Andrei Burov, Viktor Vesnin, Georgii Vegman, Ilya Golosov, Aleksei Gan, Artur Loleit, Georgii Orlov, and Ivan Sobolev. The majority of these editors stayed with Contemporary Architecture for its entire five-year run. Other editors who joined later include: Vyacheslav Vladimirov (1926), Sergei Maslikh (1926), Ivan Matsa (1926), Pavel Novitskii, (1926), Alexander Pasternak (1927), Alexander Nikolsky (1927), Mikhail Barshch (1927), Ivan Leonidov (1928), Nikolai Krasilnikov (1928), I. Muravev (1928), N. Sokolov (1928), M. Kholostenko (1928), F. Yalovkin (1928), Roman Khiger (1928), and Anatolii Fisenko (1928). In 1930, Khiger was promoted to the position of deputy editor-in-chief. The Swiss French architect Le Corbusier also briefly participated as an editor for a couple of issues.

Many of the earlier issues also list collaborators involved in the making of Contemporary Architecture. A list of collaborators from the journal's first issue in 1926 includes: Leonid Vesnin, Zholtkevich, Zilbert, Alexander Ivanitsky, Nikolai Kolli, Vasilii Kashkarov, Vasilii Kalish, German Krasin, Alexander Kurovsky, Genrikh Karlsen, V. Krasilnikov, S. Livshitz, Ivan Leonidov, Sergei Maslikh, A. Mordvinov, I. Muravev, Edgar Norwerth, Alexander Pasternak, Mikhail Parusnikov, Alexander Rodchenko, Vladimir Ragozinsky, A. Toporkov, B. Shvetsov, and Pavel Ettinger.

== Content ==
From the beginning, Contemporary Architecture was committed to the socialist project and the constructivist ideology: "Constructivism, born from the revolution and forming its working method in a period of the building of new economic relationships, in a period of the building of socialism, first and foremost, more persistently than anything else dictates to the architect the invention of new types of architecture." Thus, many of the projects and arguments that the journal put forward subscribe to a methodology that rethinks architectural forms from a functional, utilitarian, rationalized perspective. The journal was tasked with demonstrating that "contemporary architecture must crystallize the new socialist way of life."

While primarily catering to concerns relevant for the nascent socialist society of the Soviet Union, the journal was rather internationally minded, as well. Multiple issues featured the journal's name in German and French, in addition to Russian, on the front covers. Many later issues also included advertisements in French, German, English, and Italian for subscribing to the journal. One can also find various phrases and translations of article titles throughout the issues in other languages, most often German.

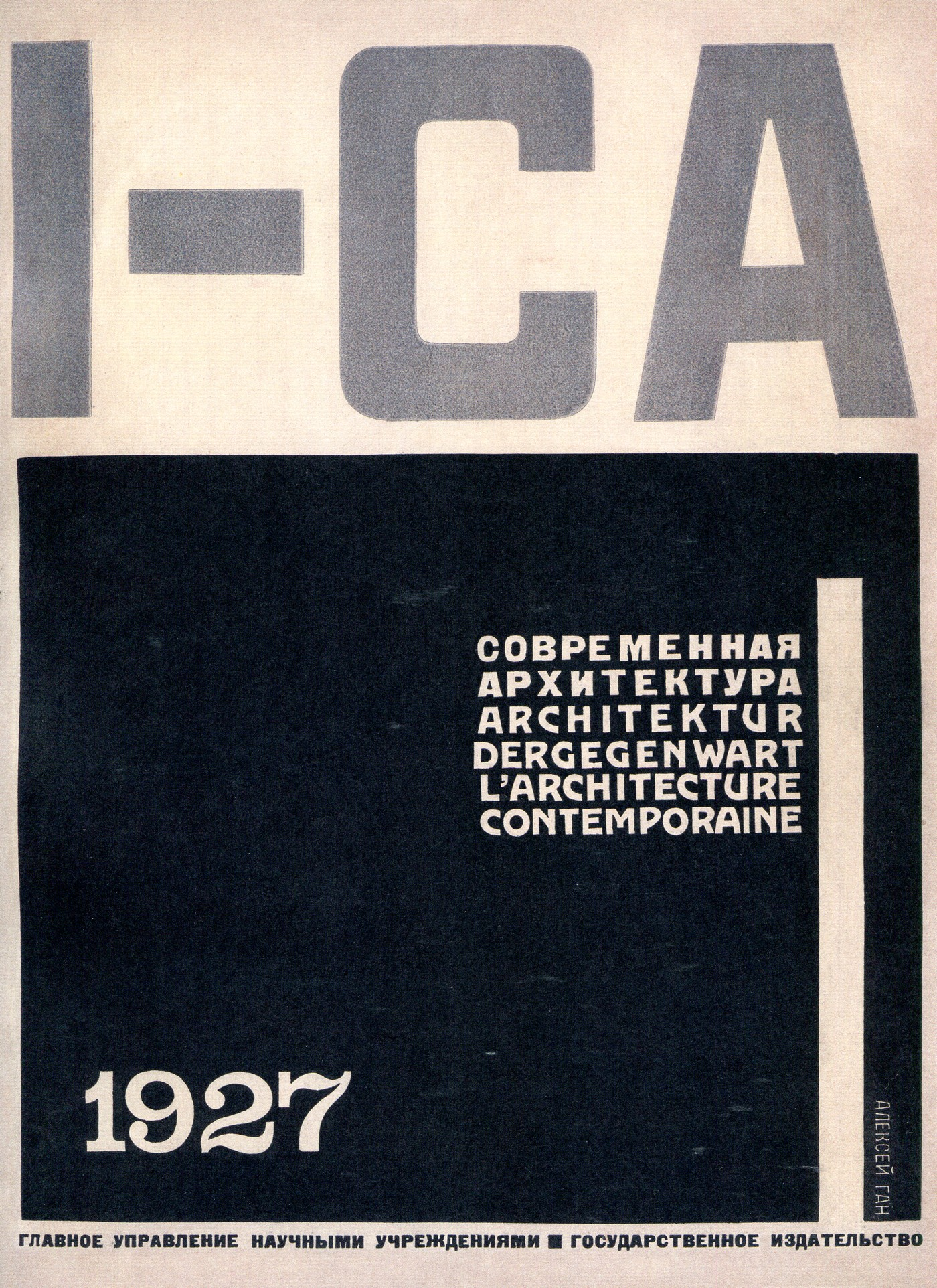
Cover with journal title written in Russian, German, and French

More substantially, the contributors were also concerned with architectural developments in Western Europe and the United States. For instance, one of the longest articles in the first issue of 1928, entitled "Contemporary Housing," looked to the German Weissenhof Estate to provide an example of how to solve the problem of mass construction of housing with considerations for the efficient use of time and materials. Additionally, it included a normative discussion of technology and its social implications, another theme that Contemporary Architecture frequently took up. The author noted that "Weissenhof outlines the path along which the construction of modernity must go, the path of the housewife's liberation from superfluous expenditure of energy. Modernity demands the immediate application of all the achievements of technology... for the restoration of the worker's energy spent during the day and for the liberation of his wife for participation in public life."

Four of the 1929 issues indicated their overarching theme on their respective covers. The theme for the first 1929 issue was "Contemporary Housing" as it showcased what new progressive forms of architecture Contemporary Architecture promoted. For example, the journal articulated a vision for "the communal home," defined as a complex of studio apartments with a communal dining room, kitchen, recreational rooms, and bathrooms. The following issue's theme was "Light and Color," and it featured articles discussing where to acquire natural paints, their chemical compositions, comparisons of colors by how much light they absorb or reflect, etc. One article, "Color and Work," examined the findings of experiments measuring the impact of different colors on worker productivity. The other specifically themed 1929 issues were the third and sixth, entitled "Constructions of Culture and Relaxation" and "Dneprostroi," respectively.

The special "double-issue" of 1930 presented the journal's arguably most grandiose theory: socialist resettlement. According to this theory, both the village and the city are obsolete forms of population organization. Moreover, "they hinder the correct placement of industry and agriculture, they hinder the development of new social relations of people." In this view, the village is a setting for the extraction of raw materials, which are then transported to cities in order to be processed. At the same time, people naturally organize their place of dwelling in accordance with their economic function, leading to the overcrowding of cities and the thinning out of villages. In order to fix this settlement imbalance, Contemporary Architecture argued, industry should leave from the city centers and go out to the districts where the production of raw materials takes place. From there, "the unification of industry and agriculture into one whole also will be the new condition for the placement of dwellings, for the resettlement of people." This unification would ostensibly lead to the extinction of cities and villages as models of social living as well as disparities in population distribution, allowing for a more socialist form of population configuration to emerge.
