= Chernoe Znamia =

Russian anarcho-communist organisation

Chernoe Znamia (The Black Banner)
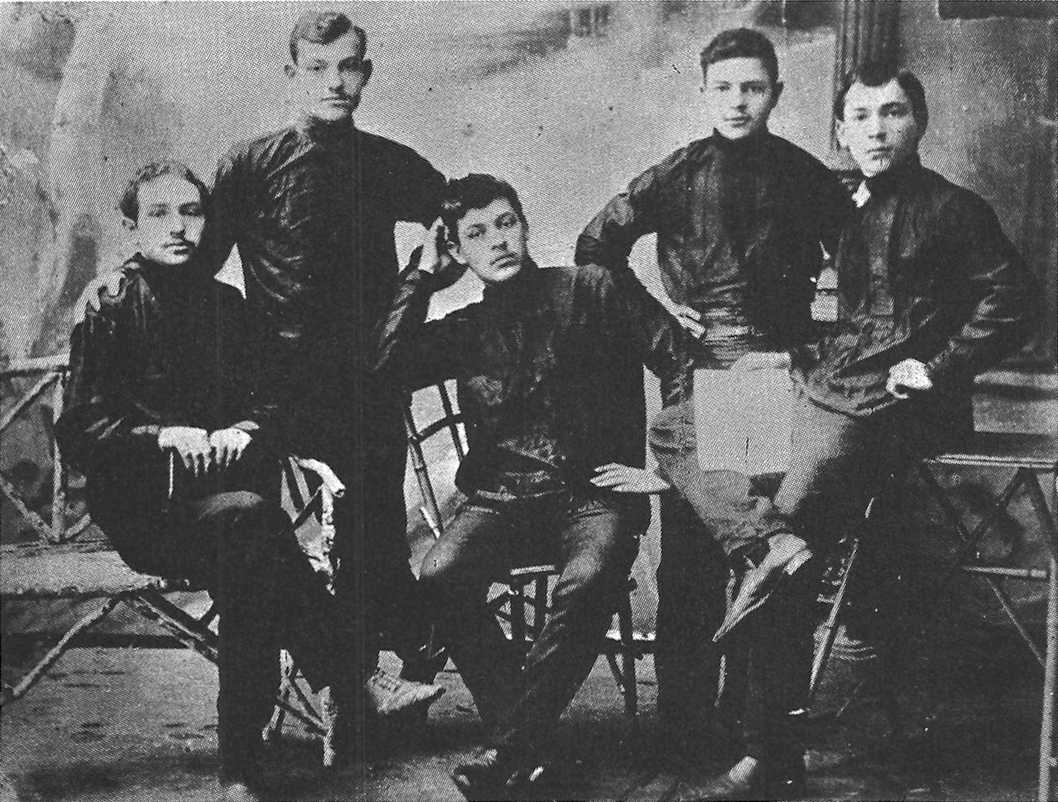
- A meeting of the Chernoznamentsy in Minsk in 1906.
- Dates active: 1903–1908
- Active regions: Western and southern regions of the Russian Empire.
- Ideology: Anarchism (Anarcho-communism)

Chernoe Znamia (or Chornoe Znamia) (Russian: Чёрное знамя, English: The Black Banner), known as the Chernoznamentsy, was a Russian anarchist communist organisation. It emerged in 1903 as a federation of cadres. It took its name, "The Black Banner", from the anarchist black flag.

== Composition ==
The largest collection of anarchist terrorists in Imperial Russia, Chernoe Znamia attracted its strongest following in the western and southern provinces at the frontier of the Empire, including nearly all anarchists in Białystok. Their ranks included mostly students, factory workers and artisans, though there were also peasants, unemployed labourers, drifters, and self-professed Nietzschean supermen. Ethnically, Jews predominated, and many members were of Ukrainian, Polish and Great Russian nationality. The typical age of the Chernoznamentsy was nineteen or twenty, and some of the most active adherents were as young as fifteen years old.

== Tactics and ideology ==
We recognise isolated expropriations only to acquire money for our revolutionary deeds. If we get the money, we do not kill the person we are expropriating. But this does not mean that he, the property owner, has bought us off. No! We will find him in the various cafés, restaurants, theatres, balls, concerts, and the like. Death to the bourgeois! Always, wherever he may be, he will be overtaken by an anarchist's bomb or bullet.

— The declaration of a Chernoznamenets in Odessa to the judges officiating at his trial.

With a history marked, in the words of historian Paul Avrich, by "reckless fanaticism and uninterrupted violence", the Chernoznamensty were the first anarchist group with a deliberate policy of terror against the established order. They saw merit in every act of propaganda by the deed, no matter how intemperate and senseless it appeared to the public, as evoking the lust of the underclass for vengeance against their tormentors. Along with the equally fanatical Beznachalie ("Without Authority"), Chernoe Znamia was the most conspicuous anarchist communist organisation in Russia.

== See also ==
- Anarchism in Russia
- Narodnaya Volya, a similar organisation of an earlier generation
