= Nikolai Rogdaev =

Russian anarchist (1880–1934)

Nikolai Ignatievich Rogdaev
- Николай Игнатьевич Рогдаев
- Born: Nikolaj Ignatijevič Rogdajev; 1880; Shilkino, Klinsky Uyezd, Moscow, Russian Empire
- Died: 1934 (aged 53–54); Tashkent, Uzbek Soviet Socialist Republic
- Years active: 1898–1929
- Movement: Anarcho-communism

Nikolai Ignatievich Rogdaev (Shilkino, Klinsky Uyezd, Moscow, 1880 – Tashkent, 1934) was a leader of the Russian anarchist movement.

== Biography ==
A Czech by nationality, he took part in the revolutionary movement from the late 1890s, at first becoming close to the Socialist-Revolutionary Party. In 1902 he emigrated abroad, where he became an anarchist, joining some of the first Russian anarchist organizations abroad. In 1905–1907 he was one of the organizers of anarcho-communist groups in Kyiv and Yekaterinoslav. In 1907 he took part in the International Anarchist Congress of Amsterdam, where he made reports on the anarchist and syndicalist movement in Russia. From July 1908, he was editor-in-chief of the socio-political newspaper Burevestnik, the central organ of the eponymous Geneva Anarchist Communist Group.

In 1914 Rogdaev fell victim to a provocation by Zakhar Vyrovy, a former member of the State Duma who collaborated with the police. Vladimir Burtsev, a hunter for police informants, received information about a provocation among the anarchists. However, as a result of some tactical moves, Vyrovy had broken up a group of communist anarchists who began to suspect each other of betraying each other. As a result, suspicion fell not on Vyrovy, but on Rogdaev. On this occasion, the Minister of Foreign Affairs, Alexander Krasilnikov, reported with satisfaction to the Police Department: "The Rogdaev case led to the fact that the existence of the co-organized Parisian federation of anarchist-communists can be considered complete." Soon after the Rogdaev case, Vyrova left this group of anarchists.

In 1917, Rogdaev returned to Russia, was a supporter of cooperation with the Bolsheviks, and was engaged in propaganda work, supervising Soviet propaganda in Turkestan. From 1923 he was an employee of the Peter Kropotkin Museum in Moscow. During the conflict with the anarcho-mystics within the All-Russian Public Committee for the perpetuation of the memory of Peter Kropotkin, Rogdaev supported Alexei Borovoi. In 1927, together with Borovoi and other well-known anarchists (among them Alexander Atabekian, Nikolai Lebedev, Vladimir Barmash, German Askarov and Lydia Gogelia), apparently with the approval of the Moscow Soviet, Rogdaev protested publicly against the execution of Sacco and Vanzetti.

In the spring and summer of 1929, Rogdaev and other supporters of Borovoi in Moscow were arrested by the OGPU. In 1930, he was sentenced to 3 years of political isolation by the OGPU Collegium on charges of resuming active anarchist activities, ties with "anarcho-emigration" and anti-Soviet agitation. He served his term in the Suzdal political isolator. Then he was exiled to Tashkent, where he suffered a cerebral hemorrhage and fell down in the street. He died, coincidentally, in Via Sacco and Vanzetti.
