= Zinoviev =

Zinoviev, Zinovyev, Zinovieff (Russian: Зино́вьев), or Zinovieva (feminine; Зино́вьева), as a Russian surname, derives from the personal name Zinovi, from Greek Zenobios. Notable people with the surname include:

- Alexander Dmitrievich Zinoviev (1854–1931), Russian politician (Governor of St Petersburg) under Nicholas II
- Alexander Zinoviev (1922–2006), Russian logician, sociologist, writer, and satirist
- Grigory Zinoviev (1883–1936), Bolshevik revolutionary and Soviet politician
- Ivan Zinoviev (1905–1942), NKVD captain and Hero of the Soviet Union
- Peter Zinovieff (1933–2021), British inventor
- Lydia Zinovieva-Annibal (1866–1907), a Russian writer
- Sauli Zinovjev (b. 1988), Finnish composer
- Sergei Zinovjev (born 1980), Russian ice hockey player
- Sofka Zinovieff (b. 1961), a British journalist and author
- Nikolai Zinoviev, fictional character from the video game Resident Evil 3: Nemesis

== See also ==
- Zinoviev letter, a fraudulent letter that sparked a political scandal in Britain in 1924
- Russian destroyer Azard (1916), later renamed Zinoviev
