= Olga Schor =

Russian art and literary historian

- Ольга Александровна Шор
- Born: 20 September 1894; Moscow, Russian Empire
- Died: 11 May 1978; Rome, Italy
- Occupations: art historian; literary historian

Olga Aleksandrovna Schor (Russian: Ольга Александровна Шор, also known as Olga Deschartes, 1894–1978) was an art and literary historian. She was also the companion of poet, writer and philosopher Vyacheslav Ivanovich Ivanov during his Italian exile.

About

Born into a prominent Moscow family of musicians and intellectuals, Olga Schor received her philosophical training in Russia and Germany. After the Revolution of 1917, she worked in the People's Commissariat of Education and the State Academy of Arts and met Vyacheslav Ivanov in 1924, on the eve of the poet's departure to Italy. For three years, O. A. Schor was his official representative in the USSR, responsible for copyright protection, publications, and forwarding the Central Commission for the Improvement of the Welfare of Scientists' grant to Italy, as V. I. Ivanov was considered to be on a business trip abroad. In 1927 she moved to Italy with the Ivanovs, worked as a guide in Rome and as a clerk in Pavia, in 1928–1932 she worked on the preface of the Italian edition of Correspondence from Two Corners by V. I. Ivanov and M. O. Gershenzon, after 1934 she devoted herself entirely to maintaining Ivanov's household and working capacity. After his death in 1949 she wrote a continuation of the philosophical poem The Story of Svetomir the Tsarevich, calling it the fulfillment of the poet's will, began to publish the collection of works of V. Ivanov. Ivanov, for which she wrote a biography-prediction (1971). She died and was buried in Rome; she never took Italian citizenship. O. Schor's own works on the Italian Renaissance and religious philosophy remained mostly in manuscript, the work on Michelangelo was published in 2011 and 2017 as a whole and in fragments; in 2023 manuscript materials on O. Schor's own philosophical system Mnemology were published. Olga Alexandrovna's archive is stored in the Vyacheslav Ivanov Research Center in Rome and has been dismantled since 2023.

== Biography ==
=== Formative period ===
Olga Schor Schor was born into a famous Moscow artistic family: she was a cousin of the Zionist intellectual E. D. Schor and a niece of the pianist David Schor. Her father Aleksandr Solomonovich Schor (1864–1939) owned a piano factory and worked as a tuner in Soviet times. Her mother Rosa Moiseyevna was a member of the Society of Free Aesthetics, her sister Vera was a violinist, and her brother Yuri (1896–1960) was a cellist. Olga herself graduated with honors by the Moscow Women's Gymnasium of Princess S. N. Golitsyna. During her high school years, Olga Schor, as she put it, "smuggled" (as it was forbidden by the rules of the educational institutions of the Russian Empire), attended lectures by Vyacheslav Ivanov, who gave classes at the Society of Free Aesthetics. Leo Tolstoy visited Schor's house, and Olga, despite her young age, remembered her parents' interaction with him. She was baptized in the Lesser Church of the Ascension in Bolshaya Nikitskaya Street; it was a conscious choice of Olga Alexandrovna. Since 1911 she studied at the philosophical faculty of the Higher Women's Courses, where G. Speth taught; in the summer semester of 1912 she attended a series of lectures by Rickert at the University of Freiburg and joined the circle of Russian neo-Kantians (S. Hesse, F. Stepun). In 1916, she presented her dissertation on Fichte's gnoseology theory. In 1918–1922, she worked as a lecturer at the People's University under the People's Commissariat of Education, in 1923–1926 – at the State Academy of Arts and Sciences (according to some information she cooperated with the State Academy of Arts and Sciences since 1921 and even participated in its foundation). According to Lydia Ivanova, during the World War I, Olga Schor was acquainted with the Indians who came to Russia, one of whom was even going to marry, nursed from typhoid Suhrawardy, friendship with whom she maintained for many years. F. Stepun's memoirs mention the "academy" that met at Berdyaev's house in the first post-revolutionary years, and whose meetings were always attended by the "intelligent, versatile, educated and very talented" Olga Alexandrovna Schor. It was from her that Stepun learned of the publication of Spengler's The Decline of the West.

=== Life period with Vyacheslav Ivanov ===
External images
- | A 1931 photo taken in Pavia
- | Photo at the Capitol in 1938

The acquaintance with V. I. Ivanov took place in Moscow in the house of M. Gershenzon in 1924, when the poet moved from Baku to the capital, preparing to leave for Italy. Until 1927, on behalf of Ivanov Olga Alexandrovna was engaged in publishing his books in the USSR, copyright protection, represented the interests of Vyacheslav Ivanovich in the Central Commission for the Improvement of the Welfare of Scientists and Narkompros (the poet was considered to be on a foreign business trip). Between 1924 and 1926, O.A. Schor regularly reported to Vyacheslav Ivanovich from Moscow to Rome. In 1927, O.A. Schor left Moscow and traveled to Italy via Dresden, where she stayed with F. Stepun for several weeks. According to F. Stepun's letter of January 8, 1934, her correspondence with O. Schor had been interrupted for several previous years. The correspondence published in 2012 shows that Olga Schor owed her relatively painless move to Italy and obtaining (and permanently renewing) a residence permit to Olga Resnevich-Senorelli (1883–1973), a Latvian citizen and prominent figure in Russian emigration. Senorelli met Vyacheslav Ivanov in the fall of 1924, felt great piety for him, and helped him in every possible way to adapt to the intellectual circles of Rome.

In Rome, Olga Alexandrovna Schor became close to the entire Ivanov family, where she lived until her death. She studied the art of Michelangelo and Leon Battista Alberti, worked on the treatise Mnemology, which remained unfinished and unpublished during her lifetime. In February 1929, O. Schor tried to get to Sorrento to see Gorky, to plead with the Soviet government for a pension and the possibility of publications to Vyacheslav Ivanovich. She traveled in the company of the Samoilovich —polar explorer—, Chukhnovsky —the pilot—, and Srednevsky – the doctor of the icebreaker Krassin. In 1931-1934 O. Schor served as the secretary of the Higher Institute of Finance in Pavia (Ivanov worked at the same time at the Collegio Borromeo — an elite educational institution in the same city). In 1934, O. Schor actively participated in the publication of a special issue of the Milanese magazine Il Convegno, entirely dedicated to V. I. Ivanov. In this issue, an extensive article by F. Stepun was published. In Russian translation it was published two years later in the Paris Sovremennye zapiski and then included in his memoirs Encounters. Continued friendship with O. Senorelli, conducted on equal terms (on the contrary, Olga Senorelli kept a respectful distance from Vyacheslav Ivanov, although he himself became more and more irritated with time). The two women shared an interest in medicine, art and anthroposophical practices: despite her Orthodoxy, Olga Alexandrovna led meditation sessions. In the early 1930s, Signorelli was working on a book about the actress Eleonora Duse, for whom Olga Schor searched for literature in various languages and consulted on various artistic and scientific innovations. It was Olga Alexandrovna who introduced her namesake to the publisher Herbert Steiner and tried to get the book published in the magazine Corona.

In her memoirs, Lidia Ivanova repeatedly emphasized the nomadic life and the restlessness of the entire Ivanov family until the mid-1930s. The scandal of the expulsion of Italian subjects from the USSR in 1932 increased the pressure of Mussolini's authorities on the emigrants who still retained Soviet citizenship. This was an important reason for the Ivanov family's conversion to Italian citizenship. Finally, without a permanent job, Ivanov decided to rent an apartment and live at home in a family style. Lydia Vyacheslavovna and Olga Schor managed to find a modest apartment on Monte Tarpeo Street at the top of Capitol Hill. It became known jokingly as Tarpeian Rock. The house belonged to the elderly Marquis Guglielmi; it turned out that Eleanor Duse had once lived in the house, from which the Ivanovs inherited the furniture. Since March 1934 Vyacheslav Ivanov found a separate house. It was here that Dmitry Merezhkovsky and Zinaida Gippius visited in August 1937; the latter described the poet's apartment in the magazine Illustrated Russia (January 1, 1938) and, without the author's knowledge, published the poem The garden, and behind it // Your naked relics, Rome! In the material support of the Ivanovs, a huge role was played by O. Signorelli, who helped Lydia Ivanova to get a job at the Conservatory to Respighi, obtained an award for her, treated all members of the family, and so on. Vyacheslav Ivanovich became her granddaughter's godfather. Apparently, Olga Signorelli repeatedly provided O. Schor with money, and on the occasion of Ivanov's report in Sanremo in March 1933, she even borrowed a dress for a gala banquet.

The house was kept almost exclusively by Olga Alexandrovna Schor, who also accompanied Ivanov to and from his work at the Collegium Russicum; Lydia Ivanova cooked, and the house was cleaned by a servant girl, Katerina. Olga Schor never took Italian citizenship, although it caused many difficulties. The family customs of the Ivanovs can be judged from the memoirs of L. V. and D. V. Ivanov, as well as from the correspondence of V. I. Ivanov with O. A. Schor. In the life of all of them was strongly artistic, playful beginning, up to the fact that they used a special language. Their nicknames were also characteristic: Olga Schor immediately became Flamingo (she had a habit of standing on one leg for a long time after thinking about it).

The head of the family in nicknames acted as the sacred cat of Egypt, priest and initiate – Professor von Poof, Lydia Ivanova – Licat (Lydia Koshka (cat), — in the masculine gender). The "cat" nickname was freely used and assigned to Ivanova by Rudolf Steiner during their interactions. Olga Schor was given another pseudonym — Deschartes. Its origin was described by L. Ivanova as follows: when Olga Alexandrovna prepared the preface to the Italian edition of Correspondence from Two Corners, she could not sign it with her real surname — her relatives remained in the USSR. So we turned to her long-standing fascination with Ancient Egypt and her family nickname; the word "flamingo" in the Egyptian language was written with five consonants DSHRT. So this word was used as a pseudonym by O. Schor throughout her life. The pseudonym Deschartes also referred to Descartes, so Olga Alexandrovna was also called Father Cartesius or O. de Cartusova in the family. Flamingo as the name of O. Schor was also taken by the Italians in correspondence with her, although in Italian this word sounded fenicottero.

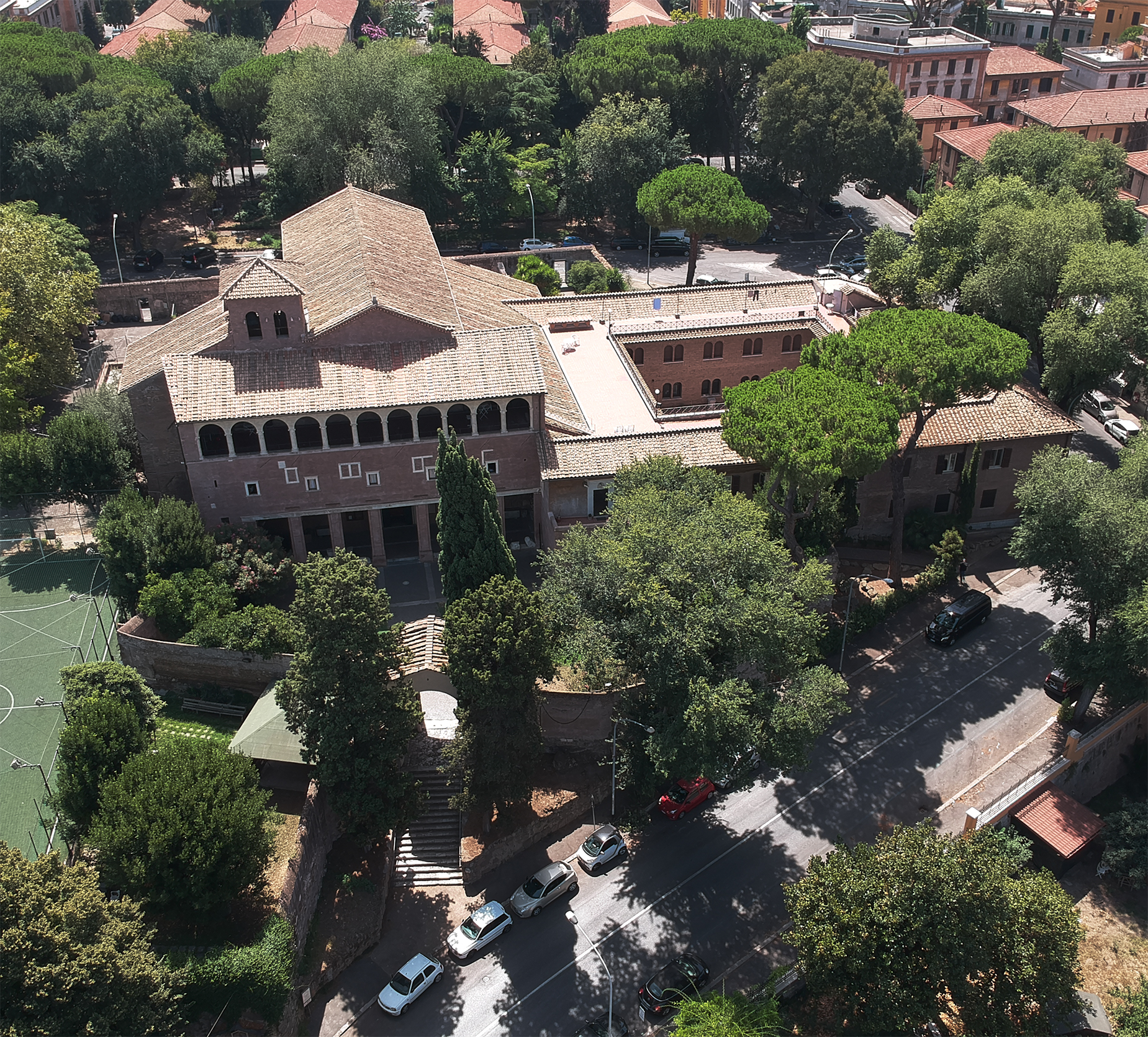
San Saba Cathedral and the surrounding neighborhood from a bird's-eye view

After the outbreak of the World War II, Monte Tarpeo Street was demolished as part of Mussolini's plan to rebuild Rome and give the Capitol a Renaissance appearance. They were given three months to relocate, and in January 1940 they found an apartment on the Aventine, in Via Leon Battista Alberti, building 5 (later 25). Tatiana Lvovna Sukhotina-Tolstaya, who lived nearby, helped to find it. The furnishings were left over from Monte Tarpeo, donated by the Marquises of Guglielmi: they too were to be moved. Ivanov became a parishioner of the church of San Saba, one of the oldest in Rome, next to the Baths of Caracalla, and from the windows of his office he could see the dome of St. Peter's. Formally, he was registered in the parish of St. Anthony in Esquilina, in the Russicum, but due to progressive phlebitis he could no longer go there and defend the full service in the Eastern Rite. Lydia Ivanova took a job in San Saba as an organist. Life during the war was hard: it was especially difficult to get food from speculators — an inveterate smoker Ivanov needed tobacco, as well as meat (on the issue of meat eating, he repeatedly argued with Sukhotina-Tolstoy —daughter of the Count— vegetarian). It came to the point that in the days of the occupation of Rome by German troops, Dmitri, who had managed to come from France, Lydia and the maid Helen (who lived at the Ivanovs in the kitchen) tried to rob a train with food standing on the spare tracks in Ostia. They managed to carry off two sacks of flour, a sack of rice and a box of tinned meat under fire. After 1945, Ivanov maintained the highest level of intellectual and artistic activity, although he left the house less and less often. According to L. Ivanova's recollections, Olga Schor "did not want to waste the precious hours when Vyacheslav could work".

=== After Vyacheslav Ivanov's death ===
After Vyacheslav Ivanov's death in 1949, Olga Schor continued to work on collecting and promoting his legacy. Between 1954 and 1957, she published in English and French in the Oxford Slavonic Papers a bibliography of Ivanov's major works, a biographical sketch, and commentaries on selected poems of recent years. In 1962, she published the poet's last volume of poetry, The Light of Evening, in Russian, in the Oxford Clarendon Press. In the sixties Olga Deshart collaborated with Roman Gul and the New York New Journal, but the project of a six-volume collection of works of V. I. Ivanov was started in Brewery. Ivanov in Brussels in 1969, O. Schor determined the plan of the publication and its composition. Despite her serious illness Olga Alexandrovna remained active until her last days, she was very interested in world events, she was shocked by the kidnapping and murder of Prime Minister Aldo Moro. After her death, she was buried in the Testaccio cemetery near Countess Tolstoy, then D. V. Ivanov transferred her ashes to the common grave of the Ivanov-Zinoviev family.

Vyacheslav Ivanov's son Dmitri dedicated a long obituary to O. Schor; the text, printed in the New York New Journal, was later included in a revised form in the third volume of Ivanov's Brussels collection (and the last one edited by Olga Alexandrovna; four volumes were published in all). Dmitri Vyacheslav emphasized the "spiritual consonance" of Vyacheslav and Olga, for whom art and philosophy were equally necessary stepping stones to knowledge. Archpriest K. Photiev in his obituary called page 227 Introduction to Ivanov's collected works "the best and most complete work of all that has been written about Vyacheslav Ivanov, ... a profound study of Russian spiritual culture at the end of the last and the first half of our century". According to the editor and publisher of the correspondence of O. Schor, V. Ivanov and O. Seniorelli, Ksenia Kumpan, for many years the main source on the life and work of Olga Alexandrovna remained the memories of Vyacheslav Ivanov's children, in which the image of her "strange double" was "lovingly reduced": "lovingly reduced" in the memories of Lydia and "lovingly exalted" by Dmitry. According to the newly discovered data, this image needs to be deciphered, since the joint efforts of all the Ivanovs created a domestic myth about the "stupid and foolish and at the same time 'learned' bird 'flamingo'", which was reproduced, including in correspondence.

== Intellectual collaboration between Olga Schor and Vyacheslav Ivanov ==
=== Correspondence from Two Corners ===
Olga Schor worked for many years on the preface to the Italian edition of Vyacheslav Ivanov and M. Gershenzon's philosophical treatise Correspondence from Two Corners, written in Moscow in the early 1920s. In Lydia Ivanova's memoirs, the history of this publication is presented in a humorous way. A verbal agreement between Ivanov and O. Resnevich-Seniorelli on the translation seems to have been reached around 1928. The reason for the beginning of this work was obvious: in 1926 a German translation of the treatise was published, which caused a certain resonance in the European philosophical community. O. Signorelli already had experience in translating the Russian philosopher of religion: it was she who produced the Italian version of N. A. Berdyaev's article The Soul of Russia, which made him famous in Italy. Olga Schor, who had known Gershenzon for a long time, supported her friend and patron in every possible way. A letter from Resnevich-Seniorelli to Olga Schor (17 August 1928) expressed the hope that the book would be published by the end of September; in fact, it was not until 1932 that it appeared. The original plan was frustrated by the indifference of Ivanov, who took a long time to proofread. In February 1929, O. Seniorelli urged Vyacheslav Ivanovich to complete the "revision" of the translation, expecting to conclude a contract with the Carabba publishing house "so that the book would be published at the latest in May" of the same year. The contract was never signed, however, because Ivanov sent the manuscript on 3 March, on the pretext that he was busy teaching. In his correspondence with Olga Schor, the poet expressed his dissatisfaction, claiming that these difficulties "distracted" him. Olga Alexandrovna herself was convinced of the quality of the translation, "perfect in its way and place".

In a letter dated 31 August 1928, O. Signorelli suggested that Olga Schor "prepare a short introduction, at least in a few words". According to the correspondence that followed, Olga Alexandrovna did not immediately decide to accept the proposal. On 17 February 1929, she asked Vyacheslav Ivanov to tell her about himself and M. Gershenzon "what you think is necessary and possible to tell the Italian public". She called her own inability to talk about the views of Mikhail Osipovich, whom she had known for a long time, "wildness". Ivanov did not reply, and Olga Schor then undertook to personally reconstruct her world view and creative biography. In subsequent correspondence, the preface is referred to as "articulus", "articuletto" or "articuletto". It seems impossible to trace the moment when a brief biographical note became a fundamental study. Judging by the fragments that have survived, the early version differed greatly from the published one: for example, Olga Schor wrote extensively about the role of L. D. Zinovieva-Annibal in the poet's formation. Vyacheslav Ivanovich described the written work as "a broadly conceived and philosophically constructive work", but doubting Senorelli's ability to translate it adequately, he began to correct and shorten the text, for which he received thanks in a letter dated 6 May 1929. Seniorelli noted that the "articulos" were "more difficult" than the correspondence between Gershenzon and Ivanov, "more esoteric", and based on almost untranslatable quotations from Ivanov's early articles. According to the researcher Ksenia Kumpan, "Ivanov did not trust not only the translator but, it seems, the interpreter of his work", and in a letter of 8 May he directly regretted that Olga Alexandrovna had taken on a work she could not cope with. The same idea was repeated in a letter of 29 June: "in this long and complicated work you will still not say the most important thing 'due to circumstances beyond your control'...". The work was interrupted in July 1929 when Olga Schor went to Paris to look after her sick cousin, but she took the manuscript with her and reported from the French capital on 1 August that "the articulos have become unrecognisable". However, she was immediately self-critical, stating that the text was "irritatingly helpless and colourless". This version raised the question of the philosopher Ivanov's movement from Dionysianism to Christ and the Church. In a reply dated 12 August, Vyacheslav Ivanovich even toyed with the idea of personally translating Olga Schor's article to Italian.

In her September correspondence with O. Signorelli, Schor complained that Ivanov was 'terribly difficult and elusive', which delayed the completion of his biography until November. Ivanov himself sarcastically compared himself to a 'bottomless vessel' and Olga to 'one of the Danaids'. It was not until 3 December, that he received the four chapters devoted to himself. On 11 February 1930, in their correspondence, it was noted that O. A. Schor had decided to completely revise the entire plan of the publication. О. Signorelli insisted that the preface should not exceed 30 pages to maintain the proportion between the introduction and the main text. Olga Alexandrovna responded by suggesting, on behalf of Ivanov, that the book should include the article Kruchi and also Gershenzon's Sun Over the Darkness. Then it was possible to write a ten-page preface and, as an appendix in small print, a long article by Schor "on the thoughts and fates of both authors". The Italian publisher did not agree to this plan and rushed the translator and the author of the preface to publish a religious-philosophical treatise before Easter (20 April). Olga Schor had to admit to writing a new, lighter text ("to clarify the 'letters'..."), but it was not ready before Easter. Seniorelli left to visit her daughter in Latvia, and in May Ivanov urged Schor to "work well". In August Olga Schor wrote the last pages of her essay directly in Italian. It was not until 23 August that Ivanov sent a draft with his corrections; after an urgent re-whitening, the manuscript was sent to O. Signorelli on 27 August 1930. According to the correspondence between Olga Schor and Vyacheslav Ivanov, he disapproved of the "articuletto", especially the part devoted to his own views, calling it "inarticulate". At the last stage he excluded the last fragment, which compared the two philosophical systems of the correspondents "from two angles". Ivanov rewrote the fragment on time and space, which is recognisable in the published version by its complicated stylistics and "quotational language".

In the published version, the introduction by Olga Schor (under the pseudonym O. Deschartes) ran to 63 small-format pages, divided into an introduction on the history of the correspondence itself and two chapters of equal length on Ivanov and Gershenzon. The chapters are organised in the same way, beginning with a statement of worldview and "spiritual path" and ending with a biographical paragraph. The manuscript was submitted to the Karabba publishing house on 7 September 1930, but in November printing was postponed until February 1931. During this time a French translation was published, for which the text of Correspondence... was substantially edited by Vyacheslav Ivanov, who wrote an epilogue describing the development of his spiritual life. The book was not published until the winter of 1931, and a new proof-reading, taking into account the French revision, was sent to the publisher on 8 September. Giuseppe Carabba, the owner of the publishing house, was literally furious that he had received a new text under the guise of a proofreading and demanded payment for a new typesetting. As a result, two new proofs were required in November and December. Further delays followed in 1932, and it was not until 25 June that the Italian edition of Correspondence from Two Corners was printed.

Olga Schor's biographical essays on Vyacheslav Ivanov and M. Gershenzon were the first publications on these thinkers in Italian. Her so-called "short biography" (Cenni biografici) of Ivanov was published in a special issue of "Il Convegno. Rivista di letteratura e di arte" (1934, no. 8-12, pp. 384–408) and became the basis for an extensive biography of Vyacheslav Ivanovich, published in 1971 as an introduction to his collected works. Ivanov himself, at the end of his life, recognised that his life, worldview and creativity "in their development" were "fully and penetratingly shown" by Olga Alexandrovna.

=== The Tale of Tsarevich Svetomir ===
According to the testimony of O. Schor, Vyacheslav Ivanov began to write the text of The Tale of Tsarevich Svetomir in Rome on the night of 27–28 September 1928. The first song was finished in the autumn of the same year, in its original version it contained texts that were later incorporated into the next song; the poet worked on the second part (the third song of the published version) in Pavia, finishing it on 16 June 1929. The first chapters of the third song were composed in Pavia between 1930 and 1932. After moving to Rome in 1934, V. I. Ivanov continued to work on chapters 11–17 of the Third Song, returning to them periodically until 1939. He was greatly stimulated by his work at the Pontifical Oriental Institute, for which he reread sacred texts and immersed himself in Church Slavonic studies. It was not until January 1945 that the third song of the story was completed. The notes on the autographs of the fourth song indicate that work on it was carried out from February to December 1945. According to the testimony of O. Schor and the poet's daughter L. V. Ivanova, Vyacheslav Ivanovich continued working on the story literally until his death.

On 25 August 1930, Olga Alexandrovna Schor sent Ivanov a postcard in which she reported that Svetomir was "haunting" her and that he had finally mystically "revealed" to her the story of his life. The poet's reply, dated 29 August, shows that Vyacheslav Ivanov had no clear plan for the continuation of his work at that time. A. L. Toporkov drew attention to two problems in this connection: first, O. A. Schor thought it possible to compose the plot of the story for Ivanov; second, it is quite possible that the continuation and was embodied in their own version of Adolescence of Svetomir. Information about the continuation of the story is rather contradictory. For example, in a letter to the translator B. von Geiserel from the same year, 1930, V. Ivanov speaks of 9 books, while O. Schor, in her notes to the 1971 edition, speaks of 12. The discrepancies can be explained by the fact that the creative plans may have changed considerably over time. At the same time, the "continuation" written by O. Schor contained four books, i.e. in the end the structure of the Tale returned to the nine-part structure mentioned in the letter to von Geiserel.

In V. I. Ivanov's archive in Rome, separate notes, sketches and plans relating to the unrealised songs have been preserved. One of the plans contains motifs used by O. Schor in her sixth book. S. K. Makovsky, after his interaction with O. Schor, also gave a detailed account of the author's intentions. According to him, the Tale was to consist of two large parts of approximately equal length, of which the first was about three-quarters finished. Makovsky did not know about V. Ivanov's manuscript projects and prospectuses, but he mentioned that O. Schor had written down the poet's ideas. There was no mention of a will to complete the story or of O. Schor's own plans for it. In the retelling of the story by S. Makovsky there is no clear indication of Svetomir's stay at the court of John the Presbyter and in the realm of the dead. However, the plots of the golden arrow, the crystal coffin and the life in the monastery correspond to the plots used by O. Schor. The "continuation" of Olga Alexandrovna ends with the tsarina waking Svetomir from his sleep. Rising from his crystal coffin, he discovers a golden arrow in his hands and orders it to carry him to his homeland. In his homeland, he meets the Apostle John and St Egorius, who bless him and give him a white horse. This differs from S. K. Makovsky's version, in which the Tsar-Devitsa is the transformed Svetomir after the Resurrection – the ruler of the renewed earth.

Olga Alexandrovna had mystical moods: a letter of 25 January 1929 describes a vision of L. D. Zinovieva-Annibal who visited her, the feeling of "a sensual connection with the departed", but at the same time O. Schor "painfully could not remember what she said". Yuri Ivask recounted one of Olga Schor's memories from the time of Berdyaev's Academy: during a furious argument between I. A. Ilyin and P. A. Florensky, when Father Paul was "humbly listening", a small pink ball flew out of his mouth and entered Ilyin's: "It blocked his mouth, but painlessly!" While working on Svetomir, O. Schor claimed that she was fulfilling V. Ivanov's dying wish. Moreover, V. I. Ivanov and O. A. Schor sincerely believed, that their spiritual connection would not be broken after their physical death and that the poet could "dictate" from the other side of the world. D. V. Ivanov, the poet's son, wrote about the same: in O. Schor's letter to him, dated 26 August 1967, he describes one of these visions. However, it is quite possible that Ivanov's command to save Svetomir correlates with what Ludwig Tieck did for Novalis's novel Heinrich von Oftendingen, that is, to publish the text with a statement of the author's intention to save it for posterity[58]. The materials mentioned by O. Schor in her biography, the preface to the Brussels Collected Works, have not yet been found, but in 2023 the O. A. Schor archive, also kept at the V. Ivanov Research Centre in Rome, was still being processed.

== Aesthetic and philosophical views ==
External image
- | Caricature of S. Ivanov: V. Ivanov – a scientist cat – writes with a pen: “A is a man, not a cat". Author's signature in the bottom

=== Mnemology ===
Despite studying in Freiburg and joining the circle of neo-Kantians, this philosophy remained alien to O. Schor. According to D. Ivanov, Plato, Saint Augustine and Michelangelo have always remained central figures in world culture. Even in her youth she began to develop her own system of thought, which she called Mnemology — the doctrine of memory as the basis of being. Olga Schor based her ideas on Augustine's thesis, which affirmed memory as the noblest of human faculties. According to her, it is memory that certifies the basis of being. For Schor, it is memory that certifies being and affirms the identity of the soul with itself, making the principle of identity the beginning of life. Memory is not only a faculty of the soul and a manifestation of the action of the life-giving Spirit. In 2023, the unfinished manuscript of Mnemology saw the light of day. It turned out to be a treatise on the theology of memory, and was formed in the spirit of the mathematising theology of Father Pavel Florensky. O. Schor's argumentation was based on Vyach. Ivanov's mythological interpretation of the behaviour of Dostoevsky's characters – the assumption that Satan has two hypostases: Lucifer and Ahriman. Lucifer, who opposes God, is rational, he "rebels for the sake of something", endowed with purposefulness. Ahriman is an aimless vigilante who shows a total corruption of morality and intelligence. Olga Schor went much further, analysing the phenomenology of the event with reference to Rickert and Husserl, proving the irreducibility of the event even to the most perfect forms of being. World history consists of events in heaven and on earth, but causal relations apply only to earthly existence. True reality, as it were, decomposes in itself into empirical reality, and only the overthrow, the disintegration, gives birth to Being out of the event. Myth, manifested in metonymy and music, and ritual, represented by metaphor and mask, return human consciousness to synthetic judgement, becoming a synthetic creation untouched by decay. This is how the transition to the problem of memory is made: Ahriman invokes and teaches oblivion, and only the archangel Michael, with his openness and triumphalism, can defeat him. Lucifer conceals forgetting and is opposed and defeated by the archangel Gabriel, who announces the hidden and shameful memory of humanity on the day of the Annunciation. Olga Schor also turned to mythology in her completed The Tale of Tsarevich Svetomir, in which the fight against the serpent is presented as a basic myth of the whole culture. The thinker sought to interpret the "synthetic judgement" in her modern logic as "eidetic", as the contemplation of ideas — eidos, bringing Husserl and Plato closer together in their desire to return to the true way of thinking and spiritual contemplation.

According to O. Fetisenko, in the pages of her Mnemology O. Schor argued with all the authorities of European science, starting with Aristotle. When exactly the idea of the treatise was conceived, it is impossible to establish, but there was a version that it was the main work of Olga Alexandrovna's life, nurtured since the time of her studies in Freiburg. In one of the manuscripts there is the date 28 February 1930 on the title page, which should be understood as the beginning of the design of this version. Although the work is "decorated" as a scientific treatise, with a division into paragraphs and the inclusion of algebraic formulae, it constantly shifts to the genre of the intimate essay, in which the author uses the language of poetry instead of philosophical argumentation, quoting a wide range of authors from Tyutchev to Vyacheslav Ivanov. The most complete manuscript consists of seven chapters (the sixth is missing). In 1933, Olga Alexandrovna abandoned this version and began work on a condensed edition, which she abandoned at the second chapter, which remained in draft form with notes for herself. In 1929–1930, while working on the commentary and preface to the Italian edition of V. Ivanov and M. Gershenzon's Correspondence from Two Corners, O. Schor made extensive use of the concepts and terminology of her Mnemology. In a correspondence with Vyacheslav Ivanovich dated 30 April 1929, Olga Alexandrovna insisted on her right to conceptual disagreement, beliefs being something "that should be discussed, not corrected". V. Ivanov himself, in poetic works addressed to O. Schor, called her a "co-questioner", using the mnemological term apanthema ("meeting", "coincidence"), formed contrary to the rules of the Greek language. O. Schor had a misunderstanding with F. Stepun in 1934 over Ivanov's work, specifically the melopoem Man, published before the revolution. This voluminous poem had been partially published in 1916, but Stepun was not familiar with its text; the complete edition was published in Paris only in 1939. To prepare an article on Ivanov for an Italian magazine, the philosopher received the full text, which she had transcribed by hand, from O. Schor. Fyodor Augustovich did not realise that the date "1928" referred to the manuscript and not to the poem itself, and formed a false idea about Ivanov's growth as a poet, considering the Man as proof of his "continuous poetic ascence".

=== General statements of her philosophical and aesthetic views ===
A preliminary overview of O.A. Schor's philosophical and aesthetic concept was given by the art historian I. D. Chechot. In the preface to the publication of the essay on Michelangelo, he noted that Olga Schor's methodological guidelines were peculiar: "She was not looking for an occasion for self-expression, she was not creating a new view or interpretation. Her aim was to find the 'correct' view of Michelangelo's life and work, but 'correctness' was understood as a situation that depends on time, place, language and audience. Olga Schor strove for a statement that would do justice to the essence of the subject, i.e. she saw the cognition of art as "an act of service to that essence itself". I. Chechot saw in this attitude "a peculiar shade of ritual and sacrifice". O. Schor's cognitive ideal consisted in contemplation and holistic (not disintegrated into parts) experience and empathy with the problems of the Creator. She called love the means of cognition-understanding of the artist, interpreting this concept as "sharing with the object of contemplation its destiny and problems". According to O. Schor, knowledge is not identical with interpretation, since "one can interpret without contemplating anything". Love in the Neoplatonic spirit is interpreted as "contemplation-understanding that celebrates its object" and at the same time as exaltation. The art historian acts as an "adorer" (from the Latin adorer "to adore" and at the same time "to question"). Love serves as a mediator between "the wise and the ignorant", offering to open oneself to things and events in order to know and understand them. Understanding is interpreted as "birth in beauty", including sublimation, the purification of the understood from the accidental.

Olga Schor consistently adhered to the classical interpretation of art. Her models were Praxiteles, Raphael, Mozart, Goethe and Pushkin. Their works (as well as those of Vyacheslav Ivanov), in O. Schor's perception, embodied the casualness, lightness and, at the same time, "thing completeness" of art. Unlike thought, art lacks "viscous continuity", is sudden, requires "mental pause in its acquiring and creating activity". Accordingly, she valued transparency and clarity in art, even a certain impassivity. Creativity is recognised as inexplicable because it embodies "the antinomy of ultimate freedom and ultimate obedience". Obedience is expressed in the problem of order, because the order that is fruitful for the artist is "complicity in creation": examples are Pericles and the Parthenon, Justinian and Aya Sofia, Augustus and the Aeneid, Julius II and the Sistine Chapel. In Russia, the "clever client" was Pushkin, who gave Gogol the idea for Dead Souls. Even the most "enchanting" commission is never carried out according to the plan of the client, who ideally recognises and even demands independence and assertiveness from the artist, expecting "surprise and amazement" from the result. Michelangelo, as the main object of Olga Alexandrovna's study, was a deeply contradictory artist, because he was prophetic about being and events. Being "speaks through events", "to see being is to foresee an event". Nevertheless, according to O. Schor, the artist narrates the event, while the prophet foretells it, i.e. the artist acts as a guardian and the prophet as a "transgressor". According to I. Chechot's interpretation, this should be understood in the sense that Michelangelo always linked his creations to the projective moment, to the representation of the future. His Creation of Adam or Expulsion from Paradise are not perceived "historically", even his Last Judgement is "not yet a point": they express providence and foreboding, tension before an unknown release.

In the 1930s, O. Schor worked in Rome as a tourist guide to earn money. In the memoirs of B. Filippov, her manner implied not only scientific erudition, but also "artistic brightness": "...no Vasari, no Pictures of Italy by the talented Muratov, no anecdotes of Bocaccio about the artists and mosaicists of the Trecento do not penetrate into the soul of the Great Rome as these quiet stories of Olga Alexandrovna Schor".

=== Antimodernism, Titanism and Tragedy ===
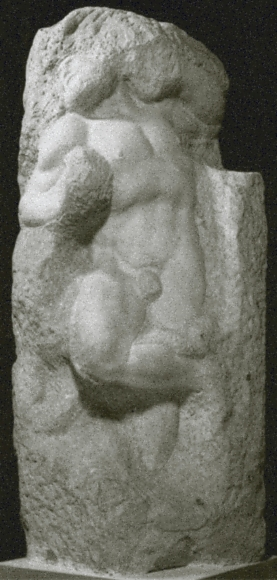
Michelangelo. The Awakening Slave. Galleria dell'Accademia, Florence

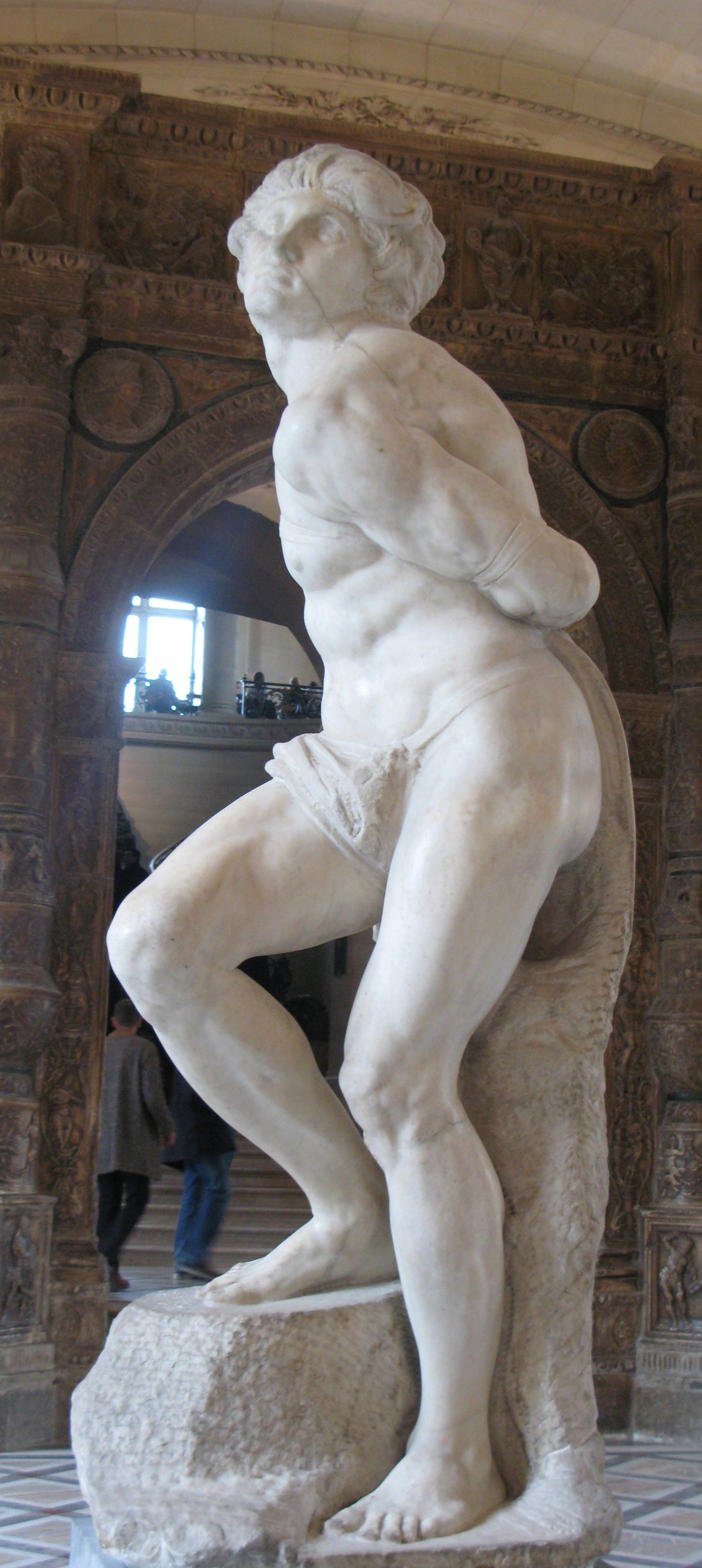
Michelangelo. The Rising Slave. Louvre

I. Chechota reconstructed Olga Schor's aesthetics and philosophical views basing on her Essay on Michelangelo. Generalising, the art historian noted that points of view such as O. A. Schor's are "unnecessary" because they "lack the dynamism that today one is accustomed to deriving only from criticism and deconstruction". "Both Shor and her Michelangelo are directed towards the eternal and the indestructible, the immovable". Olga Schor's anti-modernism (like Vyacheslav Ivanov's) manifested itself in the denial of the social efficacy of art: it cannot stimulate social uplift, and the social exploitation of art always leads to misunderstandings. Olga Schor saw Michelangelo's work as "a myth of unknown destiny and incessant anxiety", which she did not clarify, but only hinted at. At the same time, she explicitly stated that both philosophy and art "move deliberately towards the banal", a statement that I. Chechot called "scandalous" in the current context of the twenty-first century. Michelangelo, according to O. Schor, was on the verge of creating a "profane myth", understandable to the masses, accepted by the people, but accepted only by the elites, and in different ways.

According to I. Chechot, in the 1910s, when O. Schor was being formed as a thinker, the search for an individual and monumental style was topical in Western and Russian aesthetics. The creation of truly monumental art was attributed to non-individualistic cultural types, such as ancient Egyptian or Antique art. Olga Schor interpreted monumentality as a sign of the solitude of the spirit, its autarky, because in the monumental the spirit builds itself according to its own internal law. Complete autarky is tragic because it inevitably leads to a collision with the absolute. Looking at Michelangelo's sculptures, Olga Schor postulated graphicity, the linearity of form, stating that "in the shadows there is a breakthrough into the otherworldly space" against which the appearance of volumetric forms takes place. Speaking of the solitude of Michelangelo's genius, O. Schor introduced the concept of anti-eroticism, meaning that eros is always personal, concrete, confessional. She argued that Michelangelo is not a portraitist, so his bodies are devoid of individuality, the sculptor is "unloving" in detail. O. Schor meant, first of all, that Michelangelo did not confuse the sphere of perfection with self-expression. Moreover, in her understanding, Michelangelo, conquering nature through art (this was a common task for Renaissance artists), strove to "reveal his subject's solitude" (solitude is the weakening of the connection with the whole and with the source). Olga Schor did not mention Michelangelo's Neoplatonism, arguing that he did not work with "energy", but with the plane, stone and nature. Vyacheslav Ivanov cut from the manuscript a passage about the longing of nature, which is "a look and a message, but not expressed to the end"; that is, Michelangelo "draws" the message to the surface and "translates —voices— intones it in the language of bodies, in the language of poses, gestures and facial expressions". Olga Schor saw Michelangelo as a prophet obsessed with the idea of artistry. This idea, in the spirit of Platonism and Neoplatonism, is detached from everything empirical and private: painting is projected onto an ideal plane, sculpture into an ideal space, painting does not end where the canvas is stretched, sculpture is not limited to the space where the marble ends. The ideal space is interpreted as immaterial, which can and must be seen, but cannot be touched or measured. Michelangelo's greatness manifested itself in his ability to penetrate the depths of creation, "where his gaze meets the gaze of the Creator": the monumentality of his marbles and huge frescoes is an attempt to "bring out" God's message through means accessible to human perception.

Olga Schor could not ignore a characteristic feature of Michelangelo's work, namely the non-finito. For her, it was an expression of the continuity of the noetic act: for Buonarroti, creativity was an ideomotor movement, thinking meant doing, and nothing could stop the continuity of thinking. Olga Alexandrovna came to the conclusion of the constant presence of thought, which does not need adaptation or "fuller manifestation". That is why Michelangelo did not want to end his works, did not want to separate them, because it is impossible to separate thought. Both thought and matter are part of a holistic flow in which neither the part nor the whole can be represented in pure form, for they are manifested in the unity of a systemic whole. Nor can thought be either private or discontinuous. Michelangelo's non-finito means that the sculptor and artist perceived the world as wholeness and art as detachment, and the world itself appeared in his mind as a single detached work of art. The concept of "detachment" probably comes from the texts of Meister Eckhart (Abgeschlossenheit). According to I. Chechot, one can find parallels with Heidegger, whose speech on detachment was delivered in 1955. Vyacheslav Ivanov had two books by Heidegger in his library (Über den Humanismus, 1949, and Was ist Metaphysik?, 1930). In the treatment of shadows as a breakthrough into the abyss, the emphasis on detachment, loneliness and tragedy, even linguistic moments (the concept of "circumstances of the world") "allow us to suspect, if not influence, then consonance with Heidegger".

Olga Schor categorically stated that artistic consciousness is always monological in its essence, in which it is opposed to the prophet's dialogical consciousness. I. Chechot noted that during O. Schor's lifetime dialogical consciousness was the "password" of the Bakhtin school, revealing the social nature and essence of art. In this context, Olga Schor fully internalised the views of Ivanov, for whom art is "neither speech, nor conversation, nor appeal, nor sermon, nor message". According to Olga Schor's own formula, "the poet responds to everything... but somehow impassively", while the prophet "always responds passionately", but "not to everything". Michelangelo's legacy is thus the clearest expression of the problem of combining professionalism and artistry. This is the root of the tragedy. Michelangelo, according to V. Ivanov and O. Schor-Deschartes, is a titan, a rival of the gods, reminiscent of Prometheus. However, in the system built by Olga Alexandrovna, Michelangelo is a self-denying titan, because his goal was to "represent the divine creation with semi-divine perfection". O. Schor-Deschartes's attitude to titanism is evident in her commentary on Ivan's tragedy Tantalus, and in the preface to her collected works: tragedy requires passions and events set by the feminine. Masculinity elevated to heroism does not produce tragedy without being impregnated by "feminine orgasm". It is impossible to judge the extent to which the feminine beginning was present in Michelangelo's fate, but his love of the body (sometimes interpreted as homoerotic) can also reach a tragic self-denial. In O. Schor's interpretation, the focus of Michelangelo's work is not a "solitary and powerful figure", not a phallic form, not a "sculpture-pillar" or a "building-crystal", but always an ensemble, at least a binary group, a multitude of figures. For Michelangelo, there was no Dionysian beginning; he is without love and is not an agent of orgasm, instead of which his art presents "the peace of solitude, the cult of detachment, the Egyptian shadows".

== Bibliography ==
=== Sources ===
- Deschartes, O. (1932a). Venceslao Ivanov // Ivanov V., Gherscenzon M.O. Corrispondenza da un angolo all'altrо [Vyacheslav Ivanov // Ivanov V., Gherscenzon M.O. Correspondence from corner to corner / Translation from Russian by Olga Resnevic] (in Italian). Lanciano: Casa Editrice Rocco Carabba. pp. 13–37.
- Deschartes, O. (1932b). Venceslao Ivanov // Ivanov V., Gherscenzon M.O. Corrispondenza da un angolo all'altrо [Vyacheslav Ivanov // Ivanov V., Gherscenzon M.O. Correspondence from corner to corner / Translation from Russian by Olga Resnevic] (in Italian). Lanciano: Casa Editrice Rocco Carabba. pp. 39–63.
- Deschartes, O. A. (1971). "Введение". Иванов Вяч. Собрание сочинений / Под ред. Д. В. Иванова и О. Дешарт; с введ. и примеч. О. Дешарт [Ivanov Vyach. Collected Works] (in Russian). Vol. 1. Брюссель: Foyer Oriental Chrétien. pp. 7–227.
- Переписка В. И. Иванова и О. А. Шор (Публ. А. Кондюриной, Л. Ивановой, Д. Рицци, А. Шишкина) // Archivio italo-russo III = Русско-итальянский архив III: Vjačeslav Ivanov — Testi inediti / a cura di Daniela Rizzi e Andrei Shishkin [Correspondence of V. I. Ivanov and O. A. Shor (PUBLISHED by A. Kondurina, L. Ivanova, D. Rizzi, A. Shishkin)]. Collana di Europa orientalis (in Russian). Salerno: Convivium. 2001. pp. 151–454. ISSN 0392-4580.
- Письмо О. Шор к Ф. Степуну 1963 г. / публ. Н. Рудник и Д. Сегала [O. Schor's letter to F. Stepun, 1963.] (in Russian). Зеркало (Иерусалим). 2001. pp. 141–170.
- Schor, Olga (2011). Микель-Анджело (Публикация Ольги Фетисенко) // Archivio italo-russo VIII = Русско-итальянский архив VIII / Сост. Д. Рицци, А. Шишкин [Michelangelo (Published by Olga Fetisenko)] (in Russian). Салерно: Шишкин. pp. 217–278.
- Тройная переписка: Вяч. Иванов и Ольга Шор в переписке с Ольгой Ресневич-Синьорелли (1925—1948) // Archivio italo-russo IX = Русско-итальянский архив IX / предисл. и подгот. текста К. Кумпан; коммент. А. д'Амелия, К. Кумпан, Д. Рицци [A Triple Correspondence: Vyacheslav Ivanov and Olga Schor in Correspondence with Olga Resnevich-Signorelli (1925–1948)]. Dipartimento di Studi Umanistici – Università di Salerno (in Russian). Салерно: Europa Orientalis. 2012. pp. 251–425.
- Фёдор Степун — Ольга Шор: из переписки 1920–х годов / подгот. текста, примеч. А. Волкова, предисл. А. Шишкина // Wiener Slawisches Jahrbuch. Neue Folge 1 [Fyodor Stepun – Olga Shor: from correspondence of the 1920s] (in Russian). Vol. 19/1. 2013. pp. 244–275.
- Schor, O. (2017). Микель-Анджело (фрагменты) // Мир искусства: контрасты: Альманах [MikelAngelo (excerpts)] (in Russian). СПб.: Благотворительный фонд «Музыка и современность». pp. 39–47.
- Schor, O. (2023). Мнемология = Μνημολογία: Институт русской литературы (Пушкинский Дом) Российской академии наук, Centro studi e ricerca Viaʌčeslav Ivanov / Составитель, предисловие, подготовка текста и примечания О. Л. Фетисенко [Mnemology = Μνημολογία: Institute of Russian Literature (Pushkin House)] (in Russian). СПб.: Пушкинский дом. p. 237. ISBN 978-5-91476-145-2.

=== Researches and fiction ===
- Volkov A., Shishkin A. (2013). Федор Степун – Ольга Шор: из переписки 1920–х годов // Wiener Slavistisches Jahrbuch [Fyodor Stepun – Olga Schor: from correspondence of the 1920s] (in Russian). Vol. 1. pp. 244–275. JSTOR 10.13173/wienslavjahr.1.2013.0244.
- D. I. (1979). "О. А. Шор — О. Дешарт". Вячеслав Иванов. Собрание сочинений в 4 томах / под редакцией Д. В. Иванова и О. Дешарт; с введением и примечаниями О. Дешарт [Vyacheslav Ivanov. Collected Works in 4 volumes / edited by D. V. Ivanov and O. Deshart; with an introduction and notes by O. Deshart. Deshartes] (in Russian). Vol. III. Брюссель: Foyer Oriental Chrétien. pp. 688–693.
- Zobin, G. (2022). Вячеслав Иванов [Vyacheslav Ivanov]. Жизнь замечательных людей (in Russian). ВЕБКНИГА. p. 280. ISBN 978-5-235-04647-4.
- Ivanov, V. (2015). Повесть о Светомире царевиче / Изд. подготовили А. Л. Топорков, О. Л. Фетисенко, А. Б. Шишкин [The Tale of Tsarevich Svetomir]. Литературные памятники (in Russian). М.: Ладомир, Наука. p. 824. ISBN 978-5-86218-532-4.
- Ivanova, L. (1992). Воспоминания. Книга об отце [Memories. A Book About Father.] (in Russian). М.: Феникс. p. 432. ISBN 5-85042-038-X
- Незабытые могилы: российское зарубежье: некрологи 1917—1997, в 6 т. Российская гос. б-ка. Отд. лит. рус. зарубежья; сост. В. Н. Чумаков / Под ред. Е. В. Макаревич [Unforgotten Graves: the Russian Abroad: Necrologies 1917–1997, in 6 vol: Russian State Library] (in Russian). Vol. 6. М.: Пашков дом. 2007. p. 451.
- Rudnik, N.; Segal, D. (2011). «Начала и концы»: К письму О. А. Шор (О. Дешарт) Ф. А. Степуну. Звенья (3 апреля 2011) [“Beginnings and Ends”: Toward a letter by O. A. Shor (O. Deshart) to F. A. Stepun. Links (April 3, 2011).] (in Russian).
- Segal, D. (1994). "Вячеслав Иванов и семья Шор (По материалам рукописного отдела Национальной и Университетской Библиотеки в Иерусалиме)" [Vyacheslav Ivanov and the Schor Family (Based on materials from the Manuscript Department of the National and University Library in Jerusalem)]. Cahiers du Monde Russe (in Russian). 35 (1–2): 331–352. doi:10.3406/cmr.1994.2395.
- Stepun, F. A. (1991). Письмо к О. Шор (8 января 1934 г.). Публикация и комментарии Д. В. Иванова и А. Б. Шишкина [Letter to O. Schor (January 8, 1934). Publication and comments by D. V. Ivanov and A. B. Shishkin. V. Ivanov and A. B. Shishkin] (in Russian). Иванову. pp. 237–239.
- Chechot, I. (2011). Путеводная звезда трагедии: Микеланджело глазами Ольги Шор // Русско-итальянский архив VIII [The guiding star of tragedy: Michelangelo through the eyes of Olga Shor // Russian-Italian Archive VIII] (PDF) (in Russian). pp. 185–215.
- Shishkin, A. (2019). "Шор Ольга Александровна". Русское присутствие в Италии в первой половине ХХ века: Энциклопедия/ Составители и научные редакторы Антонелла д'Амелия, Даниела Рицци [Russian Presence in Italy in the First Half of the Twentieth Century: Encyclopedia] (in Russian). М.: Политическая энциклопедия. pp. 730–732. ISBN 978-5-8243-2316-0.
