= Aleksei Solonovich =

Russian anarchist

Aleksei Aleksandrovich Solonovich (Russian: Алексей Александрович Солонович; 23 October 1887 – 4 March 1937) was a Russian mathematician, philosopher, and esotericist who became the chief ideologist of the mystical anarchist movement in the Soviet Union during the 1920s and 1930s. Together with Apollon Karelin he co‑created the underground “Order of Light” (also known as the Eastern Detachment of the Templars of the World Order of Templars), and after Karelin’s death he assumed leadership of the organisation. His magnum opus, Bakunin and the Cult of Yaldabaoth, was destroyed by the OGPU after his arrest, and his work remained largely forgotten until the 1990s.

== Biography ==
=== Early life and education (1887–1914) ===
Solonovich was born into a noble family in Kazimierz, Lublin Governorate (then part of the Russian Empire). He studied physics and mathematics at Moscow State University, where he became acquainted with Gnostic literature and radical political ideas. In 1905, at the age of seventeen, he was placed under surveillance for revolutionary agitation. He took part in student riots in 1911 and was temporarily expelled from the university. In 1914 he completed his degree and spent several months as a novice at the Svyatogorsk monastery. That same year his first book, Wanderings of the Spirit (Skitaniia dukha), was published; church censors accused him of insulting religion and morality, but the court acquitted him.

=== Academic and political activity (1914–1929) ===
From 1914 to 1918 Solonovich taught mathematics in Moscow secondary schools. From 1920 to 1925 he was a privatdozent at the Moscow Higher Technical School, lecturing on mathematics. He became an active participant in the anarchist movement after 1917. Together with Apollon Karelin, he created an anarcho‑mystical organisation that by 1920 had taken shape as the “Order of Light”. Between 1919 and 1921 he took part in the “Free Commonwealth of Spiritual Currents”, where he publicly criticised both Marxism and anthroposophy. From 1921 to 1930, with the permission of Sofia Kropotkina, he held regular meetings of mystical anarchists at the Kropotkin Museum in Moscow. After Karelin’s death in 1926, Solonovich became the central figure of Russian mystical anarchism and was recognised as the “undisputed leader” of the movement. According to the testimony of D. A. Bem, Solonovich was also one of the co‑organisers of an émigré “branch” of mystical anarchism in the United States.

In 1929 the anarcho‑communist journal Delo Truda published a fierce attack on Solonovich, “The Troubadour of Mystical Anarchism”, which was later described as a political denunciation orchestrated by the OGPU.

=== Arrest, exile, and death (1930–1937) ===
Solonovich was arrested in 1930 and exiled to Siberia. During his exile he tried to maintain ties with the Moscow organisation through his wife Agnila Solonovich, but the Order was systematically destroyed during the Stalinist repressions. He was arrested again in 1937 after returning from exile, charged with counter‑revolutionary agitation and leadership of an anti‑Soviet organisation. He went on hunger strike in prison; however, because of a heart condition, the protest led to his death. He died on 4 March 1937 in Novosibirsk. His wife Agnila was shot later the same year.

== Philosophical teaching ==
=== Critique of materialism and creatio ex nihilo ===
The core of Solonovich’s philosophy is a rejection of Marxist historical materialism. In a lecture series entitled “Critique of Materialism”, he argued that matter‑atomistic conceptions cannot account for dialectical contradictions, because “one atomic combination cannot contradict another – that is nonsense”. Instead, he proposed that evolution must be understood as a coming‑into‑being of what has not existed before – a creatio ex nihilo. He described the transcendent source of all existence as “Nothingness” (Nichto), “Nonbeing” (Nebytie) and the “Unmanifested” (Neproiavlennogo), which is “ineffable”, “unfathomable” and “unknowable”. Every particle of material reality emerges spontaneously and arbitrarily – in a word, anarchically.

=== Triadic anthropology (physics, psychics, pneumatics) ===
Drawing on Gnostic anthropology, Solonovich divided humanity into three types.

- Physics (people of the flesh) are determined by corporeality, hunger, sensuality and fear of death. Their social forms are the family, the crowd and the mass.
- Psychics (people of the soul) are philosophers who rebel against the physic’s world and try to “tame” reality through institutions (science, law, the state). They correspond to Bakunin’s “thought”.
- Pneumatics (people of the spirit) have access to the “authentic Logos” through mystical experience. They overcome the anthropocentrism of the psychic and perceive both the transitory and the universal. The pneumatic’s social form is the secret alliance or “adeptate”.

For Solonovich, Bakunin himself was a pneumatic, while Marx was a psychic. Only pneumatics are capable of the “genuine great anarchy”, which is inseparable from mysticism.

=== Philosophy of culture ===
Like Danilevsky, Leontiev and Spengler, Solonovich held that every historical culture passes through three inevitable stages: myth‑making, the creation of rational abstract systems, and finally “exhaustion”, after which the culture leaves the earthly world and continues its existence elsewhere in the universe. He argued that science and philosophy are merely a “combinatorics of facts” and a “system of using” data, serving utilitarian ends rather than truth. Knowing, he wrote, is a form of domination: “To understand things means to possess them.”

=== Gnosticism, templarism and the “Order of Light” ===
Solonovich interpreted the Biblical creator as the malevolent demiurge Yaldabaoth, a false god that keeps souls trapped in the material world. Consequently, anarchism for him was not a secular ideology but a spiritual revolt against the tyrannical structure of the cosmos. In a surviving manuscript, “Christ and Christianity”, he argued that Jesus taught anarchist values, that the apostle Paul distorted primitive Christianity, and that Peter established a “satanic Church”. The “Order of Light” was understood as a continuation of the medieval Templars. Solonovich used 137 esoteric “legends” (which he probably wrote himself) to create a mythical genealogy linking the Order to Gnostic groups, the Bogomils, the Cathars, and a hidden tradition of “spiritual knights”. He called for the creation of a new anarchist knighthood that would fight in the “army of light” against the forces of darkness.

=== Ethics and mystical anarchism ===
In his essay “Person and Society” (published in Probuzhdenie in 1927‑28), Solonovich developed a three‑tiered ethics:

- The morality of the physic is instinct‑based.
- The morality of the psychic is grounded in personal sympathy.
- The morality of the pneumatic rests on suprapersonal love.

He held that every person who acts consciously is a mystic, because conscious action presupposes the ability to distinguish good from evil. The ultimate social goal is the creation of “concords” – free anarchic unions, communes and societies that exist only as long as each individual freely wills them.

== Legacy and rediscovery ==
=== Destruction and oblivion ===
The six‑volume treatise Bakunin and the Cult of Yaldabaoth was confiscated and destroyed by the GPU. Most of Solonovich’s other works survived only in manuscript form or as articles in émigré periodicals (Rassvet, Russkiy Vestnik – Rassvet, Probuzhdenie, Volna). After his death, the Order of Light was annihilated and its teaching vanished from public memory.

=== Rediscovery in the 1990s ===
The historian Andrei Nikitin discovered the case files of the Order in the Moscow FSB archives in the 1990s and published them in the three‑volume collection Order of the Russian Templars (1998–2003), which contains Solonovich’s lectures, interrogation protocols, the Templar legends, and related materials. The mathematician and philosopher Vasily Nalimov, a former initiate of the Order, also preserved and developed many of Solonovich’s ideas in his later works, such as The Tightrope Walker (1994).

=== Contemporary influence ===
Some of the Templar legends have been incorporated into the neopagan Rodnoverie movement. At the end of the 1990s, Aleksandr Khinevich, leader of the Church of Ynglings, published a collection of allegedly ancient “Slavo‑Aryan Vedas” that includes several legends that Nikitin had identified as Solonovich’s own compositions. Scholarly reassessments have argued that Solonovich’s mystical anarchism was not a foreign import but a native Russian development that “drew upon political philosophy, esoteric Christianity, legendary historiography, and mythopoetic imagery”. According to recent research, the movement reveals a “longue‑durée perspective on Russian New Age” and shows that post‑Soviet esotericism has deep roots in the early‑20th‑century underground.

== Selected works ==
- 1914 – Wanderings of the Spirit (Skitaniia dukha). Moscow: Sfinks.
- 1924 – “Anarchism and Socialism” (Anarkhizm i sotsializm). Volna, No. 50, pp. 16–26.
- 1926 – “Magi and Forerunners” (Volkhy i predtechi). Russkiy Vestnik – Rassvet, No. 156–157.
- 1927–28 – “Person and Society” (Lichnost' i obshchestvo). Probuzhdenie: No. 3–4 (1927), No. 6 (1928).
- 1927 – “Philosophy of Culture” (Filosofiia kul'tury). Probuzhdenie, No. 2, pp. 26–37.
- 1928 – “The Philosophical Premises of P. A. Kropotkin’s Teaching”. Probuzhdenie, No. 8, pp. 28–46.
- 1930 – “The Worker’s Task” (Zadacha rabochego). Rassvet, No. 14(182), p. 2.
- n.d. – Critique of Materialism (2nd philosophy lecture series) – published in Nikitin (2003), Vol. 3, pp. 443–514.
- n.d. – Christ and Christianity – manuscript, RGALI 122/2/2.

== See also ==
- Peter Lamborn Wilson (American anarchist who espoused similar ideas)
- Gustav Landauer
