= Apollon Karelin =

Russian anarchist (1863–1926)

- Аполлон Карелин
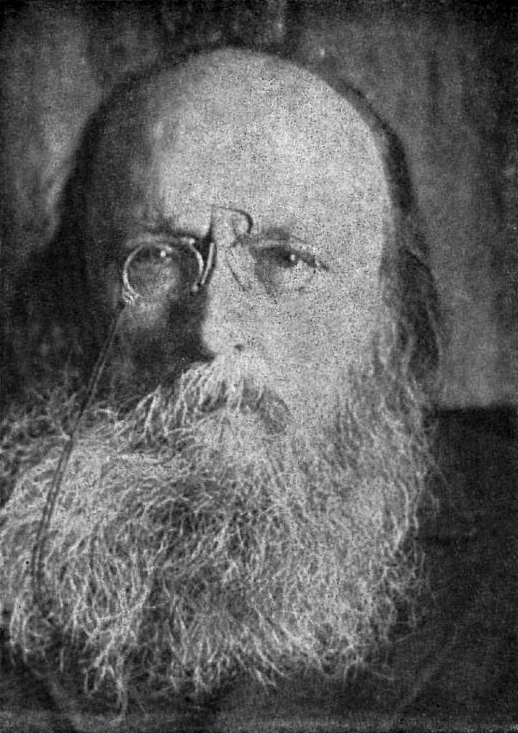
- Born: Apollon Andreyevich Karelin; 23 January 1863; Saint Petersburg, Russian Empire
- Died: 20 March 1926 (aged 63); Moscow, Soviet Union
- Other names: A. Kochegarov, "The Beard"
- Occupations: Writer, lawyer, activist
- Years active: 1881–1921
- Known for: Soviet anarchism, anarcho-mysticism
- Movement: Anarchism in Russia

Apollon Andreyevich Karelin (Russian: Аполлон Андреевич Карелин; 23 January 1863 – 20 March 1926) was a Russian anarchist activist, writer and mystic. Due to his activism, he faced arrest and internal exile from an early age. In 1905, he fled the Russian Empire to Paris, where he joined the exiled Russian anarchist movement. He became a leading voice of Russian anarchist communism, although he also generated controversy within the movement due to his association with Freemasonry and esoteric mysticism. After the outbreak of the Russian Revolution of 1917, he returned to Russia, where he agitated against the nascent parliamentary system and in favour of an agrarian socialism. After the Bolsheviks seized power, he became a leading figure of Soviet anarchism and was elected to the All-Russian Central Executive Committee. In Moscow, he founded a Russian order of the Knights Templar, through which he promoted his philosophy of anarcho-mysticism. His organisations were suppressed in the wake of the Kronstadt rebellion, although after his death, his order continued clandestinely under the leadership of Aleksei Solonovich.

== Early life and activism ==
Apollon Andreyevich Karelin was born in the Russian capital of Saint Petersburg, in 1863. The son of an artist from the Russian nobility and a schoolteacher, his family moved to Nizhny Novgorod, where he received an education and became involved in radical activism. Following the assassination of Alexander II in 1881, he was arrested and imprisoned in the Peter and Paul Fortress, but was soon released after an appeal by his parents. He then enrolled at Kazan University, where he studied law. Before long, he had returned to activism and joined the narodnik movement. Having begun his career as a lawyer, he was disbarred due to his activism. He was frequently arrested, imprisoned and internally exiled to Siberia.

== Exile ==
In 1905, Karelin managed to escape from Siberia and flee into exile in Paris, where he would spend 12 years in various Russian emigre circles. There he became known as "The Beard", a reference to his long facial hair. Initially a member of the Socialist-Revolutionary Party, in exile, he began to gravitate towards the political philosophy of anarchism and eventually quit the party. He established the Brotherhood of Free Communists, which organised lectures and published literature about anarchism. Following the suppression of the 1905 Revolution, the group protested against the imprisonment and execution of thousands of revolutionaries, comparing the Tsarist autocracy's political repression to the Inquisition and the regime of Ivan the Terrible, and denouncing Nicholas II as a "crowned hangman". He came to be affiliated with the Paris group of Russian Anarchist-Communists, headed by Marie Goldsmith, and often gave speeches at its commemorations of the Paris Commune, Haymarket affair and the birthday of Mikhail Bakunin. In 1911, he oversaw the conversion of the socialist activist Vsevolod "Volin" Eikhenbaum to anarchism. He also formed connections with exiled Russian Freemasons and joined a Masonic lodge; he was initiated into the Order of the Knights Templar, which tasked him with establishing a branch of the fraternal order in Russia.

In the early 1910s, scandals about Karelin's views and behaviour caused a split in the Russian anarchist émigré groups. The Zurich-based Russian anarchist Nikolai Rogdaev denounced Karelin for his perceived authoritarian, conspiratorial and mystical tendencies, and accused him of antisemitism. Karelin agreed to mediation in an attempt to resolve the disputes, but continuously delayed the process; leading Russian émigrés such as Peter Kropotkin and Vladimir Burtsev refused to support him. In 1913, the Brotherhood of Free Communists dissolved amid the various accusations against Karelin, as well as persistent fears that the organisation had been infiltrated by agent provocateurs.

== Revolutionary activities ==
Following the February Revolution, Karelin returned to Russia in August 1917. He brought back with him over 100 esoteric legends of the Templar Order which, according to Russian historian Andrey Nikitin, he had translated from French. He memorised the legends and passed them down as an oral tradition, without writing down any notes on them. He initially moved back to Petrograd, where he quickly gained an influence in the local anarchist-communist movement. He joined the Petrograd Federation of Anarchist Groups and became leader of its moderate anarchist-communist faction, which claimed the legacy of Peter Kropotkin's Bread and Freedom group. He gathered numerous disciples around him, including Aleksandr Ge, Aleksei Solonovich and Ivan Kharkhardin, the latter of whom compared Karelin to a "Biblical patriarch".

He wrote numerous pamphlets and articles and giving lectures on a variety of political and economic subjects, sometimes under the pen name of "A. Kochegarov". One of his most popular pamphlets from this time was a critique of representative democracy, which he depicted as another form of plutocracy and authoritarian government. He argued that, even under universal suffrage, workers would never gain true representation in a parliamentary system, as political parties would exclusively nominate candidates from professional, managerial and intellectual backgrounds for election. In the anarchist-communist magazine Burevestnik, he argued against the syndicalist programme of workers' control, which he considered to be a compromise with capitalism that would leave the exploitative relationship between workers and management unchanged. He also called for the redistribution of land from the nobility, church and state to the peasantry, with the ultimate goal of establishing a federation of autonomous municipalities, in which all forms of property ownership would be abolished and resources would be distributed according to individual needs. He later wrote a book of utopian fiction, depicting a future in which Russia had become an anarchistic and agrarian stateless society.

After the Bolsheviks seized power in the October Revolution, they moved the capital city of the new Russian Soviet Republic to Moscow, which became the new centre of the Russian anarchist-communist movement. The new government promulgated a Decree on Land, which initially implemented Karelin's proposal for the redistribution of land to the peasantry, but in February 1918, this was reversed by a subsequent decree that nationalised land. By early 1918, Karelin had moved to Moscow and joined the Moscow Federation of Anarchist Groups. Together with Abba Gordin, he agitated among the city's workers, distributing anarchist literature and holding lively political debates. Karelin and Gordin both became leading figures of Soviet anarchism, a tendency which sought to promote anarchist collaboration with the Bolsheviks. In the spring of 1918, Karelin established the All-Russian Federation of Anarchist-Communists, which aimed to convince anti-Bolshevik anarchists to support the Soviet government. Karelin believed that a period of dictatorship was necessary to defend the revolution and suppress reactionary forces, and argued that it constituted an acceptable transitionary stage that would bring society closer to anarchism. Karelin was himself elected to the All-Russian Central Executive Committee, although he and other anarchist-communists held non-voting observer status.

== Later life and mysticism ==
Following his election to the All-Russian Central Executive Committee, Karelin was given an apartment in the First House of Soviets, where he began developing a new philosophy of anarcho-mysticism. His other anarchist activities, including with the Anarchist-Communist Federation, were soon subordinated to his pursuits in mystical philosophy. In 1919, Karelin established a branch of the Knights Templar in Moscow, bringing together both anarchists and non-partisan intellectuals, which organised lectures that presented anarchism as an esoteric "religion of truth". Drawing from Gnosticism, Russian symbolism and theosophy, Karelin's anarcho-mysticism shifted from a political and economic philosophy to an ethical and spiritual one. Karelin himself considered mystical anarchism to be a revival of Gnosticism. Karelin's mystical anarchism centred free will and self-sacrifice for the common good as its ethical values, and constructed an esoteric "alternative history" of the world. His Soviet anarchism and anarcho-mysticism were both sources of criticism among the wider Russian anarchist movement, with Alexei Borovoi describing Karelin as a "vulgar anarchic holy-roller, self-righteous hypocrite, Jesuit, who didn't stop at mystifications, at lies, at backstabbing".

Karelin later established the Anarchist Black Cross, which was dedicated to providing prisoner support to anarchists who had been imprisoned by the Soviet state. Upon the outbreak of the Kronstadt rebellion, Karelin's All-Russian Federation declared its support for the revolt and denounced the government's attempts to suppress it. Karelin's All-Russian Federation of Anarchists was subsequently suppressed and many of his disciples were arrested and internally exiled. In 1925, Karelin and Avel Yenukidze intervened to free his disciple Solonovich from detention, which was granted on the condition he not organise any more anarchist groups. After seeing his movement suppressed, Karelin died from an intracerebral hemorrhage, in 1926.

== Legacy ==
According to Russian philosopher Vasily Nalimov, Karelin continued to hold a "special spiritual power", even after his death. His disciple Aleksei Solonovich succeeded him as the head of the Templar Order in Moscow and became the leader of the mysticist tendency of Russian anarchism. Solonovich kept large portraits of Karelin and Mikhail Bakunin in his office on Ostozhenka street. Solonovich's use of the Kropotkin Museum to promote Karelin's mystical version of anarchism caused conflict within the Russian anarchist movement, with its more materialist members attempting to "purge" the museum of mysticist influence. The mysticists managed to win over Sofia Kropotkin, the head curator of the Kropotkin Museum. They were also the revolutionary tendency that maintained neutrality towards the Soviet government for the longest period.

Following Joseph Stalin's rise to power, the mystical anarchist movement and Templar Order were both suppressed and Solonovich himself was exiled to Siberia. The Templar Order continued to operate as a clandestine organisation, both underground in the Soviet Union and in exile in Western Europe. After the fall of the Soviet Union, Andrei Nikitin uncovered evidence of Karelin's Templar Order in the archives of the Federal Security Service and collected together much of its material, including theatre plays apparently written by Karelin. In 2009, Russian historian Vladimir Sapon published a biography of Karelin.

== Selected works ==
Pamphlets

- Obshchestvennoe vladenie v Rossii (Saint Petersburg, 1893)
- Polozhitelnye i otritsatelnye storony demokratii s tochki zreniia anarkhistov-kommunistov (Geneva, 1893)
- Zemelnaia programma anarkhistov-kommunistov (London, 1912)
- Novoe kratkoe izlozhenie politicheskoi ekonomii (New York, 1918)
- Gosudarstvo i anarkhisty (Moscow, 1918)
- K voprosu o kommunizme (Moscow, 1918)
- Fabriki-Narodu (Moscow, 1919)
- Rossiia v 1930 godu (Moscow, 1921)
- Chto takoe anarkhiia (Moscow, 1923)
- Smertnaia kazn (Detroit, 1923)
- Tak govoril Bakunin (Bridgeport, 1923)
- Gorodskie rabochie, krestianstvo, vlast i sobstvennost (Buenos Aires, 1924)

Collections

- Volnaia zhizn (Detroit, 1955)

== Bibliography ==
- Avrich, Paul (1971) [1967]. The Russian Anarchists. Princeton: Princeton University Press. ISBN 0-691-00766-7. OCLC 1154930946.
- Burenina-Petrova, Olga (2020). "Science Fiction in the Russian Avant-garde Cinema of the 1920s and Anarchism". In Gratchev, Slav (ed.). The Poetics of the Avant-garde in Literature, Arts, and Philosophy. pp. 135–150. ISBN 978-1-7936-1574-9.
- Fitzé, Eliane (2020). "Interdisciplinary panel on the Russian peasantry and notions of 'Russianness', at the Annual Convention of the Association for Slavic, East European, and Eurasian Studies (ASEEES)". Крестьяноведение. 5 (4): 198–201. doi:10.22394/2500-1809-2020-5-4-198-201.
- Kaltenbach, Romina (2022). "Russia's Mystical Anarchism: the Case of Aleksej Solonovich (1887-1937)" (PDF). Journal of Comparative Studies. 15 (44): 124–151. ISSN 2592-8279.
- Nalimov, V. V. (2001). "On the History of Mystical Anarchism in Russia". International Journal of Transpersonal Studies. 20. Translated by Yarkho, A. V.: 85–98. doi:10.24972/ijts.2001.20.1.85.
- Szarapow (2010). "Life of the Anarchist 'Jesuit' (Apollon Karelin)". KSL: Bulletin of the Kate Sharpley Library (61): 4–5. ISSN 1475-0309.
