= Alexander Dmitrievich Zinoviev =

Russian politician and governor (1854 - 1931)

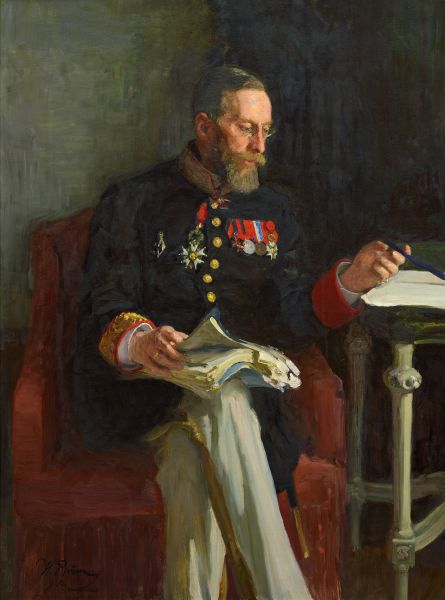
Alexander Dmitrievich Zinoviev, portrait by Ilya Repin

Alexander Dmitrievich Zinoviev, in Russian: Алекса́ндр Дми́триевич Зино́вьев, (16 May 1854, Koporye - 7 February 1931, Rome) was a Russian politician, privy counsellor (1906), Civil Governor of Saint Petersburg from 6 March 1903 to January 1911, member of the State Council of the Russian Empire (1911), Marshal of the Nobility from 8 August 1897 to February 1904.

== Biography ==
Born into a family of the Russian nobility, Alexander Dmitrievich Zinoviev studied law at the University of Saint Petersburg and graduated in 1877.

From 1884 to 1897, Zinoviev was a member of the nobility for the region of Saint Petersburg. Between 1897 and 1902 he served as head of the nobility of the same region. On 6 March 1903, Nicholas II of Russia appointed him Civil Governor of Saint Petersburg, a position in which he remained until January 1911. During the same period he was Senior Director of Saint Petersburg and Malo-Krestovsky. In 1911, Zinoviev was admitted to the Council of State.

During his tenure as Civil Governor of Saint Petersburg, the Church of the Savior on Spilled Blood, whose work began in 1883, was completed in 1907.

After the October Revolution, Zinoviev fled Russia. He died in Rome in 1931.

He was the brother of Lydia Zinovieva-Annibal (1866–1907), poet and writer, second wife of Vyacheslav Ivanov, with whom she hosted in Saint Petersburg "The Tower", the most important literary and artistic salon of the Silver Age.

== Bibliography ==
J. N. Dlugolensky Civil-military and police authorities in St. Petersburg, 1703-1917. St. Petersburg, 2001. pp. 237–239.

== See also ==
=== Connected articles ===
- Saint Petersburg Governorate

=== External links ===
- Saint Petersburg Encyclopaedia
