= Vyacheslav Ivanov (poet) =

Russian poet and playwright (1866–1949)

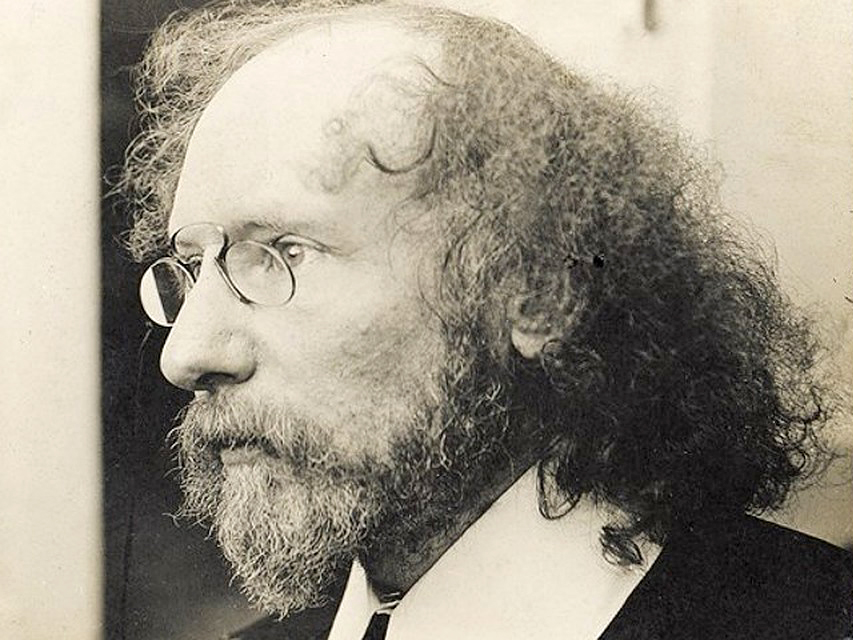
- Ivanov in 1900
- Born: Vyacheslav Ivanovich Ivanov; 28 February 1866; Moscow, Russian Empire
- Died: 16 July 1949 (aged 83); Rome, Italy
- Education: Moscow State University, Berlin University
- Occupations: poet and playwright

Vyacheslav Ivanovich Ivanov (Russian: Вячесла́в Ива́нович Ива́нов, Italian: Venceslao Ivanov; 28 February [O.S. 16 February] 1866 – 16 July 1949) was a Russian poet, playwright, Classicist, and senior literary and dramatic theorist of the Russian Symbolist movement. He was also a philosopher, translator, and literary critic.

Born into the lower Russian nobility, the multilingual Ivanov studied Classics, philology, and philosophy. He married the sister of a school friend and aspired to live as a conventional family man, until he discovered the philosophy of Friedrich Nietzsche while in Rome. Following a surrender to their mutual attraction one night in the Colosseum, Ivanov left his wife and daughter for married Russian poet Lydia Zinovieva-Annibal. Following their Orthodox ecclesiastical divorces and clandestine remarriage in a Greek Orthodox ceremony at Livorno, Ivanov and Zinovieva-Annibal returned to their homeland and plunged headfirst into Tsarist Russia's literary bohemia.

For most of the remaining years of the Pre-1917 Silver Age of Russian Poetry, Ivanov presided over a weekly literary salon near the Tauride Palace in St. Petersburg. He helped discover the poet Anna Akhmatova and served as a highly influential teacher and mentor to philosopher Nikolai Berdyaev, Symbolist poet and future Russian Orthodox martyr Maria Skobtsova, and Nobel Prize-winning poet and novelist Boris Pasternak.

Similarly to his contemporaries Hugo von Hofmannsthal and Max Reinhardt in the Germanosphere, Ivanov was an influential avant garde dramatic theorist and sought, under the influence of Ancient Greek, Medieval, and Spanish Golden Age theatre, to blur and even to erase the fourth wall and make the audience into participants in the dramas they attended. The innovative theatre director Vsevolod Meyerhold is only one of those who has been influenced by Ivanov's dramatic philosophy.

Following the First World War, the October Revolution, the Russian Civil War, and his 1924 emigration from the Soviet Union to Fascist Italy, Ivanov converted in 1926 to the Russian Greek Catholic Church, which remains one of the smallest of the Eastern Catholic Churches. Ivanov had previously lived a life so hedonistic that he later compared his conversion in a work of Russian poetry to that of St. Augustine.

In 1931, Ivanov successfully defended Christianity in a public debate against Benedetto Croce, which enormously bolstered his intellectual reputation in the West. Ivanov spent the remainder of his life in Rome as a professor at both the Pontifical Oriental Institute and the Russicum, where his students included future Martyrs and confessors under Stalinism Bishop Theodore Romzha, Fr. Pietro Leoni, and Fr. Walter Ciszek. His close friends as a refugee included Martin Buber, Sir Isaiah Berlin, Sir Maurice Bowra, and Charles Du Bos.

Since his death in 1949, Ivanov's writing has been praised and referenced by Pope John Paul II, who often referenced Ivanov's metaphor about Roman and Byzantine Christianity representing the two lungs of Christendom. Furthermore, after decades of his writings being banned by government censorship in his homeland, Ivanov has witnessed a great revival of interest since the collapse of the Soviet Union in 1991.

== Early life ==
Born in Moscow, Ivanov lost his father, a minor civil servant, when he was only five years old and was subsequently raised within the Russian Orthodox Church by his deeply religious mother. He graduated from the First Moscow Gymnasium with a gold medal and entered Moscow University where he studied history and philosophy under Sir Paul Vinogradoff. In 1886, he moved to Berlin University to study Classics, Roman law, and economics under Theodor Mommsen. During his stay in Imperial Germany, he absorbed the poetry and philosophy of German Romanticism, most notably as represented by Novalis, Friedrich Hölderlin, and Goethe. Ivanov's main passionate interest, however, was in researching the connection between the Greek religious cult of Dionysus and his worship during the Bacchanalia with the creation of the theatre of ancient Greece.

In 1886 Ivanov married Darya Mikhailovna Dmitrievskaya, the sister of his close childhood friend Aleksei Dmitrievsky. From 1892 he studied archaeology in Rome, completing his doctoral dissertation there. In 1893 he met Lydia Zinovieva-Annibal, a well-to-do amateur singer, poet, and translator, who had recently separated from her husband. Through their shared descent from 17th-century Afro-Russian military officer and aristocrat Abram Petrovich Gannibal, Lidia was also a distant relation of Russian national poet Alexander Pushkin.

Influenced by his recent discovery and enthusiasm for the philosophical writings of Friedrich Nietzsche, Ivanov and Zinovieva-Annibal surrendered to their mutual attraction, "during a tempestuous night at the Colosseum, which he described in verse as a ritualistic breaking of taboos and regeneration of ancient religious fervor."

In 1895, Ivanov's wife and daughter separated from him almost immediately and, on 15 April 1896, Lidia gave birth to Ivanov's second daughter, who was named Lidia, after her mother.

Both wronged spouses were easily granted Orthodox ecclesiastical divorces, under the terms of which Viacheslav Ivanov and Lidia Zinovieva-Annibal were ruled the guilty parties and were accordingly forbidden a Russian Orthodox wedding. Making use of a common dodge at the time, Ivanov and Lidia dressed in Ancient Greek religious costumes deliberately reminiscent of the cult of Dionysus and were married in a Greek Orthodox ceremony at Livorno in 1899.

Despite the rejection of Christian morality represented by both the adulterous beginning of his relationship with Lidia and their decision, similarly to many other members of Tsarist Russia's literary bohemia, to have an open marriage, Ivanov would paradoxically recall, "Through each other we discovered ourselves - and more than ourselves: I would say that we found God."

They first settled in Athens, then moving to Geneva, and making pilgrimages to Egypt and Palestine. During that period, Ivanov frequently visited Italy, where he studied Renaissance art. The rugged nature of Lombardy and the Alps became the subject of his first sonnets, which were heavily influenced by the medieval poetry of Catholic mystics.

At the turn of the 20th century, Ivanov elaborated his views on the spiritual mission of Rome and the Ancient Greek cult of Dionysus. He summed up his Dionysian ideas in the treatise The Hellenic Religion of the Suffering God (1904), which traces the roots of literature in general and, following Nietzsche's The Birth of Tragedy, the art of tragedy in particular to ancient Dionysian mysteries. This was because, similarly to his hero Vladimir Soloviev, Ivanov, "understood Nietzsche as a Christian thinker in spite of himself. This explains why he applies New Testament concepts to Nietzsche's fundamentally anti-Christian worldview."

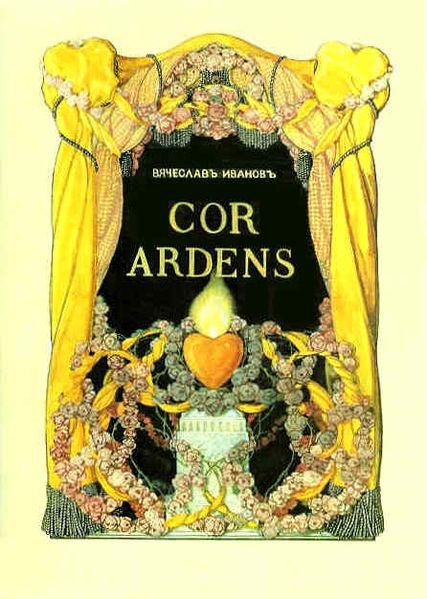
Somov's frontispiece for Ivanov's book Cor Ardens (1907).

With the assistance of both his ex-wife and the poet and philosopher Vladimir Soloviev, Ivanov's first collection, Lodestars, was published in 1903. It contained many of his pieces written a decade earlier and was praised by the leading critics as a new chapter in Russian Symbolism. The poems were compared to Milton's and Trediakovsky's on account of their detached, calculated archaism. Similarly to his contemporary T.S. Eliot, Ivanov drew heavily, according to literary scholar Robert Bird, upon, "epigraphs from a host of languages ... and in a variety of alphabets", while also experimenting, "in grafting Classical Greek metres and syntax onto Russian verse", and revelling, "in obscure archaisms and recondite allusions to antiquity."

== The Tower ==
After capturing the attention of Russian Symbolist poet Valery Bryusov while delivering a series of lectures on the cult of Dionysus at a short-lived Russian University in Paris in 1903, in 1905 Vyacheslav and Lidia Ivanov made their triumphant return to St Petersburg, where they were much lionized as foreign curiosities. They set up a literary salon known as "Среды Иванова" (Ivanov Wednesdays, better known as "On the Tower", from its location).

According to James H. Billington, "'Viacheslav the Magnificent' was the crown prince and chef de salon of the new society, which met in his seventh-floor apartment 'The Tower,' overlooking the gardens of the Tauride Palace in St. Peterburg. Walls and partitions were torn down to accommodate the increasing numbers of talented and disputatious people who flocked to the Wednesday soirees, which were rarely in full swing until after supper had been served at 2 A.M."

According to his close friend Nikolai Berdyaev, "Ivanov succeeded in combining an intense poetical imagination with an amazing knowledge of Classical philology and Greek religion. He was a philosopher and a theologian; a theosophist and a political publicist. There was no object upon which he could not throw some new and unexpected light."

Nicholas Zernov later wrote about both Ivanov and the meetings in the Tower, "He attracted the intellectuals and the artists who discussed religion, philosophy, literature, and politics; they listened to music and the recitation of poetry. Berdyaev usually presided over these gatherings, but the lead was taken by Ivanov, a man who brought people of the most diverse views and convictions into one fold; Christians and sceptics, monarchists and republicans, Symbolists and Classicists, occultists and mystical anarchists. They were all welcomed as long as they were original, daring and ready to spend hours in stimulating discussions."

Even during the Russian Revolution of 1905 and as the First Duma began meeting across the road, the Tower became a fashionable literary salon of the Silver Age of Russian Poetry, and was frequented by poets (Alexander Blok), philosophers (Nikolai Berdyayev), artists (Konstantin Somov), and dramatists (Vsevolod Meyerhold). The Ivanovs exerted an influence upon the Russian Symbolist movement, whose main tenets were formulated in the turreted house.

At the Tower, Ivanov spearheaded a seachange which brought Russian Symbolism radically away from the intentions of Valery Bryusov to emulate French Symbolism and the concept of art for art's sake, towards literary Philhellenism, Neoclassicism, Germanophilia, and, in particular, towards the recent German philosophy and dramatic theories of both Richard Wagner and Friedrich Nietzsche. Ivanov favored the promotion of an ecstatic (in both the religious and philosophical senses) theatre of mass participation. Ivanov regarded drama as having the potential to be the most powerful of the arts and as capable of taking over the liturgical function of the Russian Orthodox Church and restoring religious belief to a society that had lost its faith in Christianity.

Ivanov wrote in an early essay, "Let us take a look at drama, which in modern history has replaced the spectacles of universal and holy events as reflected in miniature and purely signifying forms on the stages of the mystery plays. We know that classical French tragedy is one of triumphs of the transformational, decisive idealistic principle. Calderón, however, is different. In him, everything is but a signification of the objective truth of Divine Providence, which governs human destiny. A pious son of the Spanish Church, he was able to combine all the daring of naive individualism with the most profound realism of the mystical contemplation of divine things."

Future Russian Orthodox nun and martyr Maria Skobtsova was then an acclaimed Symbolist poet and frequent guest at the Ivanov flat. Decades later, while living in Paris as an anti-communist White emigre who had returned to her ancestral religious roots, Skobtsova felt deeply ashamed as she recalled the hedonistic atmosphere among the intellectuals at the Tower. She often expressed the belief that her past self and all her colleagues at the Tower could have learned much from any rural peasant woman praying in her Orthodox parish church. Skobtsova elaborated, "We lived in the middle of a vast country as if on an uninhabited island. Russia was illiterate, whereas our milieu was concentrated all the culture of the world: the Greeks were quoted by heart, we welcomed the French symbolists, we thought of Scandinavian literature as our own, we were familiar with the philosophy, theology, poetry and history of the whole wide world, in this sense we were citizens of the universe, the keepers of mankind's cultural museum. This was Rome in the time of its decline... We played out the last act of the tragedy concerned with the rift between the intelligentsia and the people. Beyond us stretched out the Russian Empire's snowy desert, a country in fetters: it was as ignorant of our delights as of our anguish, while its own delights and anguish had no effect on us.

More recently, Robert Bird has been less critical, "Nomenclature notwithstanding, Russian Symbolism owed far less to French Symbolism (with which, according to Ivanov, it shared 'neither a historical no ideological basis's) than it did to German Romanticism and to the great poets and prose writers of nineteenth-century Russia. It was not so much an artistic movement as a comprehensive worldview, an attempt to give aesthetics a spiritual foundation. The Russian Symbolists sought to preserve the insights and achievements of past civilisations and to build upon them. They viewed human creativity as a continuum, celebrating 'Symbolist' tendencies in the art and culture of civilisations distant both temporally and spatially... According to Symbolist conviction, divisions between various fields of knowledge and artistic disciplines were artificial: poetry was intimately linked not only to painting, music, and drama, but also to philosophy, psychology, religion, and myth. The intellectual cross fertilization that took place at Ivanov's 'Tower', in short, was a social manifestation of Symbolist tenets."

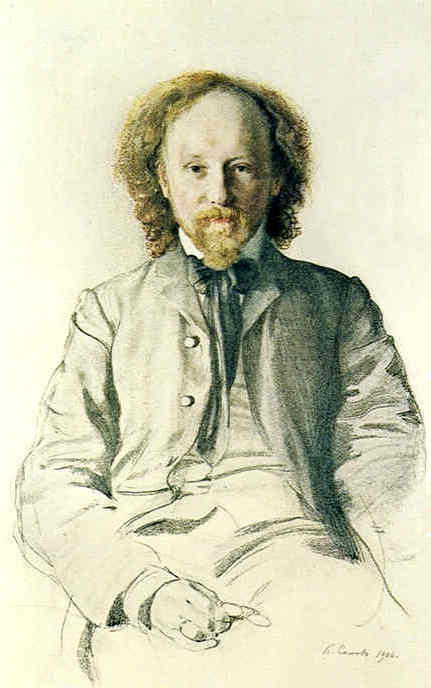
Portrait by Konstantin Somov (1906).

It was at this time that Ivanov wrote the first of his two plays, Tantalus (1905). Like his second, Prometheus (1919), it imitated the dramatic structure and mythological subject-matter of Aeschylean tragedy and was written in obscure and archaic language. It was his unrealised, utopian ideas about theatre, however, that proved far more influential.

The ideas of Aleksei Remizov (who was the literary manager of Vsevolod Meyerhold's New Drama Association at this time), Fyodor Sologub, and the Mystical Anarchism of Georgy Chulkov were all part of this second phase of Russian Symbolism.

Ivanov proposed the creation of a new type of mass theatre, which he called a "collective action," that would be modelled on ancient religious rituals, Athenian tragedy, and the medieval mystery play. Writing in an essay on the mask ("Poèt i Čern") that was published in the magazine Vesy (Libra or The Scales) in 1904, Ivanov argued for a revival of the ancient relationship between the poet and the masses. Inspired by The Birth of Tragedy and Wagner's theory of Gesamtkunstwerk, Ivanov sought to provide a philosophical foundation for his proposals by linking Nietzsche's analysis with Leo Tolstoy's Christian religious movement, and ancient Dionysian dramas with later Christian mystery plays. The idea that both the Apollonian and Dionysian could be synthesized within a concept of universal brotherhood would have been completely alien to Nietzsche, who had always stressed the fundamental differences between the two traditions. Ivanov, however, interpreted Dionysus as an avatar for Jesus Christ. By means of the mask, he argued, the tragic hero appears not as an individual character but rather as the embodiment of a fundamental Dionysian reality, "the one all-human I." By means of hero's example, therefore, staged myth would give the people access to its sense of the "total unity of suffering."

Rejecting theatrical illusion, Ivanov's modern liturgical theatre would offer not the representation of action (mimesis), but action itself (praxis). This would be achieved by overcoming the separation between stage and auditorium, adopting an open space similar to the classical Greek orchêstra, and abolishing the division between the actors and the audience, so that all became co-creating participants in a sacred rite. Ivanov imagined staging such a performance in a hall in which furniture is distributed "by whim and inspiration." Actors would mingle with the audience, handing out masks and costumes, before, singing and dancing as a chorus, collective improvisation would merge all participants into a communal unity.

Thus, he hoped, the theatre would facilitate a genuinely spiritual revolution in culture and society. Writing in Po zvezdam in 1908, Ivanov argued:

The theatres of the chorus tragedies, the comedies and the mysteries must become the breeding-ground for the creative, or prophetic, self-determination of the people; only then will be resolved the problem of fusing actors and spectators in a single orgiastic body. [...] And only, we may add, when the choral voice of such communities becomes a genuine referendum of the true will of the people will political freedom become a reality.

While some, such as the director Meyerhold, enthusiastically embraced Ivanov's ideas (at least insofar as they proposed overcoming the division between actor and audience in a collective improvisation), others were more skeptical. The poet Andrei Bely argued that the realities of a modern, class-divided society could not be abolished by means of masks and costumes, however earnestly adopted:

Let's suppose we go into the temple-theatre, robe ourselves in white clothes, crown ourselves with bunches of roses, perform a mystery play (its theme is always the same—God-like man wrestles with fate) and then at the appropriate moment we join hands and begin to dance. Imagine yourself, reader, if only for just one minute, in this role. We are the ones who will be spinning round the sacrificial altar—all of us: the fashionable lady, the up-and-coming stockbroker, the worker and the member of the State Council. It is too much to expect that our steps and our gestures will coincide. While the class struggle still exists, these appeals for an aesthetic democratization are strange.

== Splintered Symbolism ==
His wife's death in 1907 was a great blow to Ivanov. Thereafter the dazzling Byzantine texture of his poetry wore thin, as he insensibly slipped into theosophy and spiritualism, while being preyed upon emotionally and financially by a fraudulent medium who claimed the ability to summon Lydia from the afterlife.

The medium departed for other targets, however, after Ivanov had a dream of his late wife ordering him to marry Vera Shvarsalon, her daughter by her first marriage. Indeed, he married 23-year-old Vera in the summer of 1913; their son Dmitry had been born in 1912. Vera's death in 1920, at the age of 30, broke his heart.

According to an autobiographical sketch written by Anna Akhmatova, Ivanov first met her in 1910. At the time, Akhmatova was still married to Nikolai Gumilev, who first brought her to the turreted house. There, Akhmatova read some of her verse aloud to Ivanov, who ironically quipped, "What truly heavy romanticism."

Moreover, Akhmatova indignantly recalled that Ivanov would often weep as she recited her verse at the Tower, but would later, "vehemently criticize," the same poems at literary salons. Akhmatova would never forgive him for this.

A short time later, Gumilev left his wife for a big game hunting holiday in Ethiopia. In the aftermath, Ivanov, who very likely wanted to have an affair with her, tried very hard to persuade Akhmatova to leave her immature husband, saying, "You'll make him a man if you do." Instead, following his return, Gumilev listened to his wife's poetry for the first time with respect. Furthermore, they departed with Osip Mandelstam to found the Acmeist movement, which rejected Ivanov and Symbolism. Akhmatova's ultimate evaluation of her former admirer was as follows, "Vyacheslav was neither grand nor magnificent (he thought this up himself) but a 'catcher of men.'"

Meanwhile, according to Lazar Fleishman, "The year 1910 marked a crisis in the history of Russian Symbolism. It became clear that the movement was breaking up into two hostile camps. One, headed by Viacheslav Ivanov, constituted the theurgist line (going back to Vladimir Solovyov). The opposite camp, with Valery Bryusov as its major spokesman, rejected all of Symbolism's claims to transcend the limits of art, to fuse art and life, and to subordinate art to religious or mystical goals. Alexander Scriabin's close relations with the Symbolist poets strengthened the theurgist wing of this literary school."

On 19 April 1910, Vsevolod Meyerhold staged Konstantin Balmont's literary translation of Calderón's Adoration of the Holy Cross inside of Ivanov's St Petersburg flat. Many of the most important figures in Russian literature at the time were either present or appearing in the play.

On 18 February 1912, the writer Konstantin Siunnerberg brought Fr. Leonid Feodorov, a priest of the strictly illegal Russian Greek Catholic Church who was on his third secret visit to Russia, to a meeting of the Society of Lovers of the Artistic Word and introduced him to Ivanov. During the subsequent meeting, Ivanov then read aloud an early draft of his essay "Thoughts about Symbolism" and Andrei Bely read aloud his essay "Symbolism". Feodorov later recalled, "The first was quite interesting, the second was a typical example of the chaos reigning in the minds of our intelligentsia... Vyacheslav Ivanov turned out to be a supporter of the Catholic Church and took great interest in the Byzantine Rite. However, his sympathies towards Rome and those of many like him are based on motives of an aesthetic and mystical character, of quite vague and extremely whimsical fantasies."

During an Italian voyage with his wife (1912–13), Ivanov met often with Aurelio Palmieri, an Italian scholar of Eastern Christianity, whose writings were later condemned by the Church as Modernistic. During the same trip Ivanov also routinely defended Catholicism in debates with Vladimir Ern.

Following the Ivanovs' return to Russia in 1913, they made the acquaintances of art critic Mikhail Gershenzon, philosopher Sergei Bulgakov, and composer Alexander Scriabin. He elaborated many of his Symbolist theories in a series of articles, which were finally revised and reissued as Simbolismo in 1936. At that time, he relinquished poetry in favour of translating the works of Sappho, Alcaeus, Aeschylus, and Petrarch into the Russian language.

Ivanov continued, however, to have influence over younger poets and writers. While reading his newly composed paper aloud called, "Symbolism and Immortality" on 10 February 1913, a young Boris Pasternak both echoed and summarized the ideas of both Bely and Ivanov, by saying, "Symbolism achieves realism in religion."

In his diary Cursed Days, Ivan Bunin later recalled, "Once in the spring of 1915, I was walking in the Moscow Zoological Garden and saw a guard... beating a swan with his boot and smashing ducks' heads with the heel of his shoe. When I got home I found V. Ivanov waiting for me. I had to listen to a turgid speech about Russia's 'Christ-like image' and about how, once Russia proved victorious over Germany, this Christ-like Russia would accomplish another great task, i.e., it would spiritually enlighten India -- no less a country than India, which, as regards enlightenment, is three thousand years older than we are!"

== After 1917 ==
In 1920, Ivanov moved to Baku, where he held the University Chair of Classical Philology. He concentrated on his scholarly work and completed a treatise Dionysus and Early Dionysianism (published 1923), which earned him a Ph.D. degree in philology. The new Marxist-Leninist government didn't allow Ivanov and his family to emigrate from the Soviet Union, but through the influence of his former protege Anatoly Lunacharsky, exit visas were finally granted in 1924.

== Emigration ==
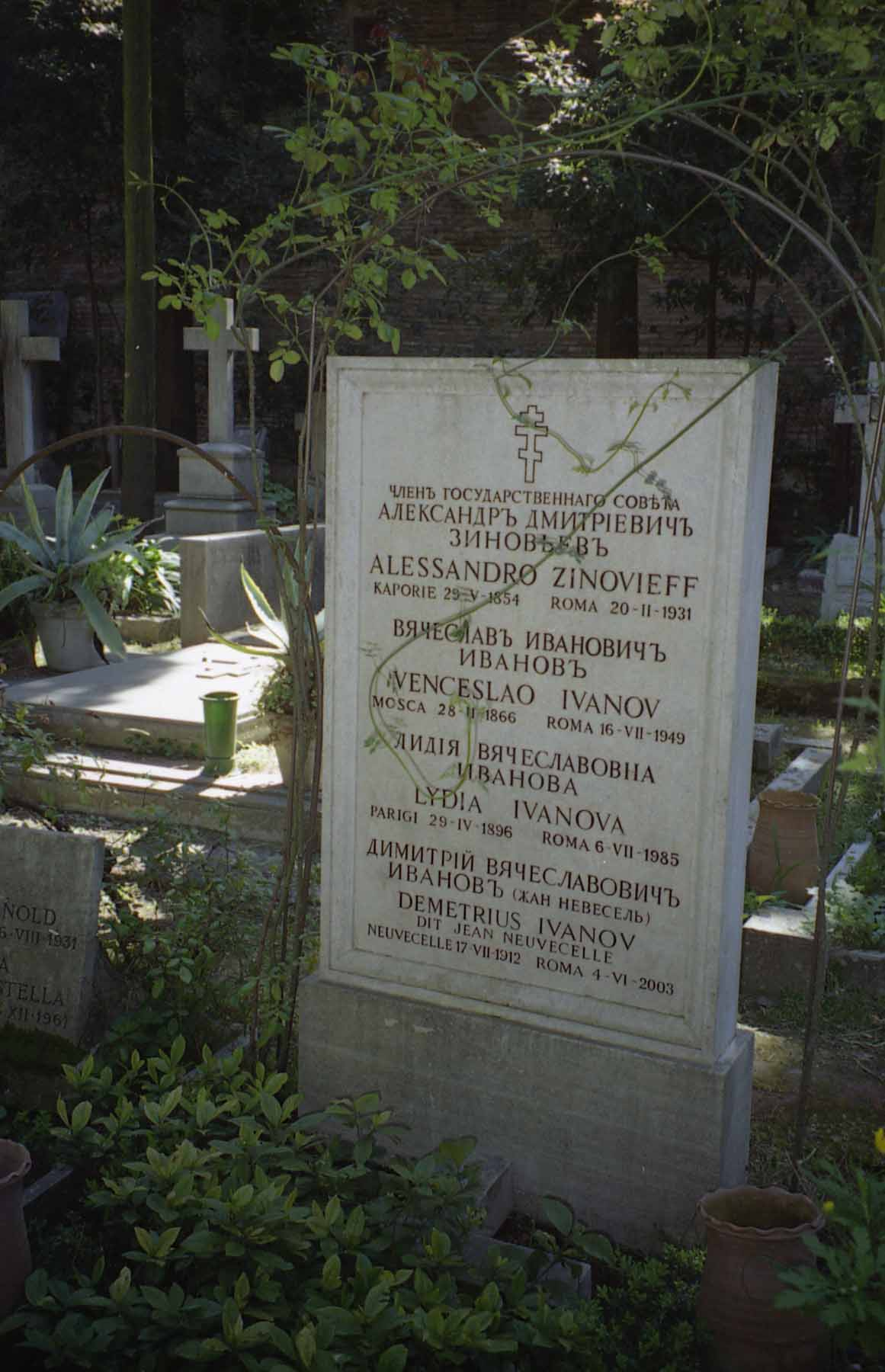
Ivanov's grave in Rome.

From Azerbaijan he proceeded to Italy, where he settled first at Pavia, where he was employed as Professor of Russian literature between 1926 and 1934. He was then elected professor of Russian literature at the University of Florence, but the Government of Fascist Italy, refused to allow Ivanov to take up the position. In 1934, Ivanov and his family arrived in Rome, an event he later commemorated in the sonnet Regina Viarum in 1924.

Ivanov later explained his reasons for becoming a refugee by stating, "I was born free, and the silence there (i.e. in Soviet Russia) leaves an aftertaste of slavery."

For this reason, according to Robert Bird, "Eloquently conversant in all the major European languages, with erudition of rare breadth and depth, Ivanov allied himself with representatives of the religious and cultural revival that occurred in many countries between the wars."

While teaching the Old Church Slavonic liturgical language, the vernacular Russian language, and Russian literature at the Pontifical Oriental Institute, Ivanov and his children were formally received as Eastern Rite Catholics into the Russian Greek Catholic Church.

On 17 March 1926, Ivanov pronounced a prayer for reunification composed by his hero Vladimir Soloviev followed by a standard abjuration under oath of all theological principles upon which Russian Orthodoxy differs from Catholicism. In a 1930 open letter in French explaining his conversion to Charles Du Bos, Ivanov recalled, "When I pronounced the Creed, followed by a formula of adherence, I felt Orthodox in the full sense of the word for the first time in my life, in full possession of the sacred treasure that had belonged to me since my baptism, the joy of which had, however, been encumbered for many years by a sense of growing anguish and by the consciousness that I had been severed by the other half of this living treasure of sanctity and grace, that, like a consumptive, I had been breathing with only one lung."

In his 1937 interview for the Russicum's newspaper, Ivanov argued that, prior to their Great Schism, Latin and Byzantine Christianity were "two principles that mutually complement each other." After blaming, similarly to Fyodor Dostoevsky in The Brothers Karamazov, the lack of an indigenous tradition of active monasticism for the failure of the Russian Orthodox Church to mount a far more effective challenge to the regressive secularization of pre-1917 Russian culture, Ivanov concluded, "The Church must permeate all branches of life: social issues, art, culture, and just everything. The Roman Church corresponds to such criteria and by joining this Church I become truly Orthodox." Literary scholar Robert Bird confirms that Ivanov, whose greatest influences were Vladimir Soloviev and Fyodor Dostoevsky, viewed his conversion to the Russian Greek Catholic Church, "as an extension rather than a rejection of Russian Orthodoxy. This decision was in a sense preordained by the philosophy of Vladimir Soloviev."

Despite his lack of a steady income and worries about the health of his son Dmitri, "by the early 1930s, Ivanov had become a minor star in the European intellectual firmament."

In 1931, Ivanov's intellectual status was further buttressed by a successful defense of Christianity during a debate against Benedetto Croce, who had travelled with a large entourage from Milan especially for the occasion.

Beginning on 11 February 1936, Ivanov began teaching on Tuesdays as professor of Church Slavonic and eventually of many other subjects at the Russicum, a Byzantine Rite Catholic major seminary and Russian-language immersion school in Rome, which Pope Pius XI had established in 1929 to train priests of the Russian Greek Catholic Church for missionary work in the Soviet Union and the Russian diaspora. Ivanov's students at the Russicum included future Greek Catholic Martyr Bishop Theodore Romzha, as well as Gulag survivors and memoirists Frs. Walter Ciszek and Pietro Leoni.

Ivanov's lectures at the Russicum on Russian literature were considered so challenging that only native Russian speakers and those seminarians most advanced in learning the language attended. Between 1939 and 1940, Ivanov gave a celebrated series of lectures on the novels of Dostoevsky and, during Russian Christmas in 1940, he gave a reading of several of his own works of Christian poetry about the Nativity of Jesus Christ.

According to former Russicum seminarian Gustav Wetter, Ivanov once summarized the main tenets of Russian Symbolism during a lecture with two quotations. The first was from the German national poet Goethe, "Alles vergängliche ist nur ein Gleichnis" ("Everything ephemeral is only a reflection"). The second principle, according to Ivanov, was the ascent of the human mind, "a realibus ad realiora" ("From what is real to what is more real.") Gustav Wetter later recalled of Ivanov's lecture, "These two principles engraved themselves in my soul. Symbolism began to play a huge role in my own thought."

Furthermore, according to Fr. Constantin Simon, Ivanov's, "services as a translator, whose golden pen deftly transformed elegant Latin into an equally refined Church Slavonic, were eagerly sought by the Jesuits of the Russian Apostolate as well as by the Vatican. In addition to Biblical texts, Ivanov prepared Church Slavonic translations of, among other prayers, the litanies to the Sacred Heart and Immaculate Heart, the Salve Regina, the texts of the Jesuit vows, and the invocations to the Little Flower."

According to Robert Bird, "In the emigration, Ivanov proved himself the consummate European, writing essays for leading journals in sophisticated German, Italian, and French. Though his reputation never reached the heights that it had in Russia, these essays attracted a highly literate, if small coterie of admirers, including Martin Buber, Ernst Robert Curtius, Charles Du Bos, Gabriel Marcel, and Giovanni Papini."

According to Fr. Constantin Simon, "He was active as a poet and scholar until his very last day. Besides his poetry, Ivanov also wrote tragedies for the theatre on mythological subjects Tantalus and Prometheus, a few prose works, translations of mostly Greek and Italian poetry and literary criticism. His Roman years brought forth his Roman Sonnets (1924) and his Roman Diary (1944)."

According to Fr. Constantin Simon, "His posthumous mystical allegory, Povest' o Svetomire tsareviche: Skazanie starce-inoke (The Tale of Tsarevich Svetomir, as Told by a Holy Monk) is held by some to contain the key to the whole of his artistic life and quest. The Neoplatonic and Nietzschean tones of his earlier work with their essentially pagan philosophy involving successive epiphanies of the Godhead is muted in his later works, in the light of his rediscovered Christian faith."

According to Robert Bird, both Ivanov's 1926 conversion to Catholicism and his decision to isolate himself, "from the main currents of émigré and Soviet life", later helped contribute to, "an image of near-sanctity". Furthermore, "The late reawakening of Ivanov's poetic muse in 1944 serves as an eloquent reminder that, in the final analysis, he remained, first and foremost, a lyric poet held captive by eternity and struggling to define a place in history."

In his 1944 Roman Diary, Ivanov composed poetry that drew upon the traditional feast days as set within the differing liturgical calendars of the Russian and Roman Rites, as well as the Christian theology and spiritual symbols of both traditions, while also pondering the violence and chaos of life in Rome during the Second World War. Copies of the poems Roman Diary contained secretly made their way back to the Soviet Union through the medium of Samizdat, where Eugenia Gertsyk embraced them as the fulfillment of her long standing hopes that Ivanov, like his hero Goethe, "would achieve... clarity and wisdom in old age."

Ivanov died in Rome, after a short illness, in his apartment at three o’clock in the afternoon on 16 July 1949. Although he died a believing Catholic, he had arranged to be buried with two of his poetic heroes, John Keats and Percy Shelley, at the Cimitero Acattolico. Ivanov lies buried not far from the graves of fellow Russian exiles Karl Briullov and Alexander Ivanov.

== Legacy ==
Following his death, the reading of Ivanov's writings continued to be encouraged by C.M. Bowra and Sir Isaiah Berlin, whom he both had met in 1946. Through the influence of both Englishmen, an English translation of Ivanov's book of Dostoevsky scholarship was published as Freedom and the Tragic Life in 1952. Ivanov's final volume of Russian poetry, Svet vechernii ("The Evening Light") was published posthumously in 1962.

In Russian Thinkers, Sir Isaiah Berlin wrote that after Ivan Turgenev, "This search for one's place in the moral and social universe continued as a central tradition in Russian literature virtually until the revolt in the 1890s of the neo-classical Aesthetes and the Symbolists under Ivanov and Balmont, Annensky and Blok. But these movements, splendid as their fruit was, did not last long as an effective force. And the Soviet revolution returned, albeit in a crude and distorted utilitarian form, to the canons of Belinsky and the social criteria of art."

This is why, according to Robert Bird, following Vyacheslav Ivanov's defection with his family to the West, "In the Soviet Union... his works were not republished for decades, and it became inadvisable - if not wholly impossible - to study them. His name became a footnote to other, more 'acceptable' currents in pre-revolutionary literature. With the fall of the Soviet Union, Ivanov became the beneficiary of renewed attention. His books were republished and he has repeatedly been the subject of essays, monographs, and conferences."

In particular, since the fall of Communism, one of the most widely circulated of Ivanov's published writings has been his Russian language commentary on the Christian Bible, which was written in Rome, following his conversion from Russian Orthodoxy to the Russian Greek Catholic Church.

== See also ==
- Vyacheslav Ivanov's work
- Olga Schor

== Sources ==
- Banham, Martin, ed. 1998. The Cambridge Guide to Theatre. Cambridge: Cambridge UP. ISBN 978-0-521-43437-9.
- Billington, James H. 1966. The Icon and the Axe: An Interpretive History of Russian Culture. New York: Random House. ISBN 978-0-394-70846-1.
- Carlson, Marvin. 1993. Theories of the Theatre: A Historical and Critical Survey from the Greeks to the Present. Expanded ed. Ithaca and London: Cornell University Press. ISBN 978-0-8014-8154-3.
- Golub, Spencer. 1998. "Ivanov, Vyacheslav (Ivanovich)." In Banham (1998, 552).
- Hackel, Sergei. 1982. Pearl of Great Price: The Life of Mother Maria Skobtsova, 1891-1945. Crestwood, NY: Saint Vladimir's Seminary P. ISBN 978-0-913836-85-9.
- Kleberg, Lars. 1980. Theatre as Action: Soviet Russian Avant-Garde Aesthetics. Trans. Charles Rougle. New Directions in Theatre. London: Macmillan, 1993. ISBN 978-0-333-56817-0.
- Polivanov, Konstantin. 1994. Anna Akhmatova and Her Circle. Trans. Patricia Beriozkina. Fayetteville: U of Arkansas P. ISBN 978-1-55728-309-2.
- Puskás, Lásló, et al. 2002. Theodore Romzha: His Life, Times, and Martyrdom. Fairfax, VA: Eastern Christian Publications. ISBN 978-1-892278-31-9.
- Rosenthal, Bernice Glatzer. 2004. New Myth, New World: From Nietzsche To Stalinism. University Park, PA: Pennsylvania State UP. ISBN 978-0-271-02533-9.
- Rudnitsky, Konstantin. 1981. Meyerhold the Director. Trans. George Petrov. Ed. Sydney Schultze. Revised translation of Rezhisser Meierkhol'd. Moscow: Academy of Sciences, 1969. ISBN 978-0-88233-313-7.
- ---. 1988. Russian and Soviet Theatre: Tradition and the Avant-Garde. Trans. Roxane Permar. Ed. Lesley Milne. London: Thames and Hudson. ISBN 978-0-500-28195-6. Reprinted as Russian and Soviet Theater, 1905-1932. New York: Abrams.
