= Mystical anarchism =

Russian Symbolist art movement

Mystical anarchism was a tendency within the Russian Symbolist movement after 1906, especially between 1906 and late 1908. It was created and popularized by Georgy Chulkov.

In 1906, Chulkov edited Fakely (Torches), an anthology of Symbolist writing, which called on Russian writers to:

abandon Symbolism and Decadence and move forward to "new mystical experience".

Later in the year Chulkov followed up with a "Mystical Anarchism" manifesto.

The doctrine has been described as:

a mish-mash of Nietzsche, Herzen, Bakunin, Merezhkovsky (Chulkov was a former editor of New Path), Ibsen, Byron, utopian socialism, Tolstoy's Christian anarchism, and Dostoyevsky's rejection of necessity.

Alexander Blok and especially Vyacheslav Ivanov were supportive of the new doctrine while Valery Bryusov, the editor of the leading Symbolist magazine The Balance, and Andrei Bely were opposed to it. The resulting controversy raged on the pages of Russian Symbolist magazines until late 1908.

== See also ==
- Apollon Karelin
- Russian avant-garde

== Bibliography ==
- Glatzer Rosenthal, Bernice (1977). "The Transmutation of the Symbolist Ethos: Mystical Anarchism and the Revolution of 1905". Slavic Review. 36 (4): 608–627. JSTOR 2495266.
- Kaltenbach, Romina (2022). "Russia's Mystical Anarchism: the Case of Aleksej Solonovich (1887-1937)" (PDF). Journal of Comparative Studies. 15 (44): 124–151. ISSN 2592-8279.
- Nalimov, V. V. (2001). "On the History of Mystical Anarchism in Russia". International Journal of Transpersonal Studies. 20. Translated by Yarkho, A. V.: 85–98. doi:10.24972/ijts.2001.20.1.85.
