= Lydia Zinovieva-Annibal =

Russian writer and dramatist

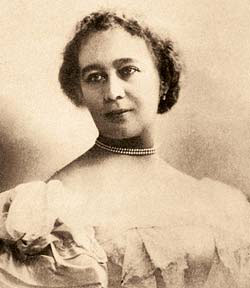
- Born: 17 February 1866; Saint Petersburg, Russian Empire
- Died: 17 October 1907 (aged 41); Saint Petersburg, Russian Empire

Lydia Dmitrievna Zinovieva-Annibal (Russian: Ли́дия Дми́триевна Зино́вьева-Анниба́л; 1866–1907) was a Russian prose writer and dramatist. Annibal was her mother's maiden name.

== Biography ==
She was born into the hereditary Russian nobility. Her grandfather was Senator V.N. Zinoviev, her uncle was General V.V. Zinoviev and her brother, A.D. Zinoviev became the Governor of Saint Petersburg. Her mother was the Baroness Weimar and, through her mother's similar descent from Afro-Russian aristocrat Abram Petrovich Gannibal, Lidia was a distant relation of Russian national poet Alexander Pushkin.

Most of her education was from private tutors. She did attend the Saint Petersburg women's gymnasium for a short time, but was expelled for being "obstinate". In 1884, she married one of her tutors, Konstantin Shvarsalon. Under his influence, she developed an interest in agrarian socialism and became associated with the Narodniks. Clandestine meetings were often held at their home.

In 1893, she separated from her husband and fled to Rome, where she met the poet Vyacheslav Ivanov. Two years later, Ivanov divorced his wife, but her husband refused to consent and their divorce proceedings dragged on for three years. During the 1900s, after returning to Saint Petersburg, she and Ivanov hosted the literary salon "Среды Иванова" (Ivanov Wednesdays, better known as "On the Tower", from its location).

Zinovieva-Annibal was associated with both Russian Symbolism and with the Silver Age of Russian Poetry. Her short novel Tridsat'-tri uroda (Thirty-Three Abominations) was one of the few works of its day to openly discuss lesbianism.

She died of scarlet fever. The location of her grave at Nikolskoe Cemetery has been lost. In 1913, Ivanov remarried Lydia's daughter, Vera, from her marriage with Shvarsalon.

== Works ==
- Torches (1903)
- Rings (1904)
- Thirty-Three Abominations (1907) short novel. Transl. by S. D. Cioran in The Silver Age of Russian Culture.
- The Tragic Menagerie (1907) stories. Transl. by Jane T. Costlow, 1999, Northwestern University Press, ISBN 0810114836
- No! (1918)
