= Myronivka =

City in Kyiv Oblast, Ukraine

Myronivka Миронівка
- City
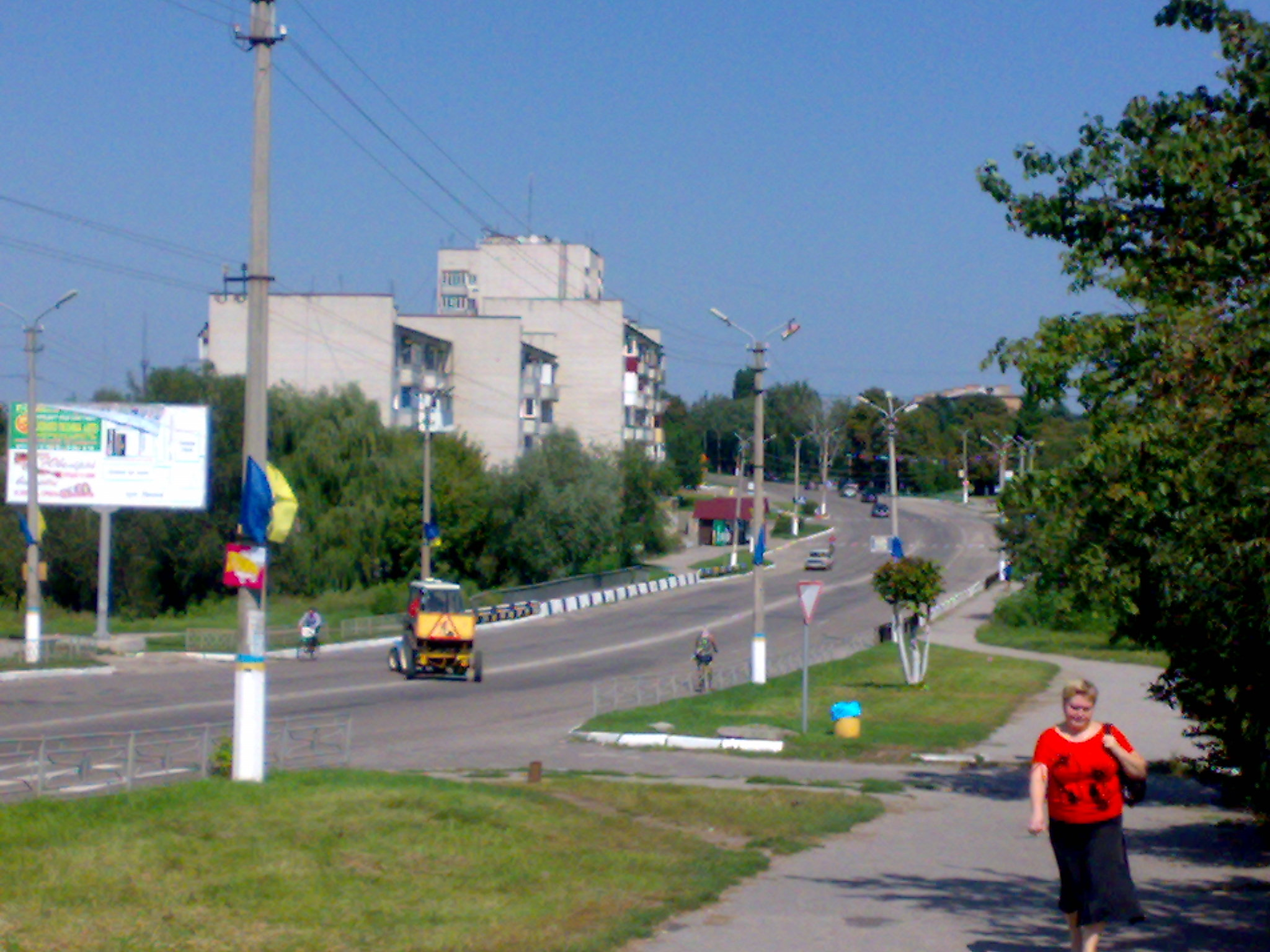
- Central part of Myronivka

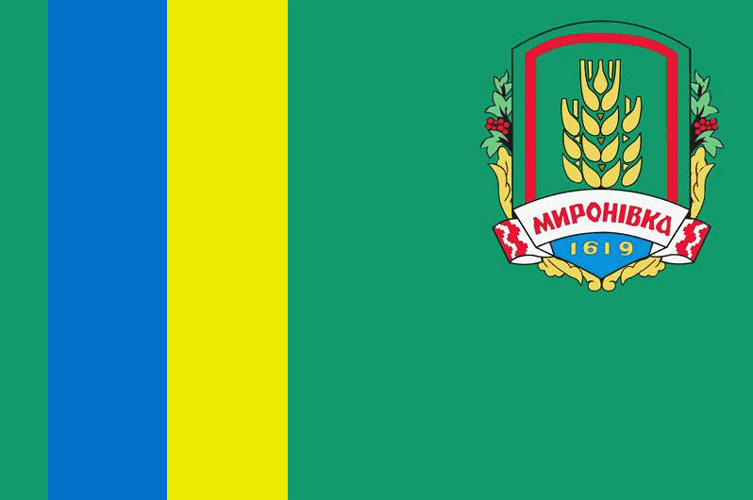
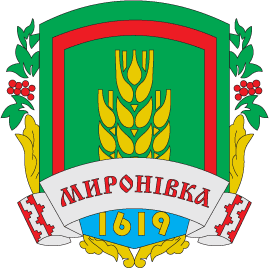
- Flag Coat of arms
- Interactive map of Myronivka
- Location within Kyiv Oblast Location within Ukraine
- Coordinates: 49°39′N 30°59′E
- Country: Ukraine
- Oblast: Kyiv Oblast
- Raion: Obukhiv Raion
- Hromada: Myronivka urban hromada
- Founded: beginning 17th century
- City status: 1968

Area
  - Total: 11.5 km^{2} (4.4 sq mi)
- Elevation: 128 m (420 ft)

Population (2022)
  - Total: 11,103
  - Density: 965/km^{2} (2,500/sq mi)
- Time zone: UTC+2 (EET)
  - Summer (DST): UTC+3 (EEST)
- Postal code: 08800 — 08804
- Area code: +380 4574

Myronivka (Ukrainian: Миронівка, IPA: [mɪˈrɔn⁽ʲ⁾iu̯kɐ]) is a city in Obukhiv Raion in the southeastern portion of Kyiv Oblast, Ukraine. It hosts the administration of Myronivka urban hromada, one of the hromadas of Ukraine. Its population was recorded at 11,103 (2022 estimate).

== Geography ==
Myronivka is located in Central Ukraine along a river valley of Rosava River, a tributary of Ros River. The distance to Kyiv - 106 km. The city has an area of 904 km^{2} (349 mi^{2}). The Ukraine's capital Kyiv is approximately 94 km (58 mi) away from Myronivka.

== History ==
The city traces its history to a settlement established by some Cossack or free settler Myron Zelenyi. In Ukrainian the word Zelenyi means green.

A local historian Leontiy Pokhylevych in his book "The legends about settlements in Kyiv Governorate", published in 1864, wrote, "The village of Myronivka received its name from a free settler Myron Zelenyi. The village consisted (it is then, 130 years ago) of seven ends (kutky) or parts, the actual Myronivka where the church is, Solomakhivka, Nebytivka, Sloboda, Okolotivka, Shafranivka, Rozmarynivka..."

There are other legends, but in the center of each is the same name of a person Myron. Myronivka with the listed above ends was described, as it was mentioned, in 1863–64. In 1740 there were only twenty courtyards (households). In 1749 there was established a church which was opened in 1755. These words were left in his church records by the first priest of Myronivka Sava Chernyakhovsky. Among them, he mentions Myron, who in his definition lived exactly where now from the modern vulytsia Buznitskoho vulytsia Chkalova begins. There is where Myronivka starts.

Most recently the settlement is better known for its Zhdanov collective (kolkhoz) which for quite sometime was headed by Oleksandr Buznytskyi. Before that counts Branicki held here a private sugar factory which operated since 1858.

In 1876 through the village from Fastiv was laid a railway. First public school was opened in 1869.

According to Soviet propaganda almost whole Myronivka was involved in the 1905 Russian Revolution.

In 1911 in Myronivka was established research selection station to analyze harvest and level of sugar in sugar beets.

During the World War I, one third of village population was mobilized to war leading to hardship for the rest of the settlement.

In 1923 Myronivka became an administrative center of the newly created Myronivka Raion which was carved out of Kozyn and Karapyshi volosts. In 1923 the local railroad network was expanded after adding a railway branch between Myronivka and Kaharlyk. The railway hub became even more important later in 1938 when another branch to Kaniv was added.

In Myronivka was also established a state farm and machine-tractor station (MTS).

In the beginning of 1930s there were established two collective farms Stalin and Bilshovyk. During the 1932-1933 Holodomor 700 residents of the village died from starvation.

In 1938 the population of Myronivka grew over 6,000 residents and the settlement was given the status of urban-type settlement. There were built a department store, dinners, etc.

On 6 August 1941 Myronivka was occupied by the German troops after weeks of intense fighting. In the town acted several underground resistance groups supposedly led exclusively by Communists and Komsomol activists. On 31 January 1944 Myronivka was taken back by the Soviet troops of the 54th Fortified District. Over 1,200 residents of Myronivka were mobilized to the Red Army during the Nazi–Soviet War.

In 1950 there was established a big collective farm the Zhdanov kolkhoz uniting Bilshovyk and Budyonnyi arteles and later the Stalin kolkhoz. In 1951 a new train station building was built.

In 1968 Myronivka was granted a city status and the next year the city's sugar factory was awarded the Red Banner of the Ministry of Food Industry of the USSR.

In 1985 in the city was established a memorial complex to the 40th victory anniversary in the Soviet Great Patriotic War.

Until 18 July 2020, Myronivka served as an administrative center of Myronivka Raion. The raion was abolished that day as part of the administrative reform of Ukraine, which reduced the number of raions of Kyiv Oblast to seven. The area of Myronivka Raion was merged into Obukhiv Raion.

== Climate ==
Climate data for Myronivka (1981–2010)
Month	Jan	Feb	Mar	Apr	May	Jun	Jul	Aug	Sep	Oct	Nov	Dec	Year
Mean daily maximum °C (°F)	−1.1 (30.0)	−0.1 (31.8)	5.6 (42.1)	14.3 (57.7)	21.3 (70.3)	24.1 (75.4)	26.4 (79.5)	25.3 (77.5)	19.9 (67.8)	13.0 (55.4)	4.8 (40.6)	0.1 (32.2)	12.8 (55.0)
Daily mean °C (°F)	−3.8 (25.2)	−3.3 (26.1)	1.6 (34.9)	9.0 (48.2)	15.4 (59.7)	18.3 (64.9)	20.4 (68.7)	19.6 (67.3)	14.3 (57.7)	8.3 (46.9)	1.5 (34.7)	−2.4 (27.7)	8.2 (46.8)
Mean daily minimum °C (°F)	−6.4 (20.5)	−6.1 (21.0)	−1.7 (28.9)	4.3 (39.7)	9.7 (49.5)	13.1 (55.6)	14.9 (58.8)	14.0 (57.2)	9.5 (49.1)	4.5 (40.1)	−0.8 (30.6)	−4.8 (23.4)	4.2 (39.6)
Average precipitation mm (inches)	31.8 (1.25)	31.1 (1.22)	31.5 (1.24)	39.4 (1.55)	54.6 (2.15)	86.8 (3.42)	80.0 (3.15)	64.1 (2.52)	58.1 (2.29)	36.0 (1.42)	42.8 (1.69)	38.5 (1.52)	594.7 (23.41)
Average precipitation days (≥ 1.0 mm)	7.6	7.4	7.1	7.2	8.0	9.1	8.9	6.4	7.4	6.1	7.3	7.8	90.3
Average relative humidity (%)	83.5	81.2	76.5	67.4	64.3	71.2	70.8	68.1	73.4	78.8	85.2	86.0	75.5
Source: World Meteorological Organization

== Economy ==
The large produce company "Myronivskyi Khliboprodukt" (English: Myronivka Bread-Produce) has facilities in the town which include poultry production, and animal fodder.

The town is home to a hospital, and is served by a train station which sees dozens of trains daily.

== Gallery ==
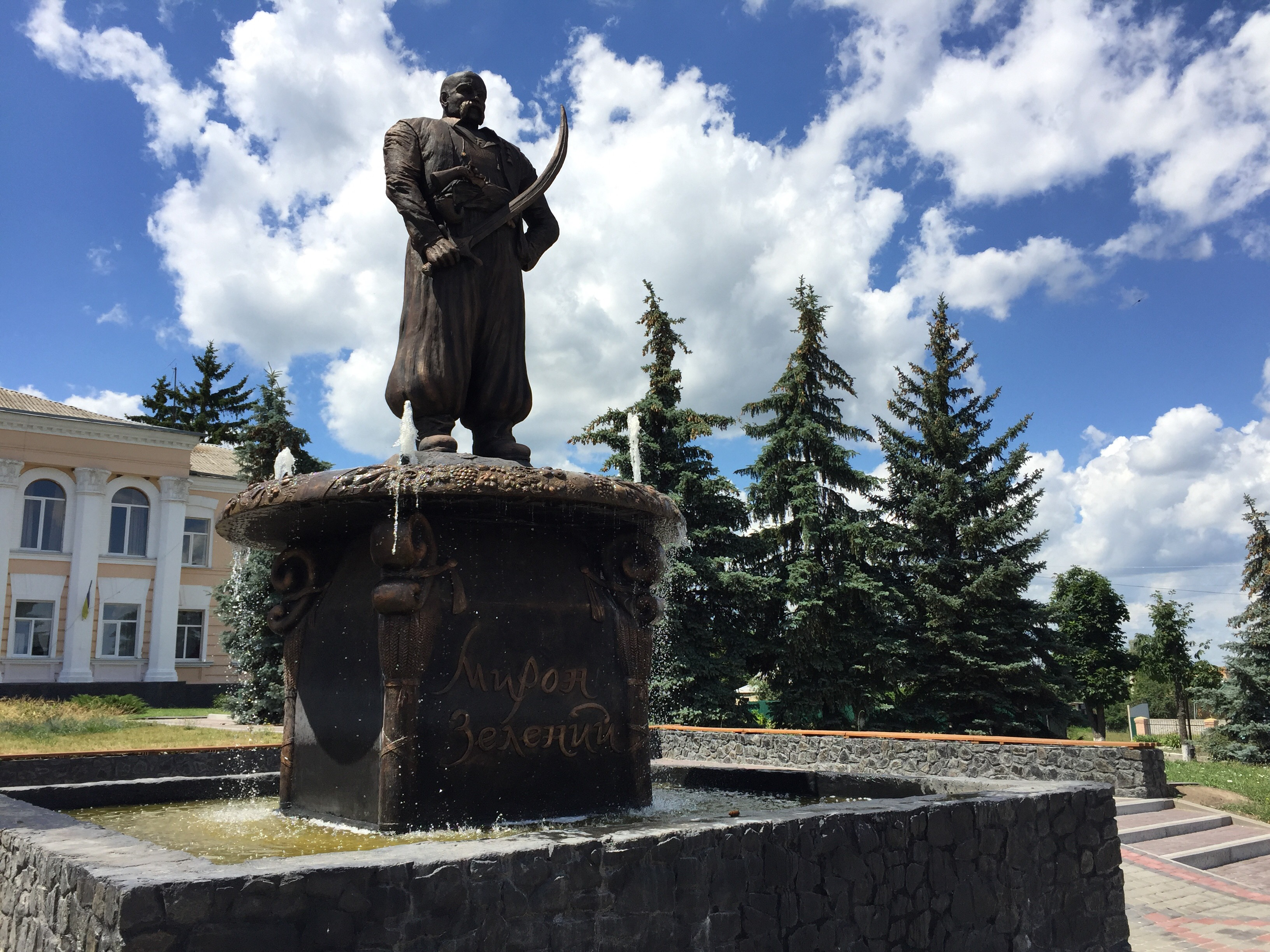
Erected in 2016, a statue of Myron Zelenyi, the settler of the city

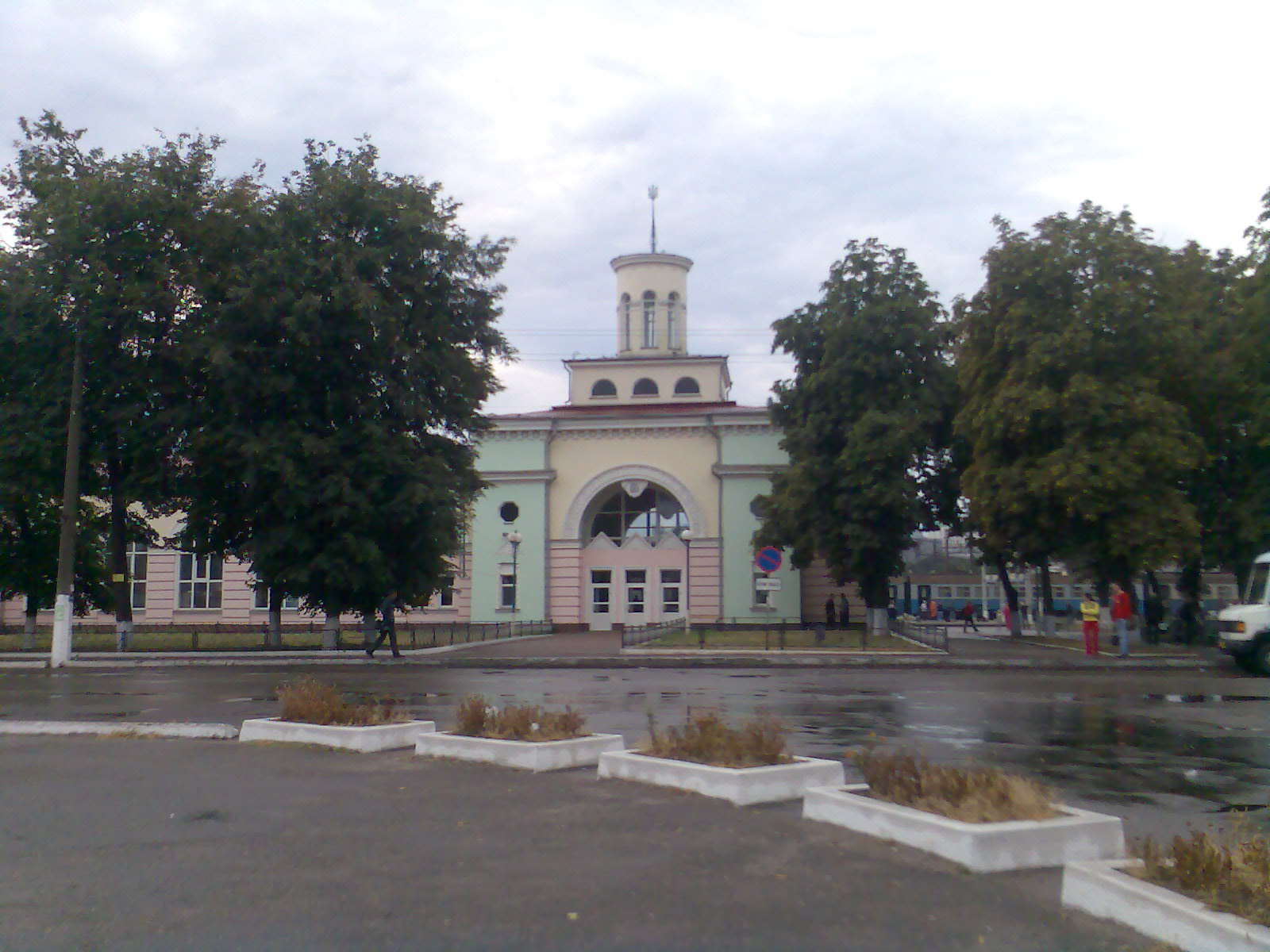
Railway station

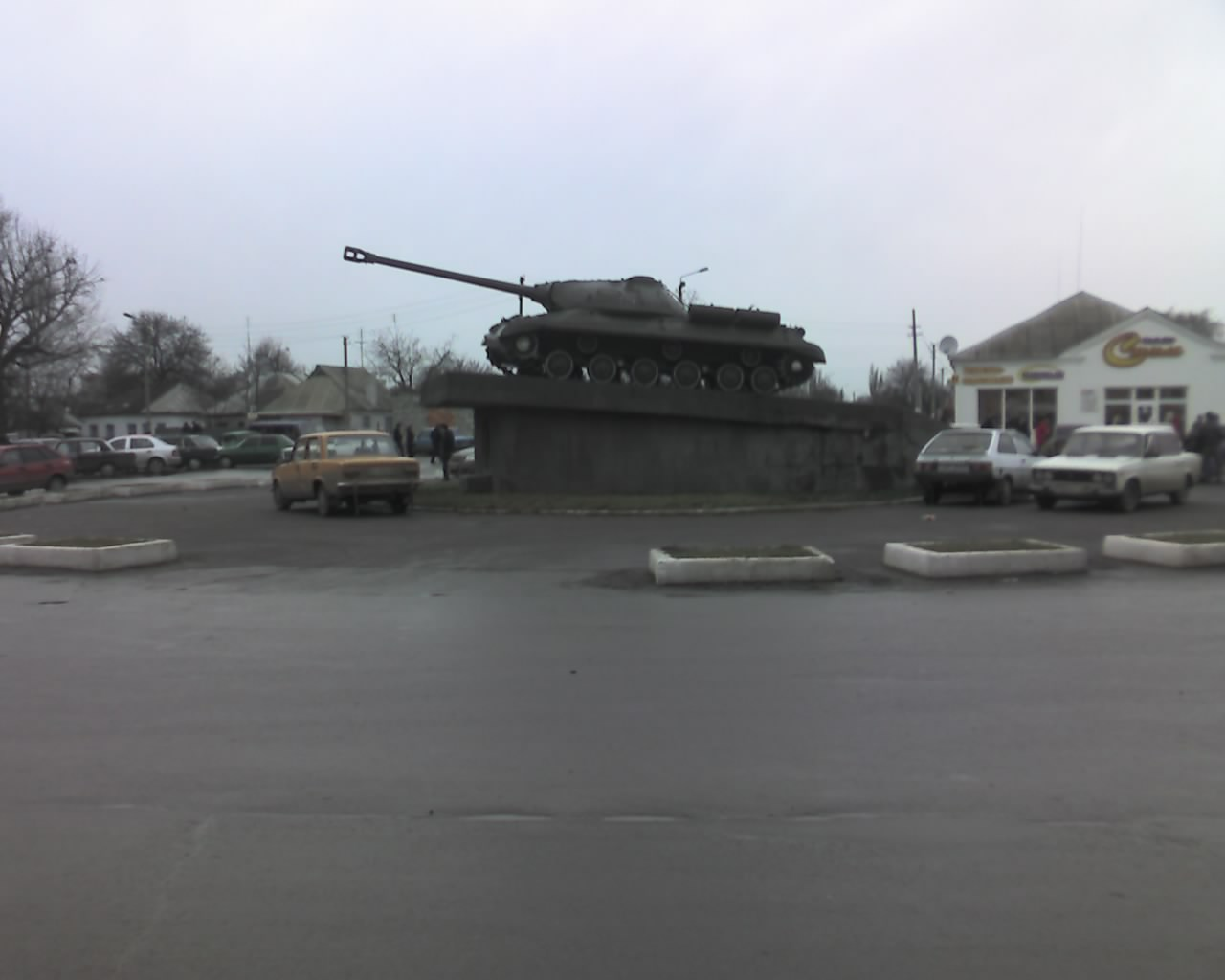
At Central Station

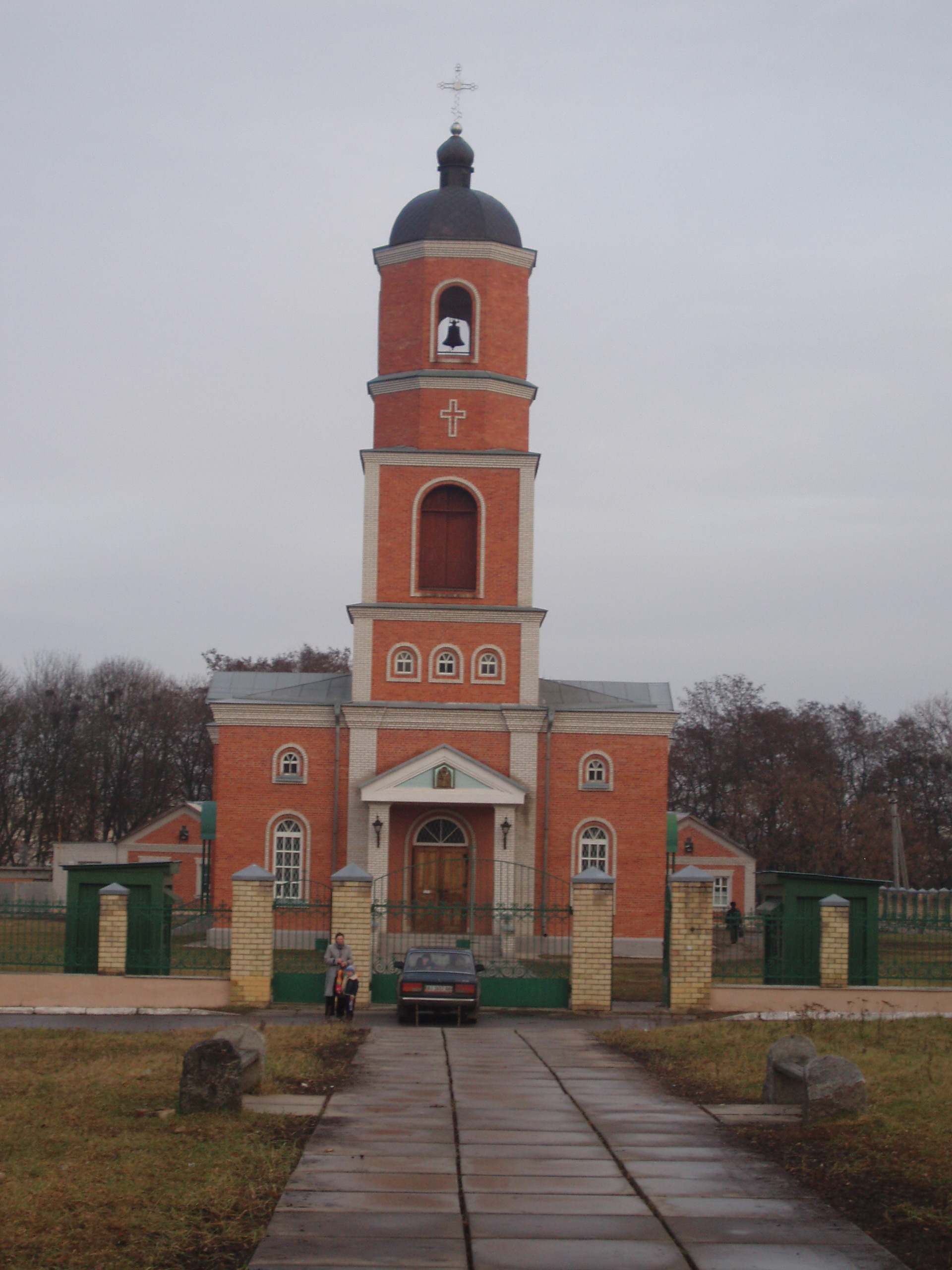
St Michael's Church

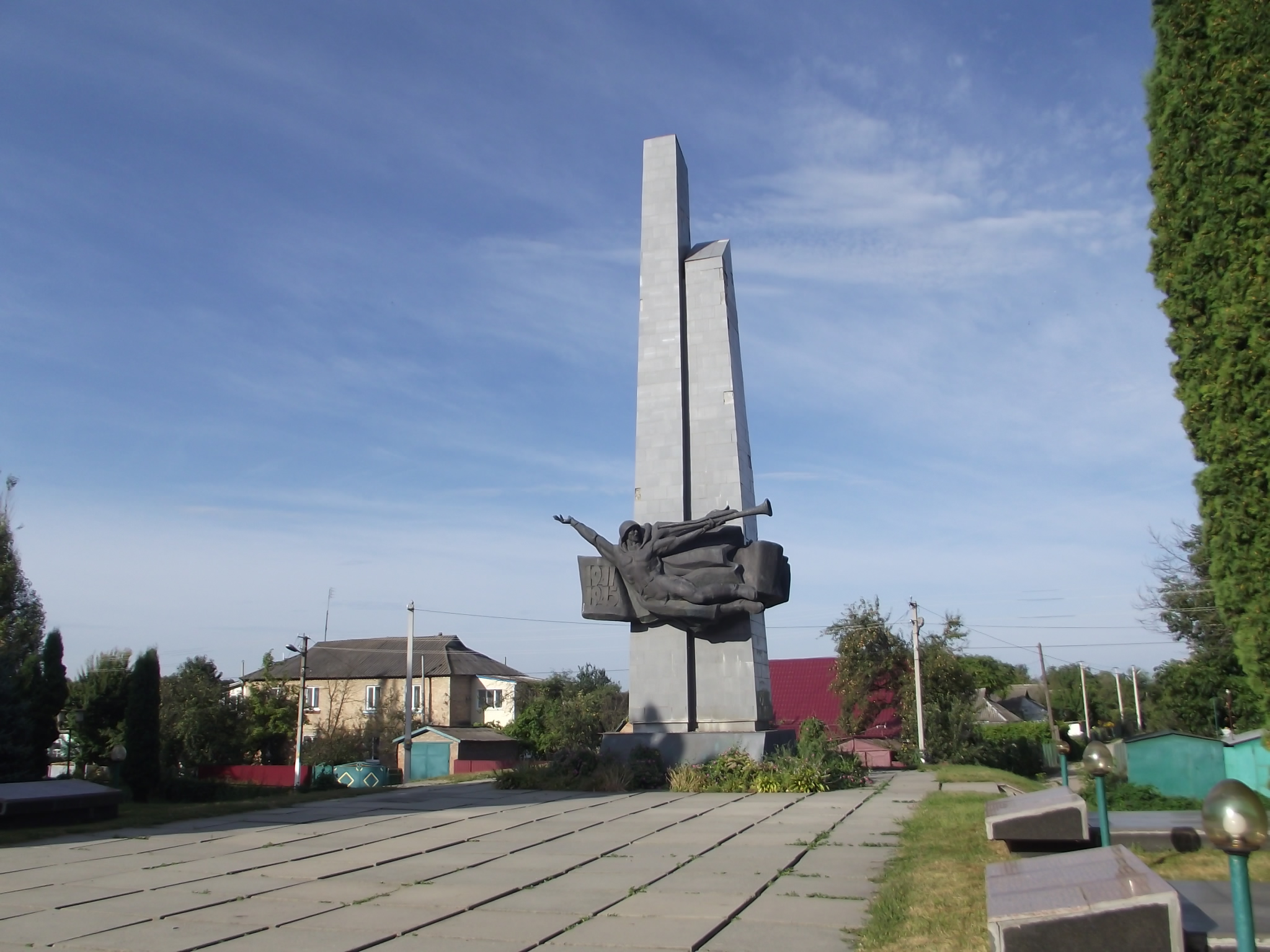
Memorial complex in place of the World War II mass grave

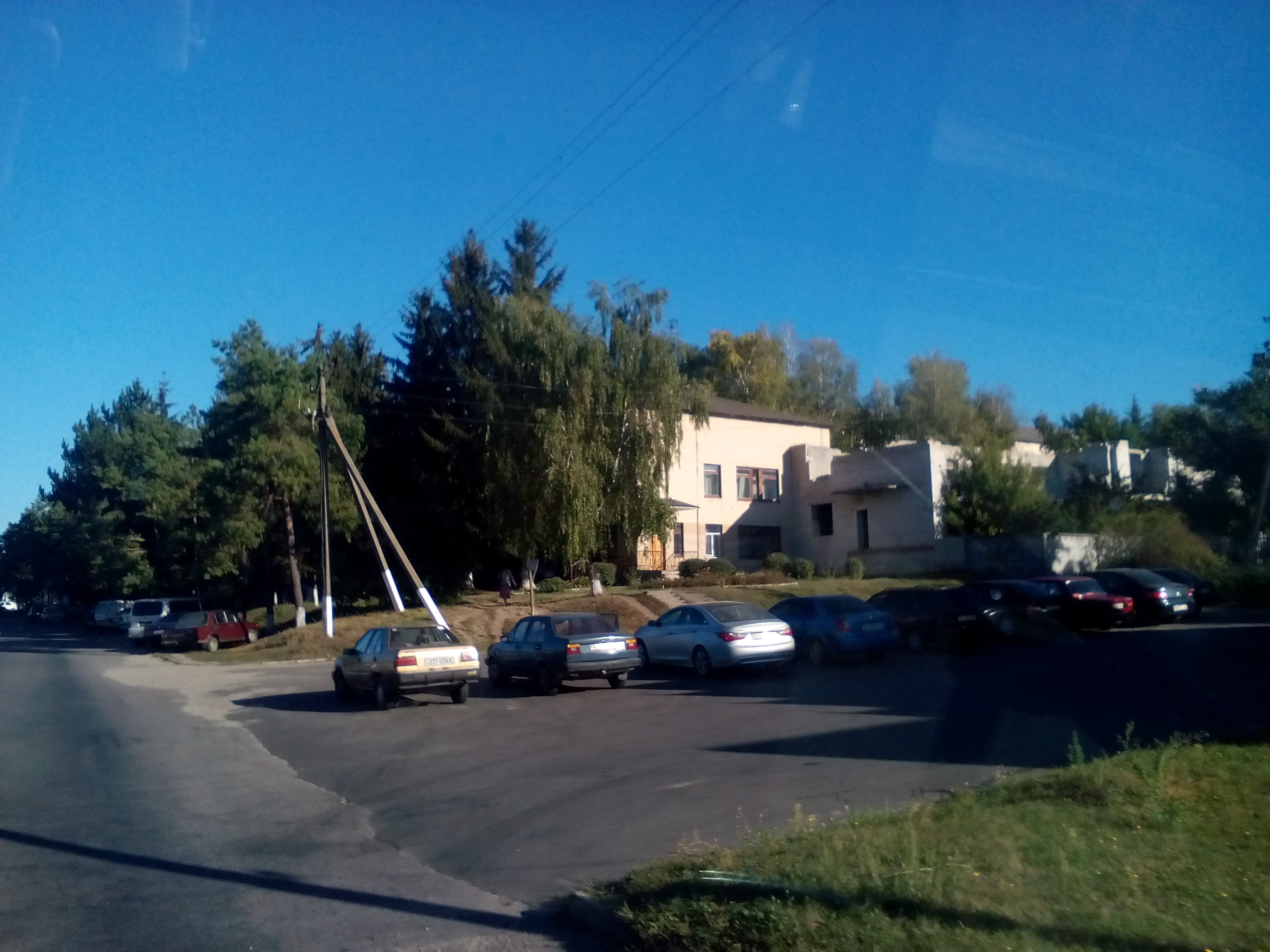
Myronivka Raion hospital
