= Myronivka Raion =

Former subdivision of Kyiv Oblast, Ukraine

Myronivka Raion Миронівський район
- Raion
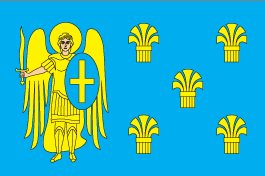
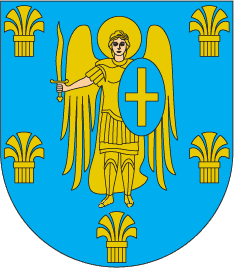
- Flag Coat of arms

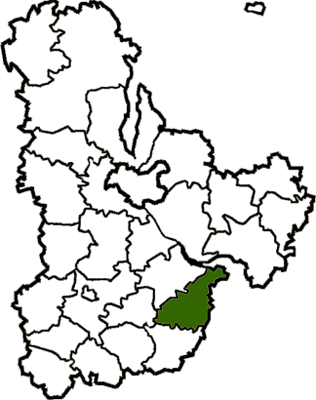
- Coordinates: 49°44′56″N 31°2′21″E
- Country: Ukraine
- Region: Kyiv Oblast
- Disestablished: 18 July 2020
- Admin. center: Myronivka
- Subdivisions: List: — city councils; — settlement councils; — rural councils; Number of localities: — cities; — urban-type settlements; 45 — villages; — rural settlements

Population (2020)
  - Total: 33,114
- Time zone: UTC+02:00 (EET)
  - Summer (DST): UTC+03:00 (EEST)
- Area code: +380

Myronivka Raion (Ukrainian: Миронівський район) was a raion (district) in Kyiv Oblast of Ukraine. Its administrative center was the city of Myronivka. The raion was abolished on 19 July 2020 as part of the administrative reform of Ukraine, which reduced the number of raions of Kyiv Oblast to seven. The area of Myronivka Raion was merged into Obukhiv Raion. The last estimate of the raion population was 33,114 (2020 est.)

At the time of disestablishment, the raion consisted of one hromada, Myronivka urban hromada with the administration in Myronivka.
