= Rosava =

Rosava River
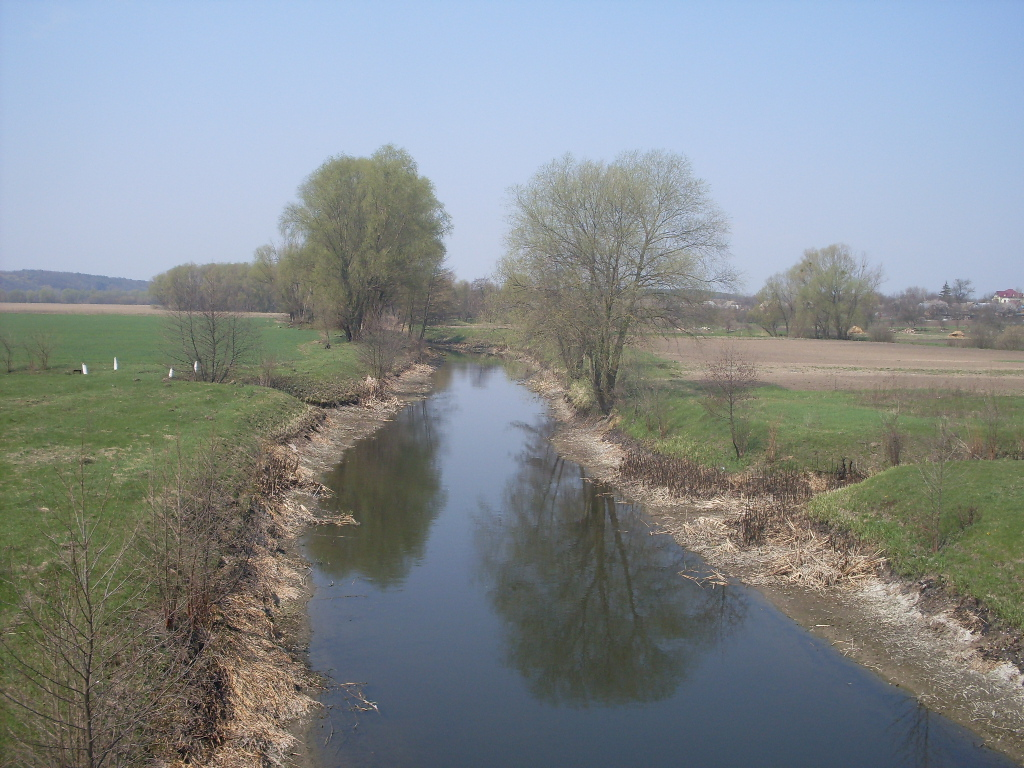
- Rosava near village Hamarnja

Location
- Country: Ukraine

Physical characteristics
- Source
  - location: North from village Rasavka
- Mouth: Ros
  - coordinates: 49°38′05″N 31°27′27″E
- Length: 90 km (56 mi)
- Basin size: 1,720 km^{2} (660 sq mi)

Basin features
- Progression: Ros→ Dnieper→ Dnieper–Bug estuary→ Black Sea

The Rosava (Ukrainian: Росава; Polish: Rosawa) is a river in Ukraine located in the Dnieper Upland, a left-bank tributary of the Ros. It is 90 km long and drains a basin area of 1,720 km². The river flows through Kyiv Oblast and Cherkasy Oblast.

== Cities and towns on the Rosava ==
- Kaharlyk
- Myronivka
