= 2020 Kaharlyk police rape =

Incident in Ukraine

The 2020 Kaharlyk police rape took place in May 2020 in Ukraine, garnering extensive media coverage. On May 23, 2020, police officers in the town of Kaharlyk in Kyiv Oblast (province) tortured and raped a woman who was being kept in police custody. The event caused a public outcry.

== Events ==
On May 23, two police officers took a witness to the theft, a local woman born in 1994, to the police station.

On the night of May 24, an operative in his office tortured a woman. He put a gas mask on her head, handcuffed her and fired a pistol over the woman's head, after which he raped her several times. She was beaten and raped several times in the ward, and the next day the woman went to the local hospital.

In addition, police used physical force on a man who was also in the department. Threatening him with rape, they brought him to his knees, beat him on the head with a rubber truncheon, put on a gas mask, and fired a pistol over his head. As a result, the victim's ribs and nose were broken.

== People involved ==
The suspects are two police officers. The victim was a woman born in 1994.

== Investigation and court sentences ==
Criminal proceedings have been instituted under Art. 152 of the Criminal Code of Ukraine. On May 25, two police officers were detained and placed in a pre-trial detention center. DBR investigators prepared suspicions for them. They are charged with "Rape", "Torture" and "Excess of power or official authority by a law enforcement officer". The DBR demands arrest without the possibility of bail.

In May 2020 the Verkhovna Rada (Ukraine's national parliament) Committee on Law Enforcement Plans plans to consider the case in closed session, the stated reason was the inadmissibility of disclosing information about the case.

On June 22, the Kyiv Court of Appeals remanded the suspected police officers in custody for at least July 22. The suspects were forcibly taken biomaterial for examination. The arrested deny their guilt.

On July 2, suspicions of torture and rape were handed over to two other police officers from Kaharlyk, one of whom was an operative of the same police station. The DBR explained that after the start of the investigation, they received complaints about other facts of torture in this police station.

On July 3, the Holosiivskyi District Court of Kyiv chose a measure of restraint for two more employees of the Kaharlyk branch suspected of torture.

On September 11, DBR representatives stated that almost all examinations in the case had been completed, and that the materials should be submitted to the court in the near future.

In September 2021 of the five suspects Mykola Kuziv and Serhiy Sulima were in custody; Serhiy Panasenko, Yaroslav Levadniuk and Yevhen Trokhimenko were under house arrest.

On May 24, 2023, Mykola Kuziv and Serhiy Sulima were sentenced to 11 years in prison each by the Obukhiv Raion Court. The two defendants were found guilty of all articles of the indictment. The National Police of Ukraine was ordered to pay 1.296 million hryvnias in damages to the victim.

== Response ==
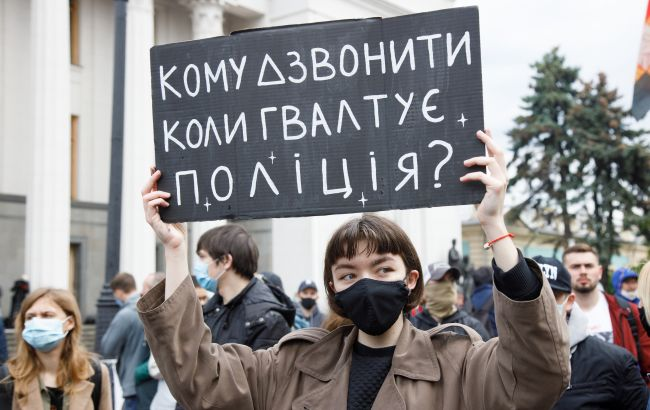
June 2020 protest calling for the dismissal of Minister of Internal Affairs Arsen Avakov

Representatives of the regional police department headed by Dmytro Lytvyn, the assistant chief of the GUNP, were sent to Kaharlyk to act as the chief of the local police. All personnel of the police department were removed from the staff for further certification of each employee. Instead, Interior Ministry officials ruled out mass re-certification of police officers after the tragedy. Ukraine's Minister of Internal Affairs Arsen Avakov deputy Anton Herashchenko explained it that "mass re-certifications can let bad people forward, and good - to dismiss for biased reasons". In addition, Herashchenko said that the resignation of Avakov, as head of the ministry, which causes so much criticism, "is not justified." About 60 employees of the department were laid off, instead it was planned to recruit new police officers. On June 4, Kaharlyk's police force was completely reduced. 4 employees fired, 5 suspended and 10 disciplined.
