= Bohuslav Raion =

Former subdivision of Kyiv Oblast, Ukraine

Coordinates: 49°32′48″N 30°52′22″E

Bohuslav Raion Богуславський район
- Raion
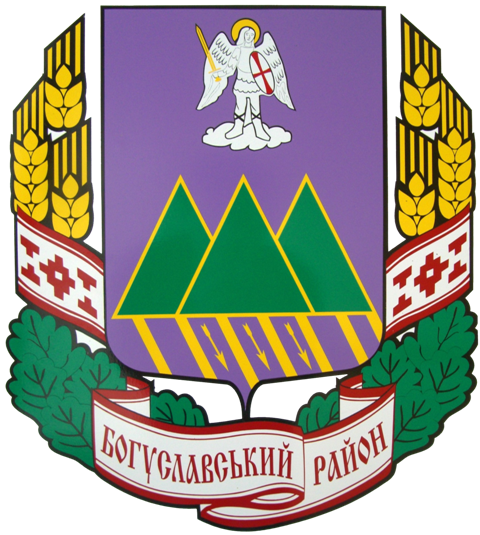
- Flag Coat of arms

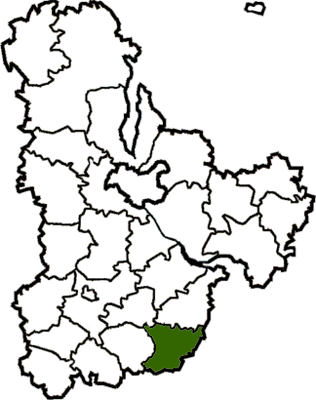
- Country: Ukraine
- Region: Kyiv Oblast
- Disestablished: 18 July 2020
- Admin. center: Bohuslav
- Subdivisions: List: — city councils; — settlement councils; — rural councils; Number of localities: — cities; — urban-type settlements; 40 — villages; — rural settlements

Population (2020)
  - Total: 33,318
- Time zone: UTC+02:00 (EET)
  - Summer (DST): UTC+03:00 (EEST)
- Area code: +380

Bohuslav Raion (Ukrainian: Богуславський район) was a raion (district) in Kyiv Oblast of Ukraine. Its administrative center was the city of Bohuslav. The raion was abolished on 18 July 2020 as part of the administrative reform of Ukraine, which reduced the number of raions of Kyiv Oblast to seven. The area of Bohuslav Raion was split between Bila Tserkva and Obukhiv Raions. The last estimate of the raion population was 33,318 (2020 est.).

== Subdivisions ==
At the time of disestablishment, the raion consisted of two hromadas,

- Bohuslav urban hromada with the administration in the city of Bohuslav, transferred to Obukhiv Raion;
- Medvyn rural hromada with the administration in the selo of Medvyn, transferred to Bila Tserkva Raion.

Bohuslav raion consisted of 1 city (Bohuslav), and 40 villages. The villages of Bohuslav raion included:

- Biivtsi
- Borodani
- Brane Pole
- Chaiky
- Deshky
- Dibrivka
- Dmytrenky
- Dybyntsi
- Huta
- Isaiky
- Ivanivka
- Ivky
- Kalynivka
- Karandyntsi
- Khokhitva
- Koriakivka
- Krasnohorodka
- Kydanivka
- Liutari
- Medvyn
- Moskalenky
- Mykhailivka
- Mysailivka
- Mytaivka
- Oleksiivka
- Poberezhka
- Polovetske
- Potashnia
- Rozkopantsi
- Savarka
- Scherbashyntsi
- Semyhory
- Shupyky
- Sofiika
- Synytsia
- Teptiivka
- Tunyky
- Vilkhovets
- Yatsiuky
- Zakutyntsi
