= Kaharlyk Raion =

Former subdivision of Kyiv Oblast, Ukraine

Kaharlyk Raion Кагарлицький район
- Raion
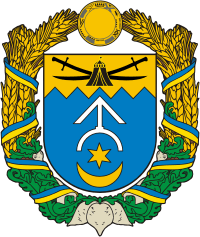
- Flag Coat of arms

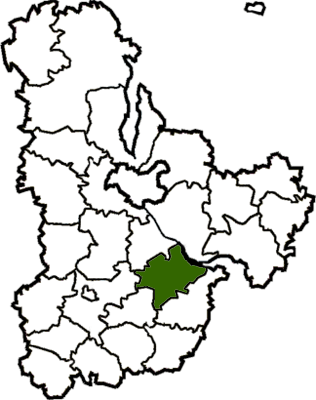
- Coordinates: 49°54′31″N 30°50′15″E
- Country: Ukraine
- Region: Kyiv Oblast
- Disestablished: 18 July 2020
- Admin. center: Kaharlyk
- Subdivisions: List: — city councils; — settlement councils; — rural councils; Number of localities: — cities; — urban-type settlements; 49 — villages; — rural settlements

Population (2020)
  - Total: 32,346
- Time zone: UTC+02:00 (EET)
  - Summer (DST): UTC+03:00 (EEST)
- Area code: +380

Kaharlyk Raion (Ukrainian: Кагарлицький район) was a raion (district) in Kyiv Oblast of Ukraine. Its administrative center was the city of Kaharlyk. The raion was abolished on 18 July 2020 as part of the administrative reform of Ukraine, which reduced the number of raions in Kyiv Oblast to seven. The area of Kaharlyk Raion was merged into Obukhiv Raion. The last estimate of the raion population was 32,346 (2020 est.).

At the time of disestablishment, the raion consisted of one hromada, Kaharlyk urban hromada with the administration in Kaharlyk.
