= Kaharlyk (novel) =

2014 novel by Oleg Shynkarenko

- First edition (Ukrainian)
- Author: Oleg Shynkarenko
- Original title: Кагарлик
- Cover artist: Andry Honcharuk
- Language: Ukrainian
- Genre: satirical dystopia
- Publisher: Serhiiy Pantiuk Publishing House 2014 (first edition), Liuta Sprava (Fierce Business) Publishing House, 2015 (second edition)
- Publication date: 2014, 2015
- Publication place: Ukraine
- Media type: Print (Hardcover)
- Pages: 206 pp

Kaharlyk (The name of a little town Kaharlyk next to Kyiv) is a Ukrainian satirical dystopia novel by Oleg Shynkarenko, first published in hardcover by Serhii Pantiuk Publishing House in 2014. The novel depicts life in Ukraine a hundred years after the present time. Ukraine returned to the Middle Ages because of consequences of Russian occupation. The main character Olexandr Sahaidachny, whose mind was used for creation of Russian military satellites's supercomputers, is trying to get back his lost memory and wife. For this, he embarks on a mysterious city Kaharlyk, where time stopped after testing the newest Russian weapons.

== Story of the novel's creation ==
The novel was started on December 12, 2012, as a Facebook page, where author published 100 words – messages from parallel reality of a future – every day. The project has been planned as multimedia one. The author recorded several music fragments in concrete music genre for it, using instead of musical instruments sounds of surrounding reality (such as knocks at the washing machine, fridge, radiator, pans, coffee mill electric motor, Serbian orthodox chorals fragments etc.) united in absurd collages to illustrate storyline.

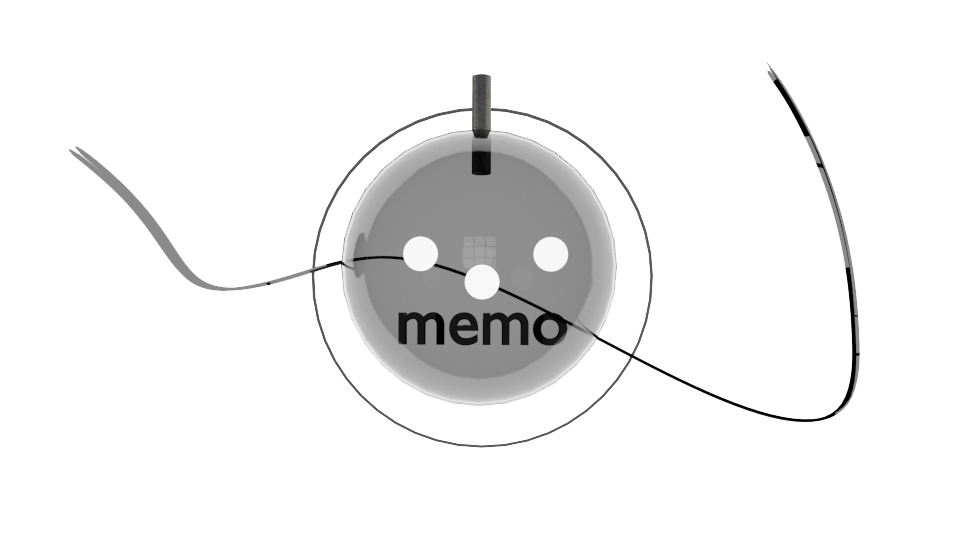
Memory's block. Picture from "Kaharlyk".

== Plot summary ==
The plot unfolds in 2114 year or 100 after Euromaidan and Russian invasion in Ukraine. The local population in Ukraine is in the medieval state. The main character Olexander Sahaidachny recovers consciousness in a house at the edge of Kyiv. He feels almost full loss of his memory and remembers just one that he needs to find his wife Olena immediately. Sahaydachnyi hopes that his memory will turn back together with his wife.

In the same house, he meets Birgir Hansen, unknown person who knows something about his past and suggests finding his wife in a little town Kaharlyk (next to Kyiv), besides Birgir hints to the fact that the outside world is changed in a peculiar way and it is very difficult to survive there.

Out in the street, Olexander meets a Kaharlyk inhabitant old man Petro and he agreed to take him to his house and even shelter there. Sahaydachnyi unsuccessfully tries to find his wife, but found just some evidences of Russian occupation in old newspapers. Soon old man Petro dies. Sahaydachnyi finds on the road badly wounded orthodox fundamentalist Mikhail Kalashnikov. Dying Kalashnikov asks Olexander to back-up his mind in the special device “morphone” before his death and suggests to find Olena in Kyiv.

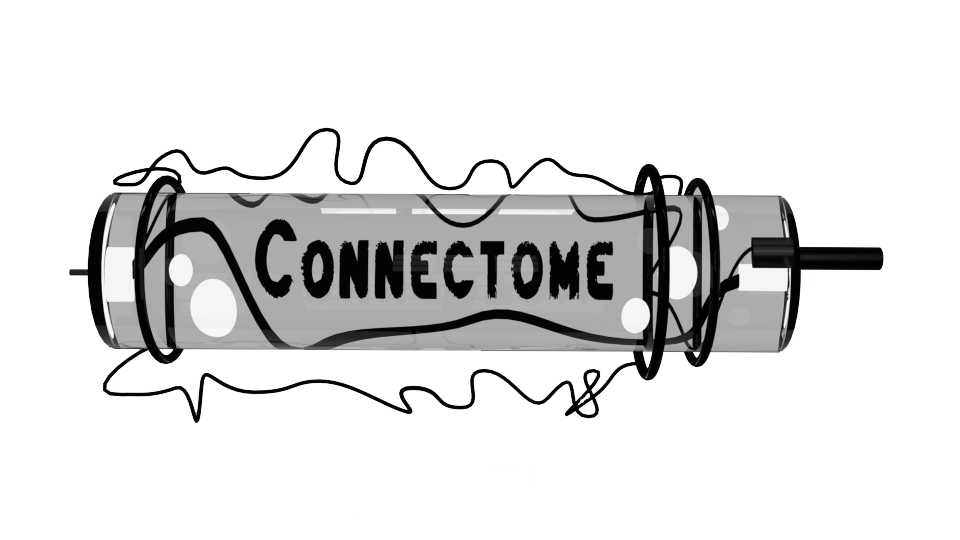
Connectome. Picture from "Kaharlyk".

Kyiv is a devastated city with 2500 people. Sahaydachnyi meets priest Andryi there. Andryi professes a special kind of religion and believes that God is hiding on the Earth amongst beggars and refuses to rule this world. Together with Andryi they go in disturbed by war supermarket, where ancient morphones with long before died people are piled. The supermarket dweller major Hryhorenko together with priest Andryi try listening to old morphones establish what year is it now. Some people who want to seize with food remains constantly attack the dwelling of Hryhorenko. One of them kills major and the killer is immediately murdered by a mysterious creature – Russian military satellite armed with nuclear laser, which states that its mind was copied from Olexander Sahaydachnyi mind. Priest Andryi persuades Sahaydachnyi to stay in Kyiv, but he decides to come back in Kaharlyk to search Olena there.

Russian military satellite is in the opposition to the power in Moscow and doesn't execute its orders. It says that he is going to save Olexander Sahaydachnyi and convey him to the civilized world. It established a special foundation for the purpose and hired Birgir Hansen to go in Ukraine. But he refused to convey Sahaydachnyi at once and decided firstly to explore folklore traditions which emerged around Kaharlyk, where time has stopped forever owing to Russian military experiments. Leaving Kyiv Sahaydachnyi meets Birgir again. He says Olexander that is going to folklore expedition in Kaharlyk, so they are going there together.

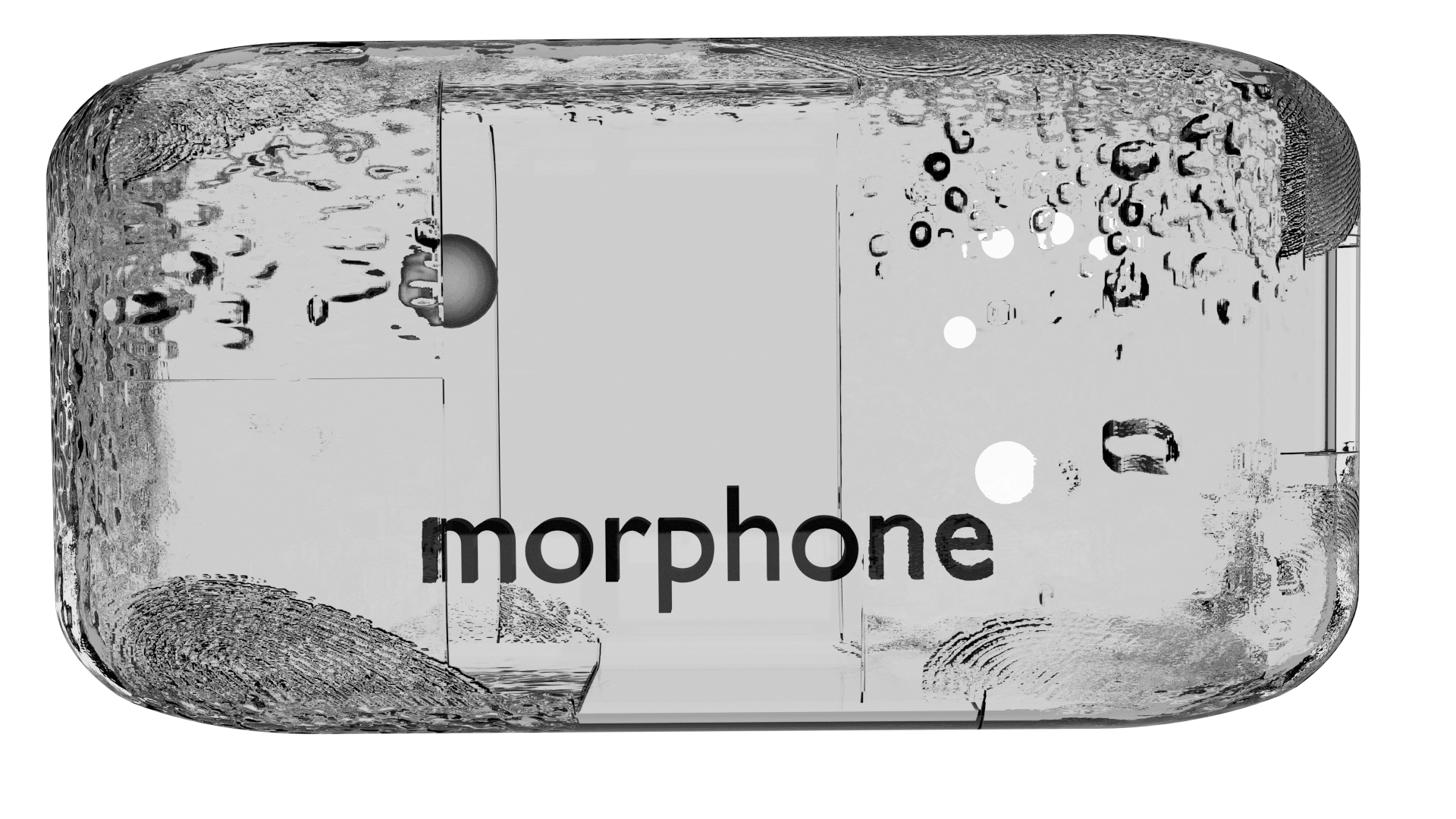
Morphone. Picture from "Kaharlyk".

The first village on the road was Lisnyky where space-time anomalies considerably influence life of its people. Birgir tells Olexander the story of his previous life: after going to Ukraine he was busy with terraforming of the Mars watching over a nuclear power plant which melted Mars polar cap. It was a dull work, so he went to Ukraine for adventures and exiting experience. The next village on the road to Kaharlyk is Hodosivka. Its people were tortured by a peculiar religious cult. Next village Romankiv was completely under the ground. Its people hid there from Russian occupation, but stayed there even after the war was finished. In Obuhiv village people exist dottedly periodically appearing from other times.

Russian military satellite “Yuri Gagarin” was in the near-earth geostationary orbit and its mind was copied from Olexander Sahaydachnyi mind too, but Gagarin was fully loyal to the power in Moscow. It made an attempt to eliminate real Sahaydachnyi on the road between Obuhiv and Kaharlyk, but missed the mark because of strong space-time anomalies. The shot led to elimination of Yuri Gagarin itself.

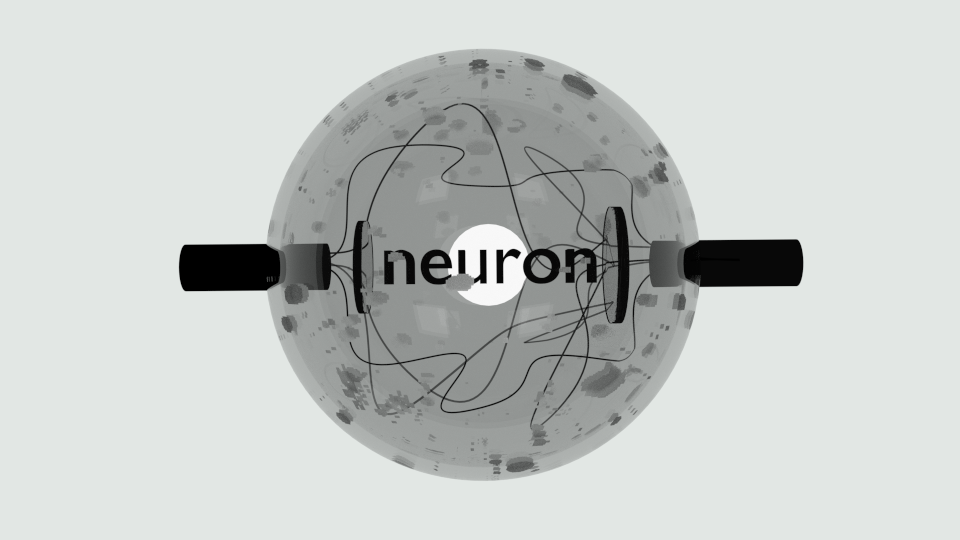
Neuron. Picture from "Kaharlyk".

In Kaharlyk Olexander meets Olena, a 50-year-old woman. He thinks that she is his missed wife and her age is explained by time anomalies of the town. Olena tells that she was searching for her husband too, but says that Olexander is not like him. Though Olena agrees to consider Olexander as her husband, because she is not sure due to her weak memory.

Birgir suggests Sahaydachnyi to go abroad at least, but he refuses, because wants to put Ukraine in order. He is going to write a novel about his adventures. Suddenly on the edge of the town he notices inscription on the wall “Kontraktova Square 12 Olena”. It is a place in Kyiv so it gives him hope that real Olena could wait for him in Kyiv and Olexander sets out there again.

== Main topics of the novel ==
- Impossibility of an adequate mind's copy, because of constant and unforeseen original's changes.
- Critics of aggressive semantic monopoly as an attempt to determine the only version of any sense with the help of brutal force.
- Distrust to a suggested version of the reality and, as a consequence, - constant search of its alternative.

== Reception ==
Andrey Kurkov "Book discoveries-2014 of the famous book lovers" Chytomo

Oleh Shynkarenko's novel "Kaharlyk" feature a prose assembled from many one-hundred-words units and best of all suited to the understanding of the "hologram-novel", a novel that consists of artfully carved puzzles which a reader has to collect in a complete picture of a fictional life invented by the author.

Mykhaylo Brynych "Just a little and there will be Kaharlyk" Litaccent

"The novel despite its small size is stuffed with many interesting ideas and their combination even pretends to absolute originality..."

"They grow potatoes at the Independence Square in Kyiv, ruins of "Achan" supermarket are bequeathed as a legacy like a patrimonial castle, several insane contenders to the Kyiv mayor position are trying to shoot down each others".

"in details, concerning Russian-Ukrainian war, to say the author makes an impression of well trained Baba Vanga is putting it mildly. One would like to spit long and exhausting over his left shoulder (as a token from hex) when he runs across predictions which during the last months became a part of our history".

== English translation ==
Steven Komarnitskyj plans to translate the novel till the August 2016 and publish it in Great Britain. A large excerpt from the novel was published by Index of Censorship in July 2016 issue.

== See also ==
- List of Ukrainian-language writers
- Ukrainian literature

== Notes ==
A novel written on Facebook during the Euromaidan protests will be published in English

War, in pieces: Ukrainian protest literature

Dystopian Ukraine novel, written on Facebook during protests, gets English translation

Oleg Shynkarenko: "It was a surprise for me that Babay from my novel is already in Ukraine" (interview with the author at "Lyuta Sprava" publishing house internet site)

Ukraine's executed renaissance and a kickstarter for one of its modern successors
