= Bohuslav =

City in Kyiv Oblast, Ukraine

Bohuslav Богуслав
- City
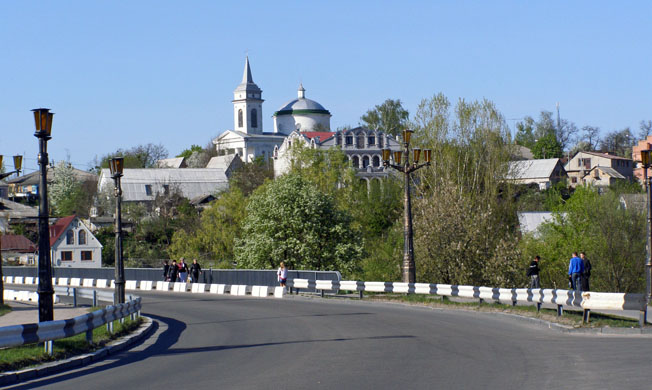
- Skyline of Bohuslav across the Ros River

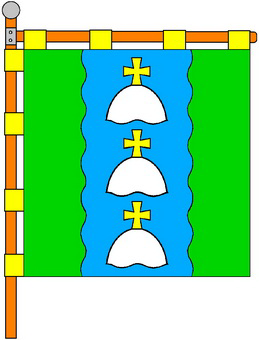
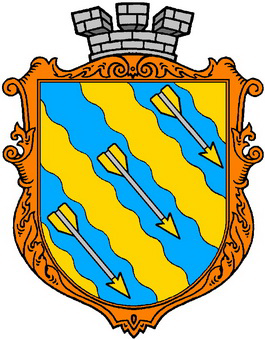
- Flag Coat of arms
- Interactive map of Bohuslav
- Location of Bohuslav in Ukraine Bohuslav (Ukraine)
- Coordinates: 49°32′48″N 30°52′22″E
- Country: Ukraine
- Oblast: Kyiv Oblast
- Raion: Obukhiv Raion
- Hromada: Bohuslav urban hromada
- First mentioned: 1032

Area
  - Total: 16 km^{2} (6.2 sq mi)

Population (2022)
  - Total: 15,789
  - Density: 990/km^{2} (2,600/sq mi)
- Time zone: UTC+2 (EET)
  - Summer (DST): UTC+3 (EEST)
- Postal code: 09700 — 09702
- Area code(s): +380 4561

Bohuslav (Ukrainian: Богуслав, IPA: [boɦʊˈslɑu̯]) is a city on the Ros River in Obukhiv Raion, Kyiv Oblast, Ukraine. It hosts the administration of Bohuslav urban hromada, one of the hromadas of Ukraine. Population: 15,789 (2022 estimate); 17,135 (2001).

== Name ==
It is known as Boslov (Yiddish: באָסלעוו) by some of its Yiddish speaking residents and as Boguslav by the Russophones.

== History ==
The city's year of establishment and source of name is uncertain. It is mentioned by Hypatian Codex as early as 1032 which is assumed as the year of its foundation. In official documents it is mentioned in 1195 when Bohuslav was handed over by the Grand Prince of Kyiv Rurik II to the Grand Prince of Vladimir-Suzdal Vsevolod III who preceded him on Kyivan throne several years earlier.

In 1240 Bohuslav was destroyed by the Mongol invasion. In 1362 it was liberated by forces of the Grand Duchy of Lithuania. The settlement was later invaded by the Tatars and many inhabitants were taken into slavery. It was eventually rebuilt and repopulated and Sigismund II Augustus issued a renovation privilege.

In 1569 Bohuslav was passed to the Kingdom of Poland. By decree of King Sigismund III Vasa, in 1591, Bohuslav became the seat of a starostwo and was bestowed upon Janusz Ostrogski, the voivode of Volhynia. To encourage people to settle in the town, Sigismund III Vasa exempted the town from taxes for 29 years and established weekly markets and annual fairs. In 1620, King Sigismund III Vasa confirmed old privileges and granted new trading and brewing privileges, and granted Magdeburg rights and a city banner. After 1622, starosts of Bohuslav were Field Crown Hetman Marcin Kazanowski and voivode of Bratslav Aleksander Dominik Kazanowski.

From 1648 to 1667 it was part of the Cossack Hetmanate and after the Treaty of Andrusovo was once again returned to Poland. In 1674, the town was seized by Hetman of Left-bank Ukraine Ivan Samoylovych and Grigory Romodanovsky. In 1678, it was destroyed by Turkish-Tatar-Cossack forces. In 1685 it was occupied by Samiylo Samus whom Ivan Mazepa appointed Hetman of Right-bank Ukraine when Poland allowed to restore Cossacks' liberties. In 1685, settlers from Bohuslav founded Alexeyevka in Sloboda Ukraine.

Since that time and until 1704 Bohuslav became a residence of the appointed Hetman. In 1704 Samus surrendered his authority to Mazepa. After withdrawal of the Russian armed forces in 1708 from Poland, Samus continued to self-govern unlawfully in the region. In 1711 he joined forces with Pylyp Orlyk, however after a number of unsuccessful storms of Bila Tserkva, Orlyk withdrew to Moldova. Samus was left to defend Bohuslav on his own now against the united armies of Russia and Poland (bound by the Treaty of Narva). In 1712 Samus was arrested and exiled to Siberia. Bohuslav regiment was liquidated and the city was returned once again under the Polish administration.

It was a royal town of Poland. Afterwards local starosts included lieutenant general Teodor Hieronim Lubomirski, Great Crown Hetman Jan Klemens Branicki, and Marshal of the Court of the Crown and Royal Chamberlain Franciszek Rzewuski. In 1787, Polish King Stanisław August Poniatowski met with envoy of the Kingdom of Naples in the town.

After the Second Partition of Poland (1793) the city was passed to the Russian Empire and until 1837 it was a center of Bohuslav county. The county was restored once again after the establishment of the Soviet regime in 1919 and 1923 it was transformed into the Bohuslav Raion.

It had a large Jewish community. According to the 1897 census, on a total of 11,372 inhabitants, 7445 people were Jews whose community was destroyed in the Holocaust. During World War II, Bohuslav was occupied by Germany from July 1941 to February 1944.

Until 18 July 2020, Bohuslav was the administrative center of Bohuslav Raion. The raion was abolished that day as part of the administrative reform of Ukraine, which reduced the number of raions of Kyiv Oblast to seven. The area of Bohuslav Raion was split between Bila Tserkva and Obukhiv raions, with Bohuslav being transferred to Obukhiv Raion.

== Economy ==
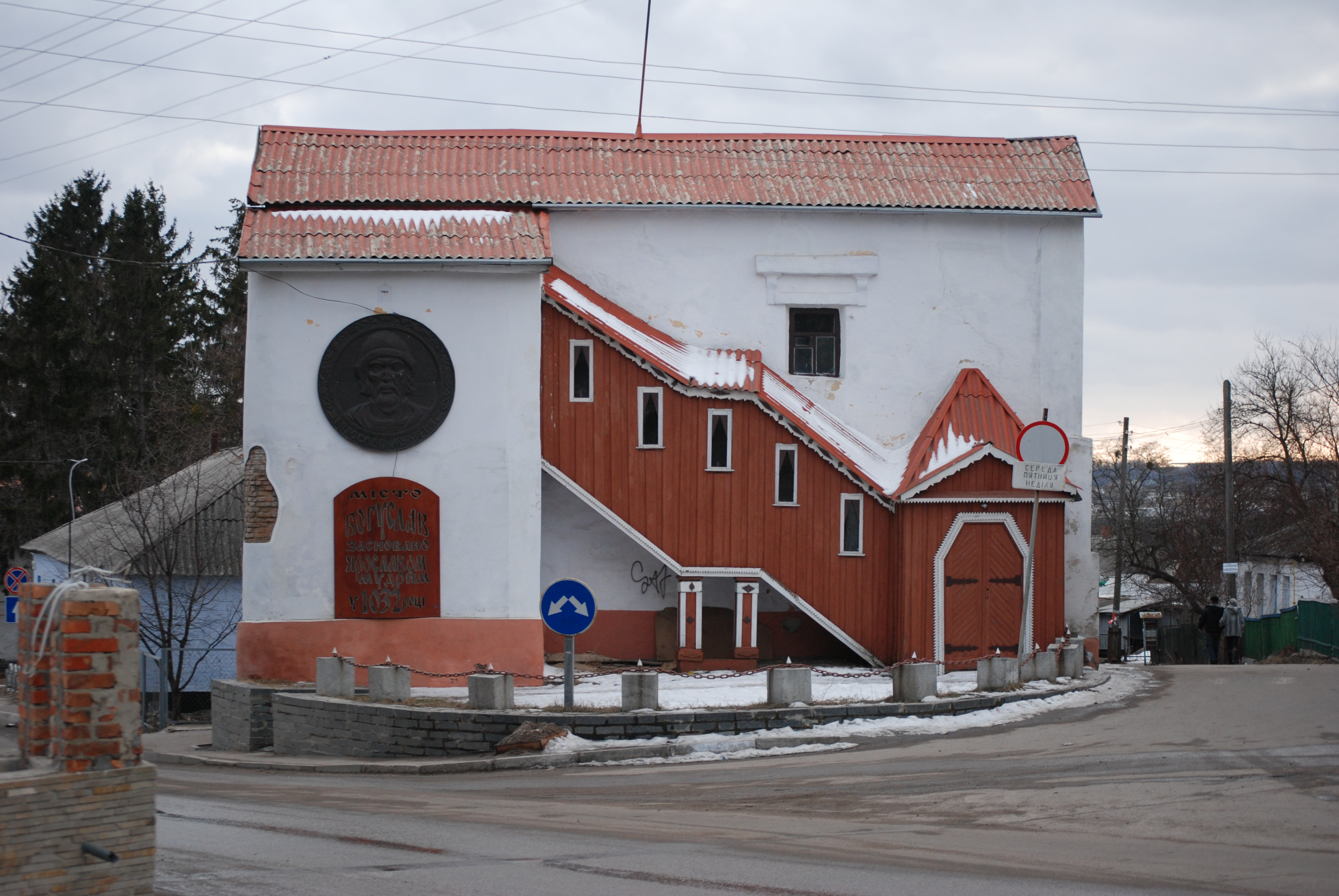
Museum of Decorative and Applied Arts, building from 1726

Bohuslav has been historically known as a centre of textile industry and granite production.

== Landmarks ==
- Former heder locally known as "kamianytsia" built in 1726 is the oldest building in the city. During the Soviet times it was transformed into a club for deaf and mute at first and after World War II into the museum of Komsomol Glory. Today it is a museum of decorative art.

== Notable people ==
- Marusia Bohuslavka, legendary Ukrainian freedom fighter.
- Neonila Lahodiuk, Ukrainian jazz composer, pianist and music teacher, Merited Artist of Ukraine
- Ivan Soshenko, Ukrainian painter, contemporary and close friend of Taras Shevchenko
- Hélène Sparrow, Polish medical doctor and bacteriologist
- Herman Toll, United States congressman Prominent Americans who trace their family roots to Bohuslav include the late Congressman Herman Toll (1907–1967), who emigrated from the region with his family around 1910, and his nephews Robert (Bob) and Bruce Toll, founders of publicly traded homebuilder Toll Brothers.
- Olexandra Tymoshenko, 1992 Olympic champion
- Мikhail Sukernik (1902 - 1981) Soviet, Russian - Ukrainian Chemist who contributed to the publication of the first Russian - Yiddish Dictionary that was published in Moscow, USSR after his death in 1984. He helped with preserving materials and supported the discovery of the original meanings of the words. He worked with the authors of the dictionary Shulman Shapiro, M.A. and Spivack, I.

== Gallery ==
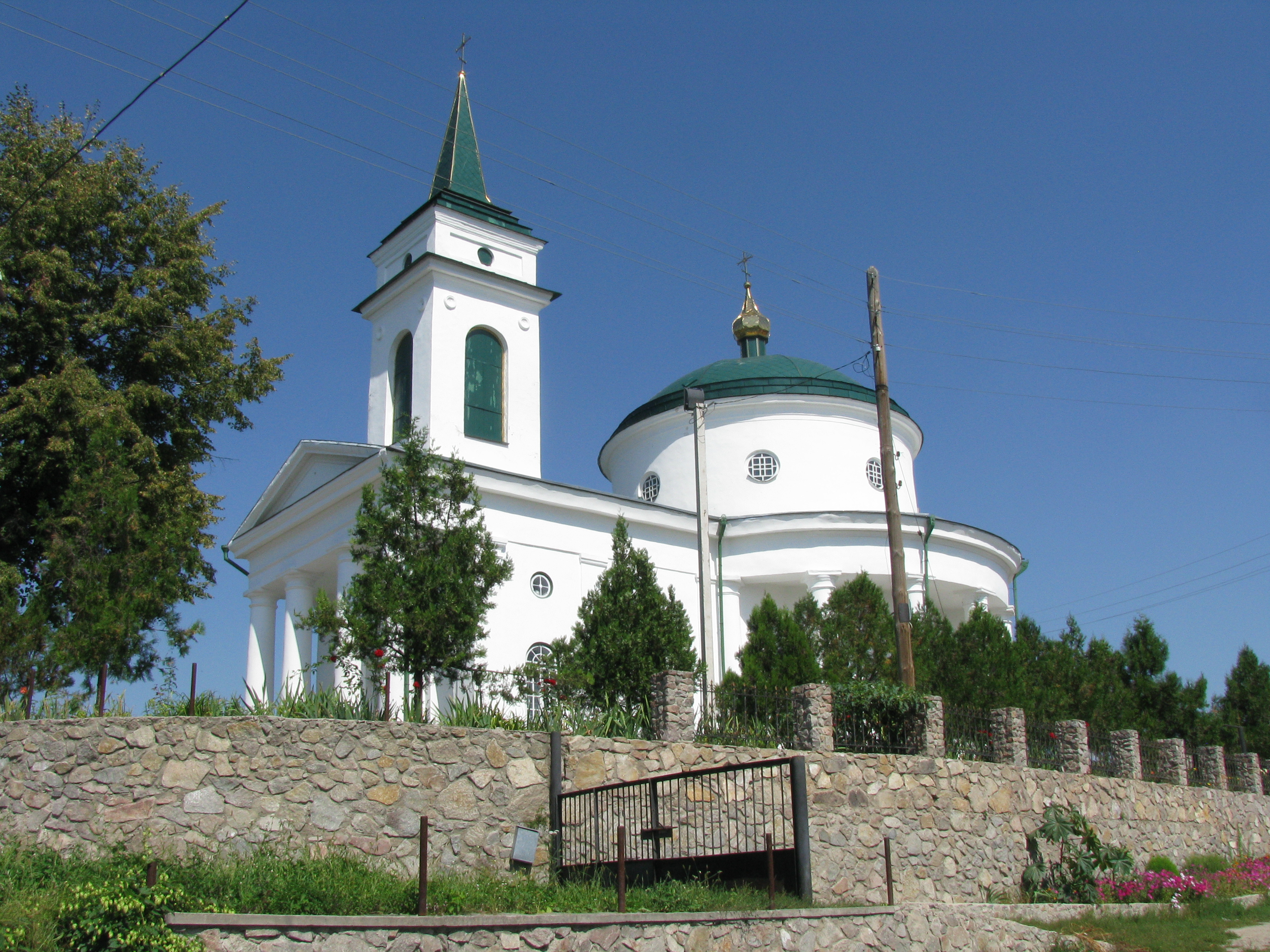
Trinity Church

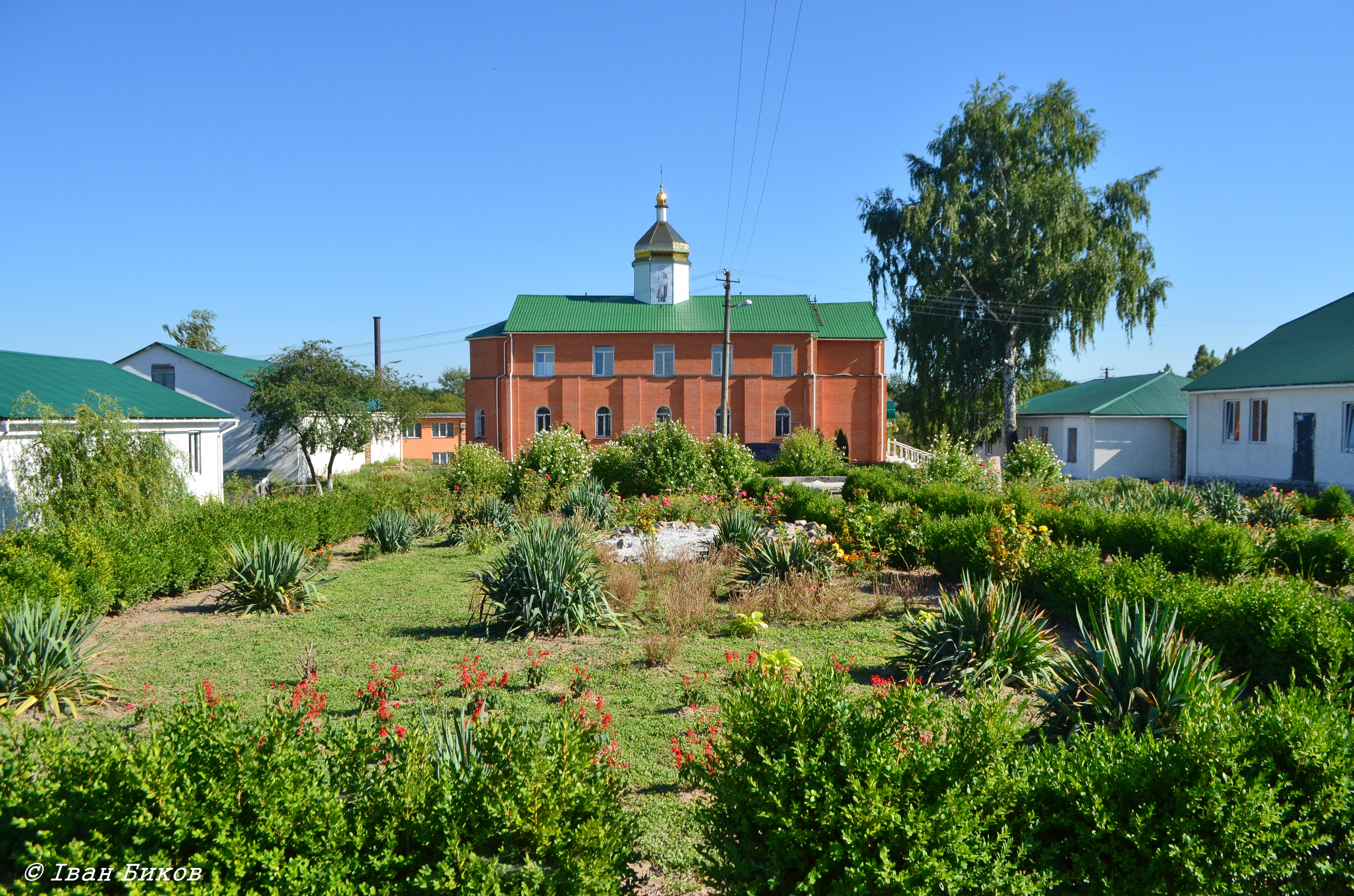
St Nicholas Monastery

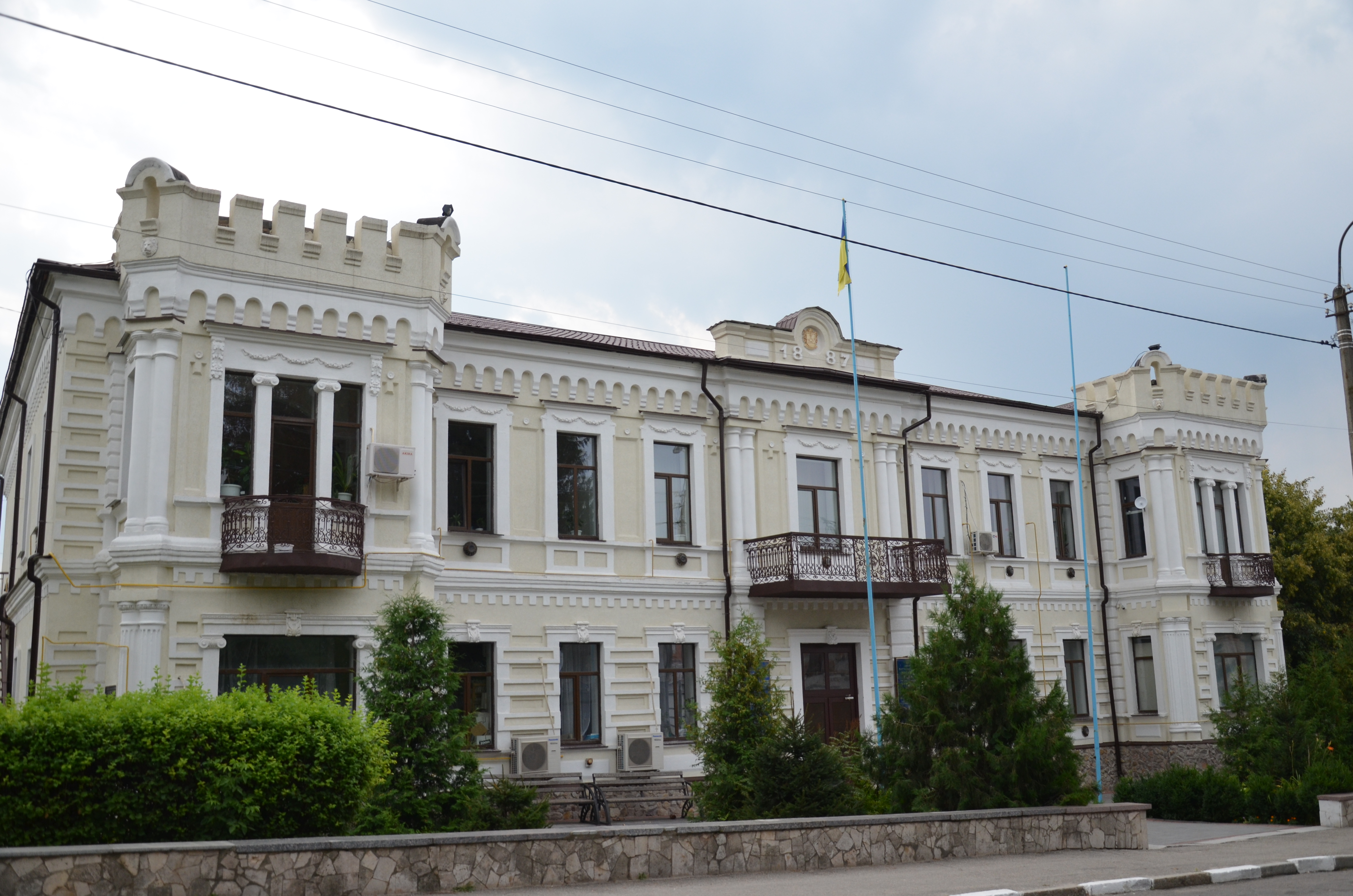
Town hall

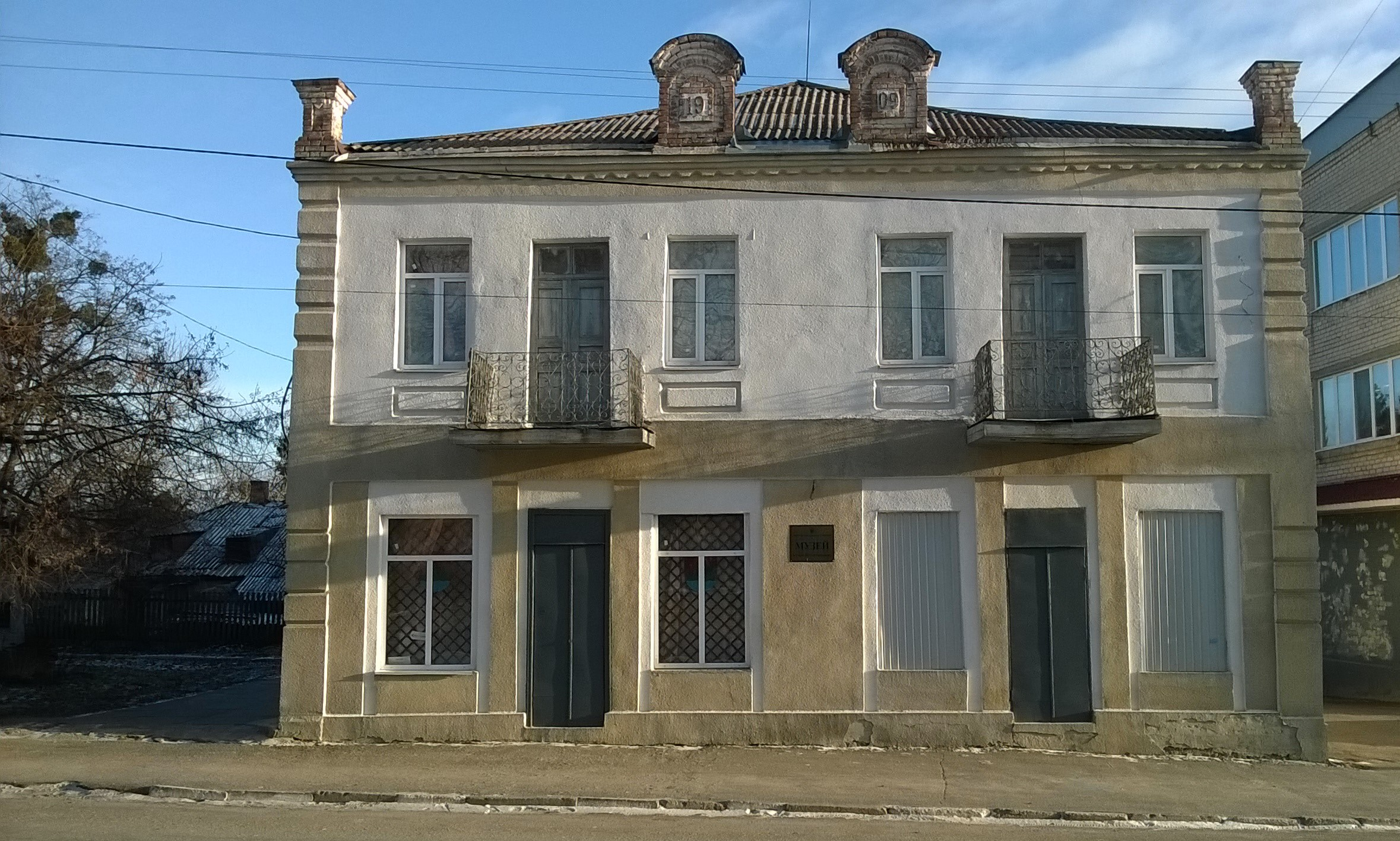
Local history museum

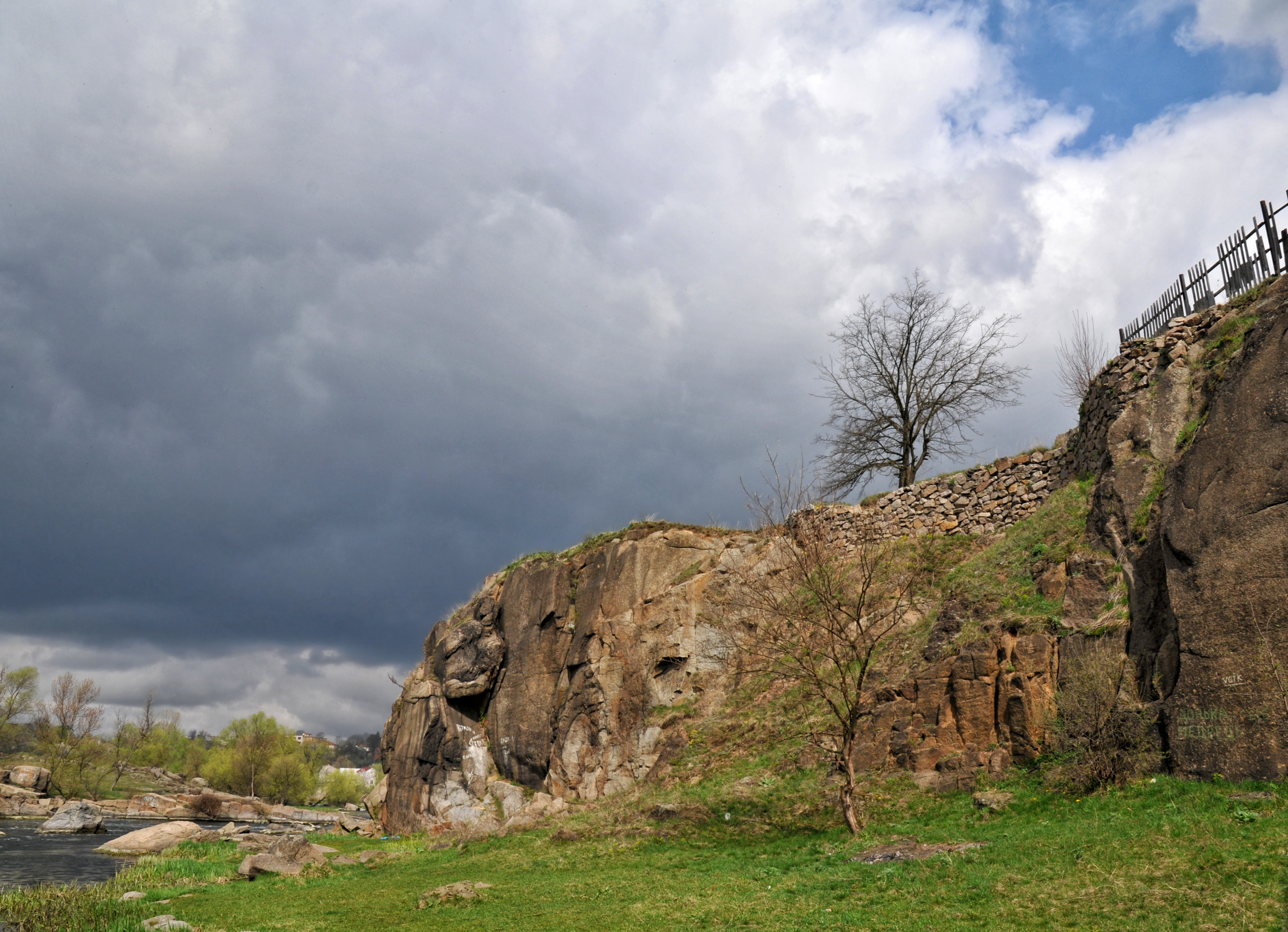
Granite banks of Ros river in Bohuslav
