= Ukrainka, Kyiv Oblast =

City in Kyiv Oblast, Ukraine

Ukrainka Українка
- City
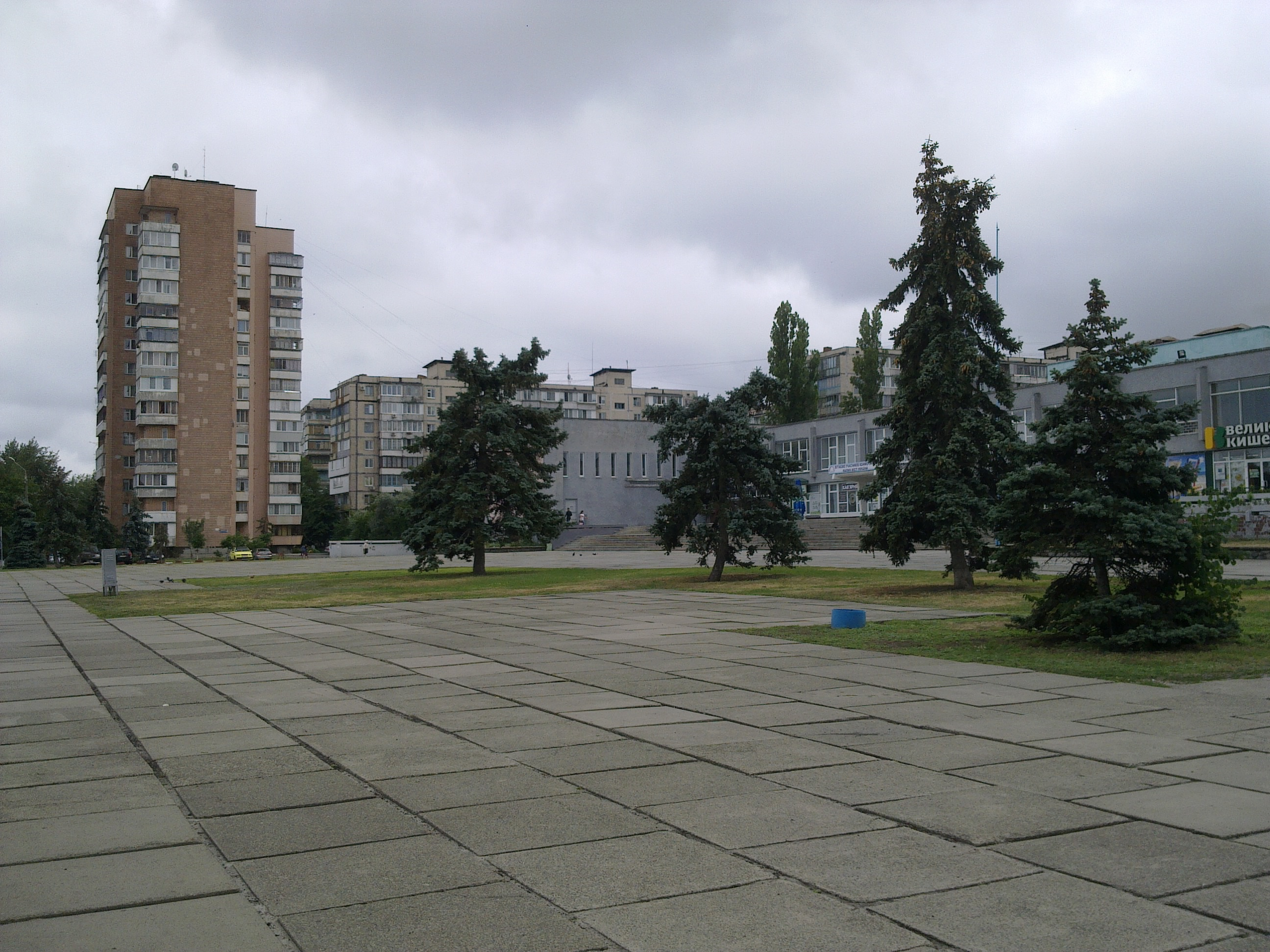
- Mykoly Krasnoshtana Square

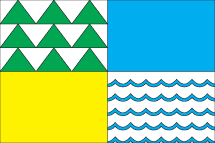
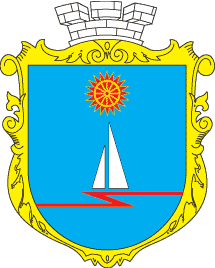
- Flag Coat of arms
- Interactive map of Ukrainka
- Location of Ukrainka, Kyiv Oblast Ukrainka (Kyiv Oblast)
- Coordinates: 50°9′11.11″N 30°44′36.57″E
- Country: Ukraine
- Oblast: Kyiv Oblast
- Raion: Obukhiv Raion
- Hromada: Ukrainka urban hromada
- First written mention: 5 March 1541
- City rights: 19 November 1979

Area
  - Total: 5.91 km^{2} (2.28 sq mi)

Population (2001)
  - Total: 14,163
- Postal code: 08720
- Area code: +380 4572
- Website: http://www.ukrainka.org/

Ukrainka (Ukrainian: Українка, IPA: [ʊkrɐˈjinkɐ]) is a city in Obukhiv Raion, Kyiv Oblast (province) of Ukraine. It hosts the administration of Ukrainka urban hromada, one of the hromadas of Ukraine. Ukrainka has a population of 16,081 (2022 estimate). In 2001, the population was 14,163.

Since 2010, Ukrainka hosts the International Video Art and Short Film festival "VAU-Fest", held annually in the summer.

== Demographics ==
As of the Ukrainian national census in 2001, Ukrainka counted a population of 13,978 inhabitants. In terms of ethnic groups living in the city, Ukrainians make up a very large majority, followed by a very significant Russian minority. A notable Belarusian community also dwells in the city, as well as a small number of ethnic Poles, and a Muslim Tatar community. The exact ethnic composition was as follows:

Ethnic groups in Ukrainka
	percent
Ukrainians	77.78%
Russians	19.85%
Belarusians	0.92%
Poles	0.21%
Tatars	0.21%
Armenians	0.11%
others	0.92%

In terms of spoken languages, Ukrainka is primarily Ukrainian speaking, yet Russian is also commonly spoken. At the time of the census, 71% of the population stated to be native Ukrainian speakers, while 28% claimed to primarily speak Russian. The exact linguistic composition of the city was as follows:

Languages in Ukrainka
	percent
Ukrainian	71.2%
Russian	28.2%
Belarusian	0.2%
Armenian	0.1%
others	0.1%

== Economy ==
The Trypilska thermal power plant is located in the city.
