= Neonila Lahodiuk =

Ukrainian jazz composer and pianist

Neonila Lahodiuk (born in Bohuslav, Kyiv region) is a Ukrainian jazz composer, a pianist and a music teacher. She works as a teacher at Stetsenko Music School No.1 in Kyiv. Ms. Lahodiuk has been awarded a title of the Merited Artist of Ukraine.

== Life ==
Since she was five, Lahodiuk started her music education at a music school, later with Professor Borys Milych. Then she attended Lysenko Music School, where she studied in the Budnitsky and the Freinkin classes, and also learned music composition in the class of Kucherova. For a year, she studied at Glier Kyiv Institute of Music in the Kanershtein class.

When Lahodiuk was seventeen, she became fascinated with jazz. At the same time, she began to teach at the pop music department of Stetsenko Music School No.1 in Kyiv. In 1997 she graduated from Kyiv National University of Culture and Arts.

== Work ==
Composer

She composes jazz, pop and classic style music. Lagoduik is the author of more than 500 classical, pop, jazz piano pieces, 20 compositions for saxophone and orchestra, concerts for trumpet and saxophone, a rhapsody for two pianos and two song albums. She recorded two solo CDs of her works.

Performer

While pursuing her solo music career, Lahodiuk also performed in the Synelnikov band.

Teacher

Lagodiuk is the author of textbook on jazz performance for students in grades 3-7 of music schools. In 2005, she published her "Jazz Etudes with Improvisation" for piano.

== Honours ==
- Merited Artist of Ukraine (2017).
