= Kozyn settlement hromada =

Kozyn settlement hromada Козинська селищна громада
- Hromada
- Interactive map of Kozyn settlement hromada
- Country: Ukraine
- Oblast: Kyiv
- Raion: Obukhiv

Area
  - Total: 168.6 km^{2} (65.1 sq mi)

Population (2020)
  - Total: 5,646
  - Density: 33.49/km^{2} (86.73/sq mi)
- Settlements: 13
- Villages: 12
- Towns: 1

Kozyn settlement hromada (Ukrainian: Козинська селищна громада) is a hromada of Ukraine, located in Obukhiv Raion, Kyiv Oblast. Its administrative center is the town of Kozyn.

It has an area of 168.6 square kilometres (65.1 mi^{2}) and a population of 5,646, as of 2020.

The hromada includes 13 settlements: 1 town (Kozyn), and 12 villages:

- Berezove
- Velyki Dmytrovychi
- Kapustiana
- Koniusha
- Krenychi
- Mali Dmytrovychi
- Novi Bezradychi
- Parashchyna
- Pidhirtsi
- Romankiv
- Stari Bezradychi
- Tarasivka

== See also ==
- List of hromadas of Ukraine
