= Ukrainka urban hromada =

Ukrainka urban hromada Українська міська громада
- Hromada
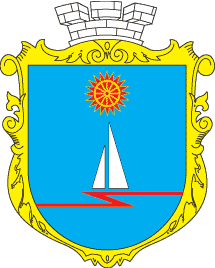
- Seal
- Interactive map of Ukrainka urban hromada
- Country: Ukraine
- Oblast: Kyiv
- Raion: Obukhiv

Area
  - Total: 206.7 km^{2} (79.8 sq mi)

Population (2020)
  - Total: 20,806
  - Density: 100.7/km^{2} (260.7/sq mi)
- Settlements: 8
- Cities: 1
- Villages: 7

Ukrainka urban hromada (Ukrainian: Українська міська громада) is a hromada of Ukraine, located in Obukhiv Raion, Kyiv Oblast. Its administrative center is the city of Ukrainka.

It has an area of 206.7 square kilometres (79.8 mi^{2}) and a population of 20,806, as of 2020.

The hromada contains 8 settlements: 1 city (Ukrainka), and 7 villages:

- Veremia
- Vytachiv
- Zhukivtsi
- Pliuty
- Trypillia
- Khalepia
- Shcherbanivka

== See also ==
- List of hromadas of Ukraine
