= Bohuslav urban hromada =

Bohuslav urban hromada Богуславська міська громада
- Hromada
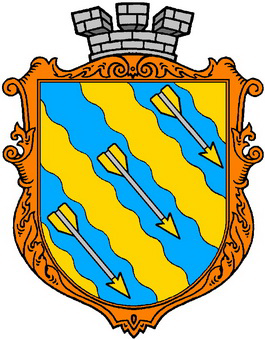
- Seal
- Interactive map of Bohuslav urban hromada
- Country: Ukraine
- Oblast: Kyiv Oblast
- Raion: Obukhiv Raion

Area
  - Total: 492.6 km^{2} (190.2 sq mi)

Population (2023)
  - Total: 25,404
  - Density: 51.57/km^{2} (133.6/sq mi)
- Settlements: 26
- Cities: 1
- Villages: 25

Bohuslav urban hromada (Ukrainian: Богуславська міська громада) is a hromada of Ukraine, located in Obukhiv Raion, Kyiv Oblast. Its administrative center is the city of Bohuslav.

It has an area of 492.6 square kilometres (190.2 mi^{2}) and a population of 25,404, as of 2023.

The hromada contains 26 settlements: 1 city (Bohuslav), and 25 villages:

- Biivtsi
- Borodani
- Vilkhovets
- Deshky
- Dybyntsi
- Ivky
- Isaiky
- Kalynivka
- Karandyntsi
- Kidanivka
- Liutari
- Mysailivka
- Moskalenky
- Polovetske
- Potashnia
- Rozkopantsi
- Savarka
- Semyhory
- Synytsia
- Teptiivka
- Tunyki
- Khokhitva
- Chaiky
- Shupyky
- Yatsiuky

== See also ==
- List of hromadas of Ukraine
