= Ros (river) =

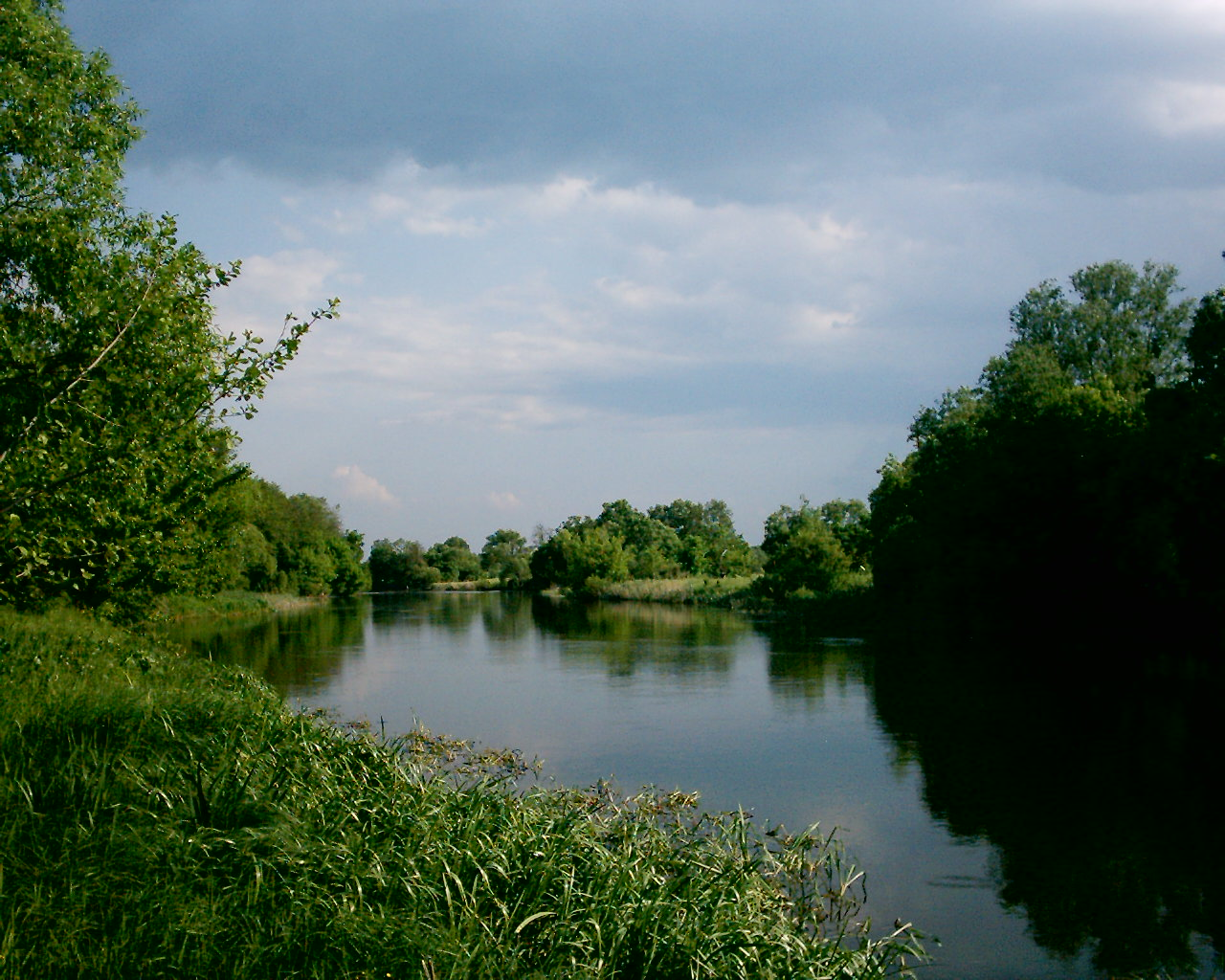
- The Ros near Sukholisy

Physical characteristics
- Source
  - location: Ordyntsi, Ukraine
- Mouth: Dnieper
  - location: Kremenchuk Reservoir
  - coordinates: 49°38′11″N 31°38′10″E
- Length: 346 km (215 mi)
- Basin size: 12,600 km^{2} (4,900 sq mi)

Basin features
- Progression: Dnieper→ Dnieper–Bug estuary→ Black Sea
- Tributaries
  - left: Rosava

The Ros (Ukrainian: Рось; Russian: Рось; Polish: Roś) is a river in Ukraine, a right tributary of the Dnieper. The river's source is located in the village of Ordyntsi in Vinnytsia Oblast. The Ros is 346 kilometres (215 mi) long, and has a drainage basin of 12,600 square kilometres (4,900 sq mi). The most important towns on the river are Bila Tserkva, Bohuslav, and Korsun-Shevchenkivskyi.

The Ros flows into the Kremenchuk Reservoir. It is fed mainly by snow. Flooding occurs between March and April. The average water discharge 65 kilometres (40 mi) from the mouth of the river is 22.5 cubic metres (790 cu ft) per second. The river usually freezes during November and December, thawing any time from late February to early April. It is navigable for 60 kilometres (37 mi).
