= Kozyn =

Rural locality in Kyiv Oblast, Ukraine

Kozyn Козин
- Rural settlement
- Winter sunset in Kozyn

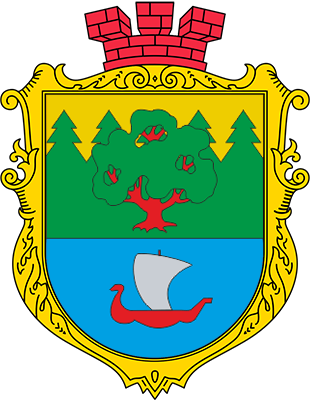
- Coat of arms

- Location within Ukraine Location within Kyiv Oblast
- Coordinates: 50°13′N 30°39′E
- Country: Ukraine
- Oblast: Kyiv Oblast
- Raion: Obukhiv Raion
- Founded: 1000

Population (2001)
  - Total: 3,300
- Postal code: 08711—08712
- Area code: +380 4472

Kozyn (Ukrainian: Козин) is a rural settlement in Obukhiv Raion of Kyiv Oblast (province) of Ukraine. It hosts the administration of Kozyn settlement hromada, one of the hromadas of Ukraine. Population: 3,536 (2022 estimate).

Kozyn is situated on the rivers Dnieper and the Kozynka, 25 km. to the south of Kyiv.

Until 26 January 2024, Kozyn was a designated urban-type settlement. On this day, a new law entered into force which abolished this status, and Kozyn became a rural settlement.
