= Obukhiv Raion =

Subdivision of Kyiv Oblast, Ukraine

Obukhiv Raion Обухівський район
- Raion
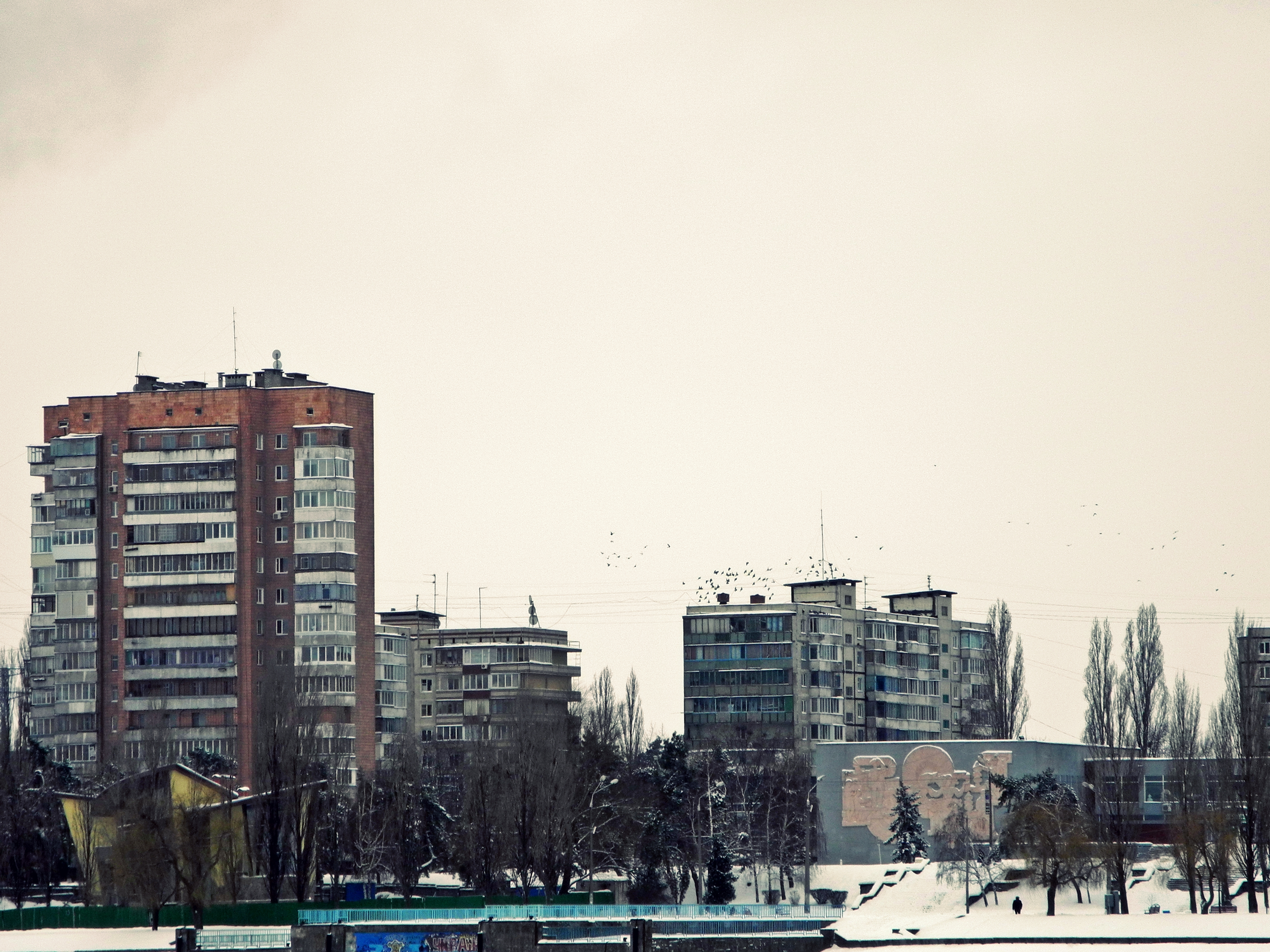

- Flag Coat of arms

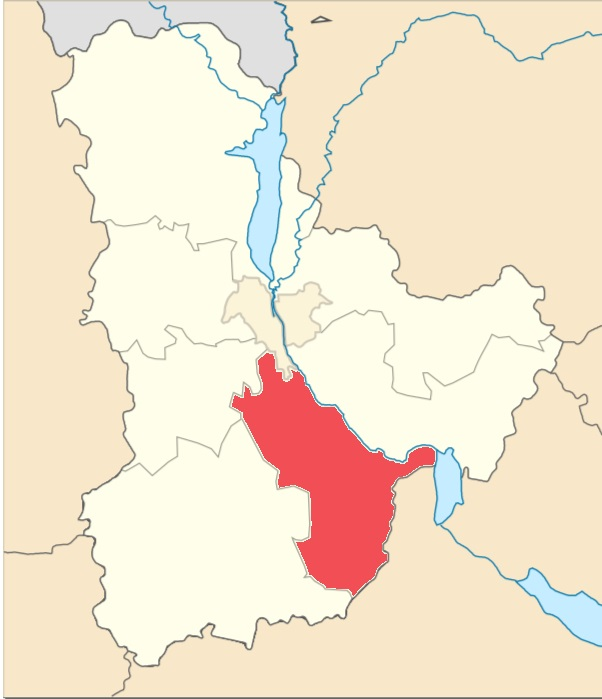
- Obukhiv Raion after the 2020 raion reform
- Coordinates: 50°7′N 30°37′E
- Country: Ukraine
- Oblast: Kyiv Oblast
- Admin. center: Obukhiv
- Subdivisions: 9 hromadas

Population (2022)
  - Total: 227,209
- Time zone: UTC+02:00 (EET)
  - Summer (DST): UTC+03:00 (EEST)
- Area code: +380

Obukhiv Raion (Ukrainian: Обухівський район, romanized: Obukhivskyi raion) is a raion (district) in Kyiv Oblast of Ukraine. Its administrative center is Obukhiv. Population: 227,209 (2022 estimate).

On 18 July 2020, as part of the administrative reform of Ukraine, the number of raions of Kyiv Oblast was reduced to seven, and the area of Obukhiv Raion was significantly expanded. Two abolished raions, Kaharlyk and Myronivka Raions, as well of Obukhiv Municipality and the cities of Vasylkiv and Rzhyshchiv, which were previously incorporated as cities of oblast significance, and parts of Bohuslav, Kyiv-Sviatoshyn, and Vasylkiv Raions, were merged into Obukhiv Raion. The January 2020 estimate of the raion population was 35,278 (2020 est.).

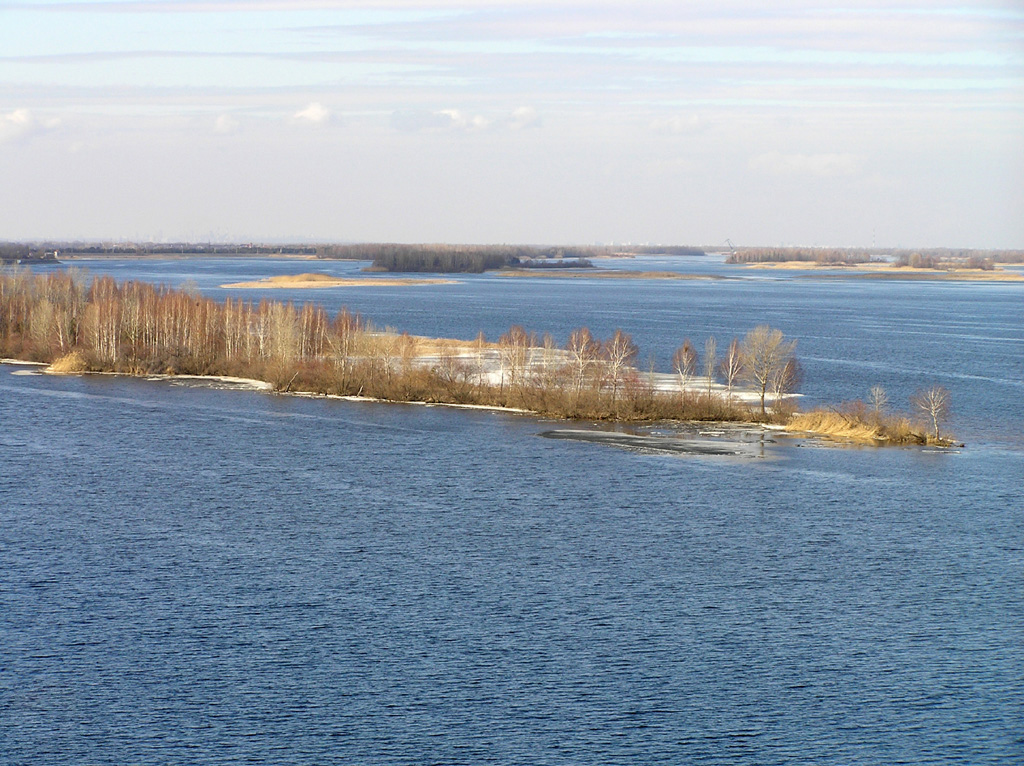
Trypillia on the Dnieper River.

== Subdivisions ==
=== Current ===
After the reform in July 2020, the raion consisted of 9 hromadas:

Obukhiv Raion subdivisions
| Hromada (Community) | Admin. center | Population (2020) | Transferred/Retained from |
|---|---|---|---|
| Bohuslav urban | Bohuslav | 25,821 | Bohuslav Raion; |
| Feodosiivska rural | Khodosivka | 15,200 | Kyiv-Sviatoshyn Raion; |
| Kaharlyk urban | Kaharlyk | 26,849 | Kaharlyk Raion; |
| Kozyn settlement | Kozyn | 5,646 | |
| Myronivka urban | Myronivka | 32,037 | Myronivka Raion; |
| Obukhiv urban | Obukhiv | 42,639 | Obukhiv Municipality; |
| Rzhyshchiv urban | Rzhyshchiv | 14,288 | city of oblast significance of Rzhyshchiv; |
| Ukrainka urban | Ukrainka | 20,806 | |
| Vasylkiv urban | Vasylkiv | 45,406 | city of oblast significance of Vasylkiv. |

=== Before 2020 ===
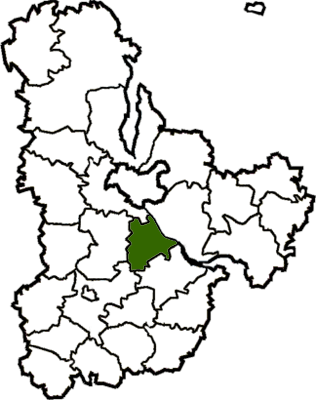
Obukhiv Raion in Kyiv Oblast (1966-2020)

Before the 2020 reform, the raion consisted of two hromadas,

- Kozyn settlement hromada with the administration in Kozyn;
- Ukrainka urban hromada with the administration in Ukrainka.
