= Myronivka urban hromada =

Myronivka urban hromada Миронівська міська громада
- Hromada
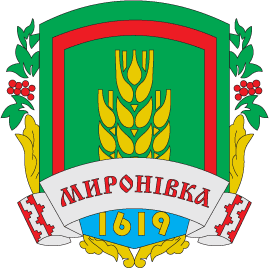
- Seal
- Interactive map of Myronivka urban hromada
- Country: Ukraine
- Oblast: Kyiv
- Raion: Obukhiv

Area
  - Total: 797.5 km^{2} (307.9 sq mi)

Population (2020)
  - Total: 32,037
  - Density: 40.17/km^{2} (104.0/sq mi)
- Settlements: 40
- Cities: 1
- Villages: 39

Myronivka urban hromada (Ukrainian: Миронівська міська громада) is a hromada of Ukraine, located in Obukhiv Raion, Kyiv Oblast. Its administrative center is the city Myronivka.

It has an area of 797.5 square kilometres (307.9 mi^{2}) and a population of 32,037, as of 2020.

The hromada contains 40 settlements: 1 city (Myronivka), and 39 villages:

- Andriivka
- Vakhutyntsi
- Viktorivka
- Vladyslavka
- Horobiivka
- Huli
- Yemchykha
- Zelenky
- Ivanivka
- Karapyshi
- Kypiachka
- Kozyn
- Korytyshche
- Kuleshiv
- Kuteliv
- Makedony
- Mali Prytsky
- Maslivka
- Matviivka
- Mykytiany
- Mykhailivka
- Nova Myronivka
- Nova Oleksandrivka
- Oleksandrivka
- Oleksiivka
- Poliove
- Potik
- Pustovity
- Piatykhatka
- Rosava
- Saliv
- Svitle
- Tarasivka
- Tulyntsi
- Frolivka
- Tsentralne
- Shandra
- Yukhny
- Yakhny

== See also ==
- List of hromadas of Ukraine
