= Kaharlyk urban hromada =

Kaharlyk urban hromada Кагарлицька міська громада
- Hromada
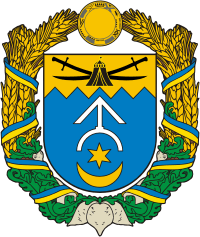
- Seal
- Interactive map of Kaharlyk urban hromada
- Country: Ukraine
- Oblast: Kyiv
- Raion: Obukhiv

Area
  - Total: 671.4 km^{2} (259.2 sq mi)

Population (2020)
  - Total: 26,849
  - Density: 39.99/km^{2} (103.6/sq mi)
- Settlements: 36
- Cities: 1
- Villages: 35

Kaharlyk urban hromada (Ukrainian: Кагарлицька міська громада) is a hromada of Ukraine, located in Obukhiv Raion, Kyiv Oblast. Its administrative center is the city Kaharlyk.

It has an area of 671.4 square kilometres (259.2 mi^{2}) and a population of 26,849, as of 2020.

The hromada contains 36 settlements: 1 city (Kaharlyk), and 35 villages:

- Antonivka
- Bendiuhivka
- Burty
- Vyselkove
- Voronivka
- Horokhivske
- Horokhove
- Horokhuvatka
- Demivshchyna
- Zelenyi Yar
- Zemlianka
- Zikrachi
- Zorivka
- Ivanivka
- Kadomka
- Kalynivka
- Leonivka
- Lypovets
- Lishchynka
- Myrivka
- Novosilky
- Orikhove
- Ocheretiane
- Pereselennia
- Rasavka
- Rasavka
- Sloboda
- Stavy
- Sushchany
- Tarasivka
- Ternivka
- Khalcha
- Cherniakhiv
- Shpendivka
- Shubivka

== See also ==
- List of hromadas of Ukraine
