= Kaharlyk =

City in Kyiv Oblast, Ukraine

Kaharlyk Кагарлик
- City
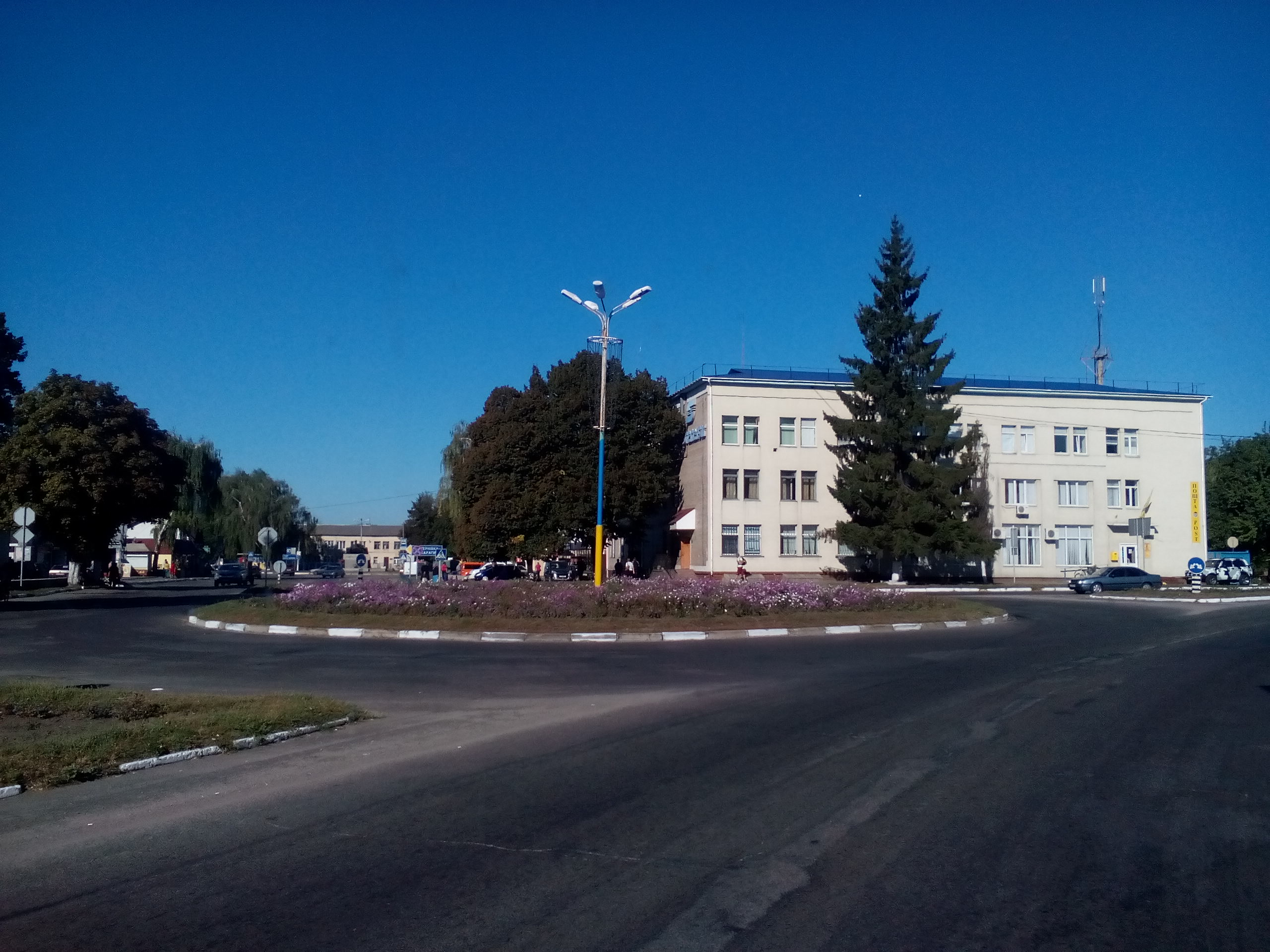
- City centre

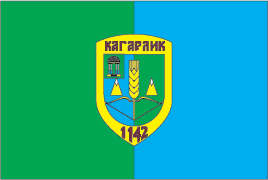
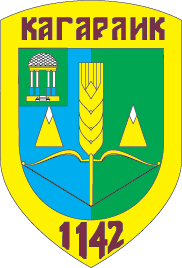
- Flag Coat of arms
- Interactive map of Kaharlyk
- Location within Kyiv Oblast Location within Ukraine
- Coordinates: 49°51′8″N 30°48′33″E
- Country: Ukraine
- Oblast: Kyiv Oblast
- Raion: Obukhiv Raion
- Hromada: Kaharlyk urban hromada
- Founded: 1142
- City rights: 1971-08-03

Government
  - Mayor: Oleksandr Panyuta

Population (2022)
  - Total: 13,133
- Time zone: UTC+2 (EET)
  - Summer (DST): UTC+3 (EEST)
- Postal code: 09200 - 09205
- Area code: +380 4573
- Website: www.kagarlyk.com.ua

Kaharlyk (Ukrainian: Кагарлик, IPA: [kɐɦɐrˈlɪk]) is a small city in Kyiv Oblast (province) of Ukraine, located in Obukhiv Raion. Kaharlyk hosts the administration of Kaharlyk urban hromada, one of the hromadas of Ukraine. Population: 13,133 (2022 estimate).

== History ==
In 1858, a sugar plant was built here.

Later in the 19th century it was a center of Kagarlyk volost in Kievsky Uyezd of Kiev Governorate of the Russian Empire.

In the 1930s a dairy plant was built here during industrialization.

During World War II it was occupied by Axis troops from August 3, 1941 until January 8, 1944.

About half of the Jews lived in the town managed to flee before the German invasion. Those who remained were murdered by the end of 1941.

An unknown number of Jews were killed in town in September 1941. The memorial that exists today does not mention the Jewish victims.

In 1952, it was a large village. There were a sugar plant, a dairy plant, four schools, a library, one sovkhoz and one MTS.

Urban-type settlement from 1956 until 1971, town since 1971.

In January 1989, the population was 14,065, there were several food industry enterprises.

In 2011 a security checkpoint "Kaharlyk" was built here.

In January 2013, population was 13,758 people.

In 2014, a dystopian novel Kaharlyk was published depicting a fictional town in a dystopian future under Russian occupation.

In May 2020, the 2020 Kaharlyk police rape gained widespread media attention across Ukraine, spurring protests.

Until 18 July 2020, Kaharlyk served as an administrative center of Kaharlyk Raion. The raion was abolished that day as part of the administrative reform of Ukraine, which reduced the number of raions of Kyiv Oblast to seven. The area of Kaharlyk Raion was merged into Obukhiv Raion.

== Transport ==
There is a railway station of the Southwestern Railways

== Notable residents ==
- Mykola Marychevskyi (1961–2005), Ukrainian journalist, publicist, art historian, editor, publisher

== Gallery ==
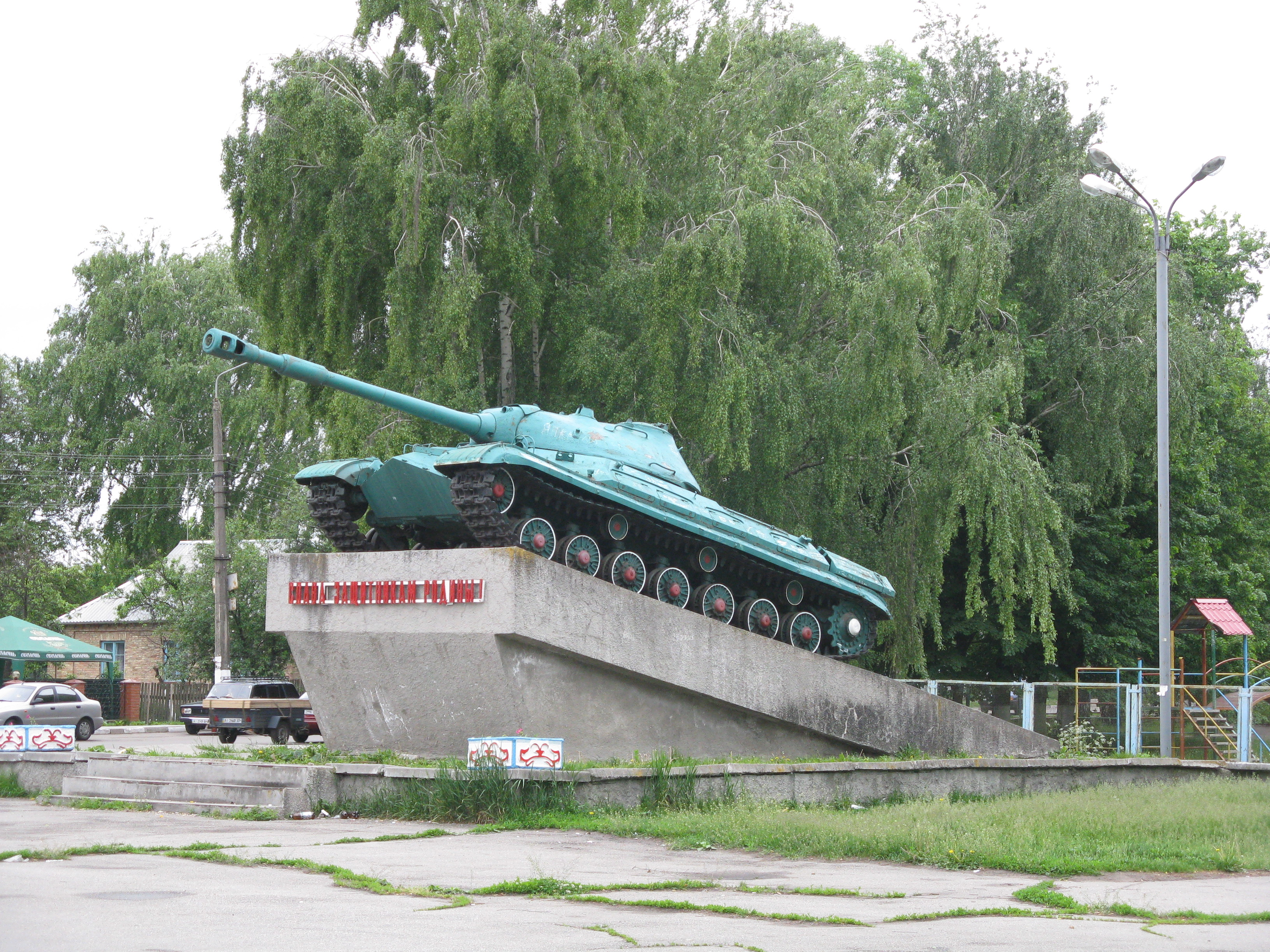
T-10M monument

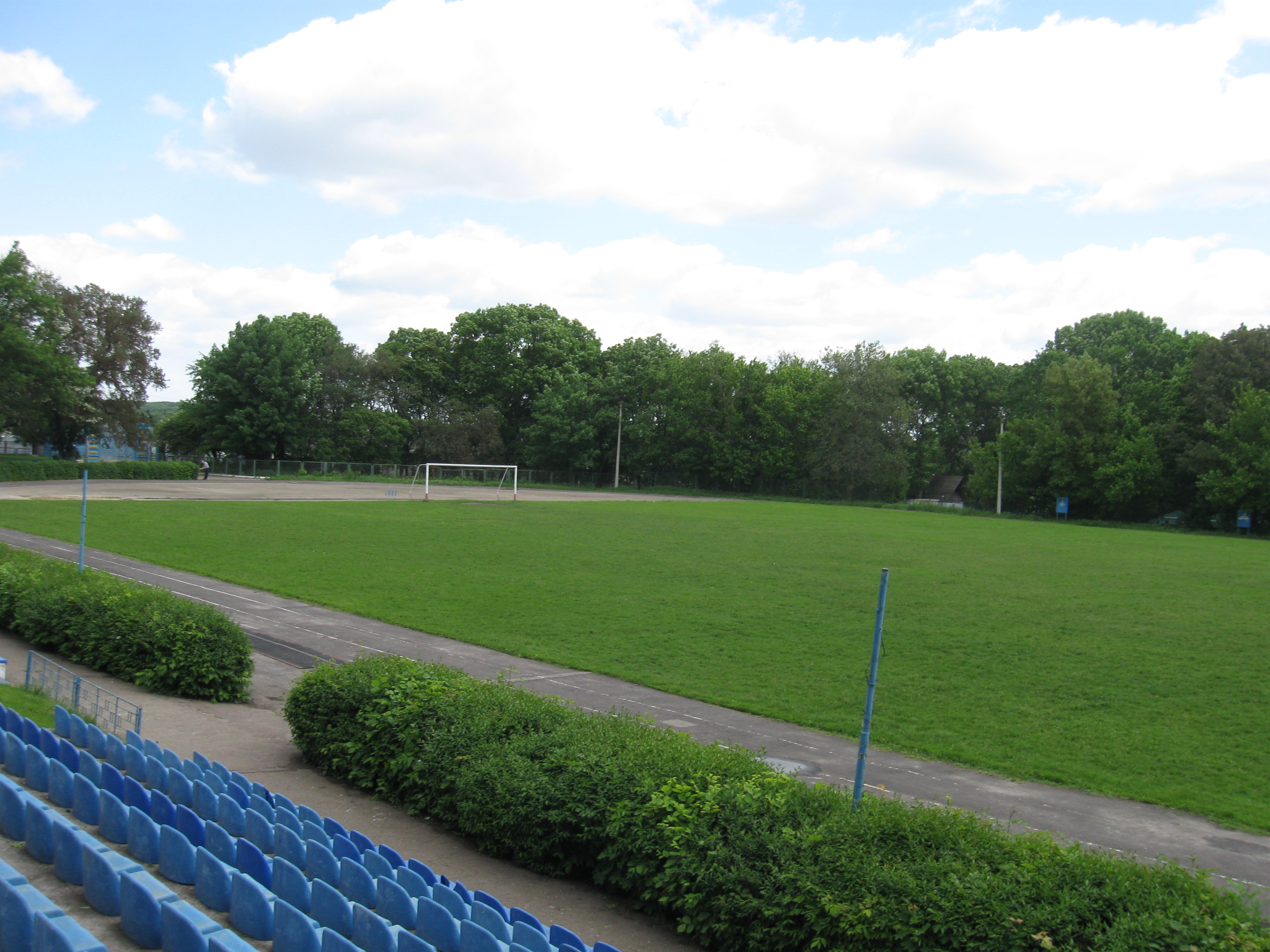
City stadium

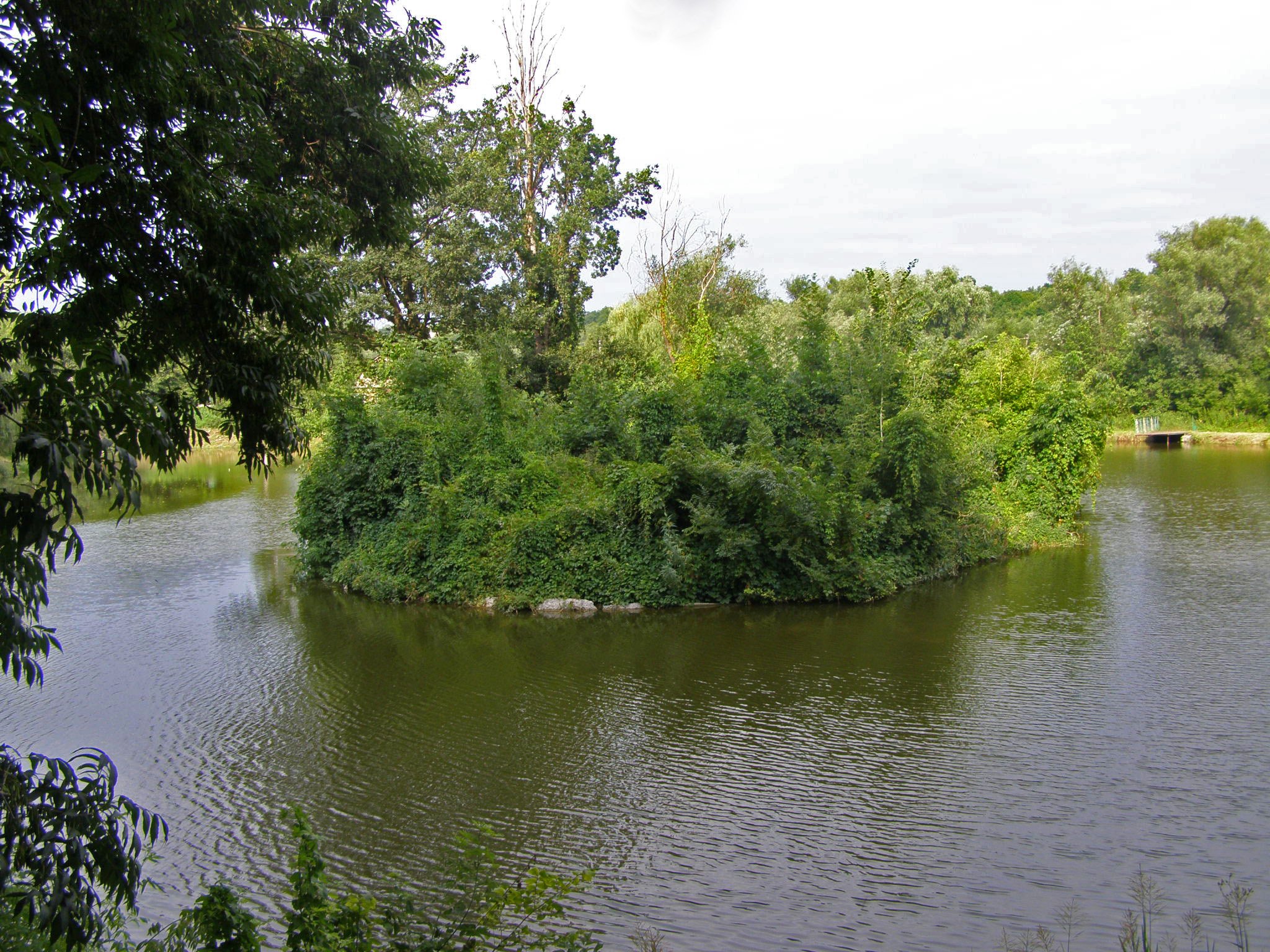
Island in Kaharlyk park
