= List of peasant revolts =

This is a chronological list of revolts organized by peasants.

== Background ==
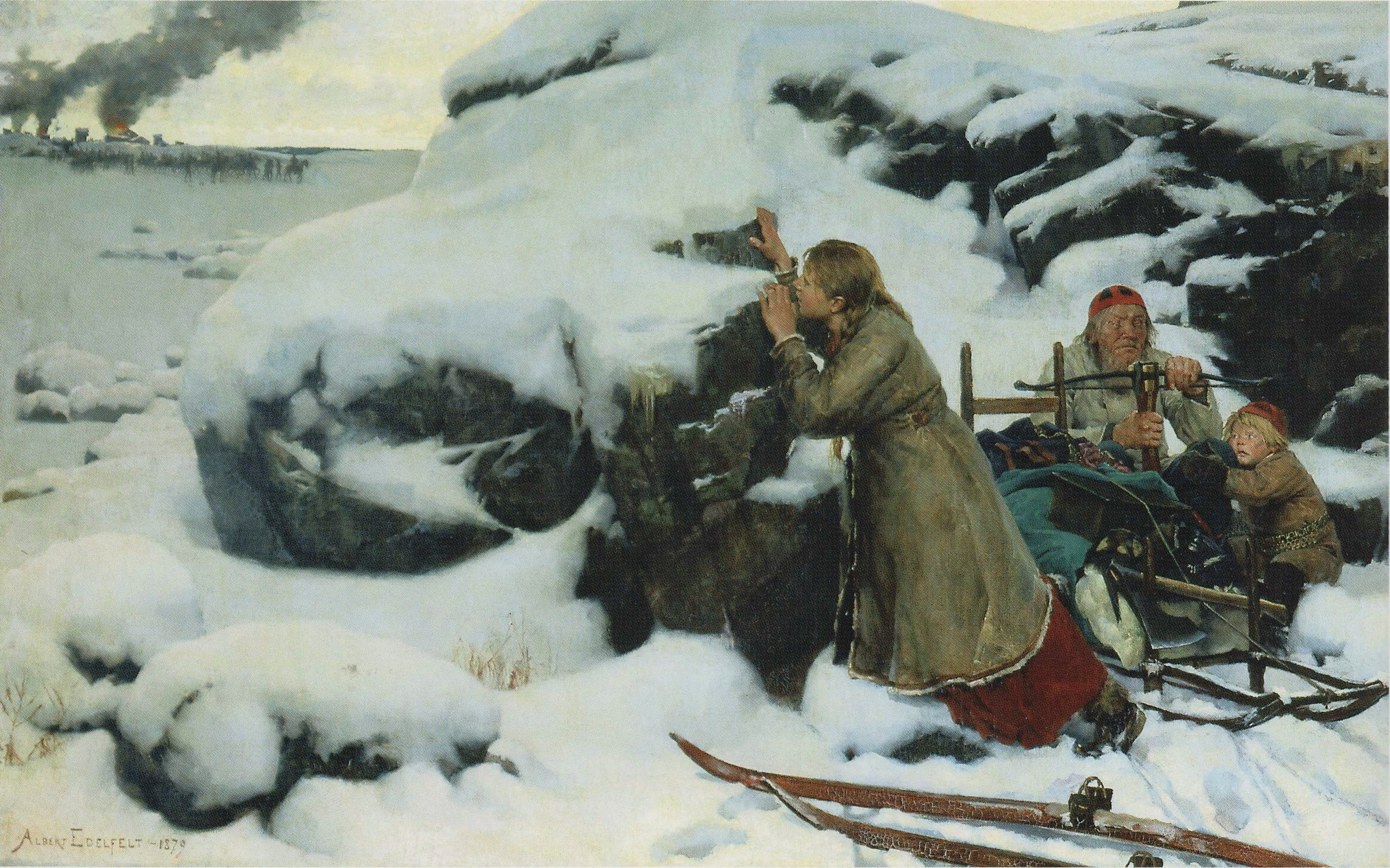
The Cudgel War was the 16th century peasant uprising in Finland, which was at that time part of the Kingdom of Sweden. Poltettu kylä (Burned Village), by Albert Edelfelt, 1879

The history of peasant wars spans over two thousand years. A variety of factors fueled the emergence of the peasant revolt phenomenon, including:

- Tax resistance
- Social inequality
- Religious war
- National liberation
- Resistance against serfdom
- Land reform
- External factors such as plague and famine

Later peasant revolts such as the Telangana Rebellion were also influenced by agrarian socialist ideologies such as Maoism.

The majority of peasant rebellions ended prematurely and were unsuccessful. Peasants suffered from limited funding and lacked the training and organisational capabilities of professional armies.

== Chronological list ==
The list gives the name, the date, the peasant allies and enemies, and the result of these conflicts following this legend:

Peasant victory
Peasant defeat
Another result (e.g. a treaty or peace without a clear result, status quo ante bellum, result unknown or indecisive)
Ongoing conflict

| Date | Conflict | State | Peasants | Result | Image | Ref. |
|---|---|---|---|---|---|---|
| 209–206 BC | Anti-Qin revolts (including Dazexiang Uprising) | Qin dynasty | Peasants under several rebel leaders, including Chen Sheng, Wu Guang, Xiang Yu, and Liu Bang | Qin dissolution | | |
| 205–186 BC | Great Theban Revolt | Ptolemaic Kingdom | Native Egyptian peasants and soldiers under secessionist Pharaohs Hugronaphor and Ankhmakis | Suppression of the rebellion | | |
| 17–25 | Lülin | Xin dynasty | Lülin rebels | Collapse of Xin dynasty; ascendancy of rebel leader Liu Xiu after infighting among Lülin forces | | |
| 17–27 | Red Eyebrows | Xin dynasty | Red Eyebrows rebels | Goal of the rebellion partially achieved, but eventual defeat of the movement by Liu Xiu | | |
| 172–173 | Bucolic War | Roman Empire | Egyptian peasants under Isidorus | Suppression of the rebellion | | |
| 184–205 | Yellow Turban Rebellion | Han dynasty | Yellow Turban rebels | Suppression of the rebellion, though Han dynasty is severely weakened | | |
| 185–205 | Heishan bandit movement | Han dynasty | Bandit confederacy of the Taihang Mountains Gongsun Zan's forces | Suppression of the rebellion, though Han dynasty is severely weakened | | |
| 200s–400s | Bagaudae | Roman Empire | Bagaudae Suebi | Gain control of some territory; end with the general collapse of the Roman Empire | | |
| 300s–late 400s | Circumcellions | Roman Empire (until 435) Catholic Church (until 435) Vandal Kingdom (since 435) African landlords | Berber and Roman peasants Donatist authorities Rebellious Roman military under Gildo (in 398) | End of Roman Catholic rule in Africa, but suppression of the rebellion by Vandals and Arian authorities | | |
| 611–619 | Anti-Sui rebellions | Sui dynasty | Peasants under several rebel leaders Defected military forces under several rebel generals, officials and nobles | Collapse of Sui dynasty; ascendancy of rebel leader Li Yuan after infighting among rebel forces | | |
| 720–832 | Bashmurian revolts | Rashidun Caliphate | Native Egyptian peasants rise in resistance against Arab rule, Bashmur becomes capital of semi-independent native state | Suppression of the rebellion after 112 years | | |
| 841–843 | Stellinga Uprising | Saxon nobility Frankish military under Louis the German | Stellinga | Suppression of the rebellion | | |
| 859–860 | Rebellion of Ch'iu Fu | Tang dynasty | Chinese peasants and bandits under Ch'iu Fu | Suppression of the rebellion, though Tang dynasty is severely weakened | | |
| 874–878 | Rebellion of Wang Xianzhi | Tang dynasty | Chinese peasants and bandits under Wang Xianzhi and Shang Junzhang | Suppression of the rebellion, though Tang dynasty is severely weakened | | |
| 875–884 | Rebellion of Huang Chao | Tang dynasty | Chinese peasants and bandits under Huang Chao | Suppression of the rebellion, though Tang dynasty is severely weakened | | |
| 928–932 | Basil the Copper Hand Rebellions | Byzantine Empire | Peasants under Basil the Copper Hand | Suppression of the rebellion | | |
| 993–995 | Da Shu rebellion in Sichuan | Song dynasty | Peasants under Wang Xiaobo and Li Shun | Suppression of the rebellion | | |
| 996 | Peasants' revolt in Normandy | Normandy under Rodulf of Ivry and Richard II, Duke of Normandy | Norman peasants | Suppression of the rebellion | | |
| 1277–1280 | Uprising of Ivaylo | Bulgarian nobility Byzantine Empire Golden Horde | Peasants under Ivaylo | Murder of Ivaylo | | |
| 1323–1328 | Peasant revolt in Flanders | Kingdom of France | Flemish peasants | Suppression of the rebellion | | |
| 1343–1345 | St. George's Night Uprising | Livonian Order Kingdom of Denmark | Estonian peasants | Suppression of the rebellion | | |
| 1351–1368 | Red Turban Rebellion | Yuan dynasty Goryeo | Red Turban Armies of White Lotus members, Manichaeans and Chinese peasants | Fall of Yuan dynasty and retreat of the Mongols into Mongolia as the Northern Yuan dynasty; ascendancy of rebel leader Zhu Yuanzhang after infighting among rebel forces | | |
| 1358 | Jacquerie | Kingdom of France | French peasants | Suppression of the rebellion | | |
| 1381 | Peasants' Revolt | Kingdom of England | English peasants | Suppression of the rebellion, though Plantagenet dynasty is weakened | | |
| 1382 | Harelle | Kingdom of France | French peasants | Suppression of the rebellion | | |
| 1428 | Shōchō uprising | Ashikaga shogunate | Japanese peasants | Peasant debts cancelled. | | |
| 1437 | Transylvanian peasant revolt | Kingdom of Hungary | Transylvanian peasants | Suppression of the rebellion | | |
| 1438 | Hallvard Graatops Revolt | Kalmar Union | Norwegian peasants | Suppression of the rebellion | | |
| 1438–1439 | David's Rebellion | Kalmar Union | Finnish peasants | Suppression of the rebellion | | |
| 1441 | Kakitsu uprising | Ashikaga shogunate | Do-ikki (leagues) of peasants and jizamurai | Peasant debts cancelled, Ashikaga shogunate is severely weakened. | | |
| 1441 | Funen and Jutland Peasant rebellions | Kalmar Union | Danish peasants | Suppression of the rebellion | | |
| 1450 | Jack Cade's Rebellion | Kingdom of England | English peasants | Suppression of the rebellion, though Lancaster dynasty is weakened and eventually overthrown during the Wars of the Roses. | | |
| 1450–1451 | John and William Merfold's Uprising | Kingdom of England | English peasants | Suppression of the rebellion | | |
| 1453–1454 | Morea revolt of 1453–54 | (Byzantine Empire) Despotate of the Morea Ottoman Empire | Greek peasants under Manuel Kantakouzenos Albanians under Peter Bua Latin loyalists under John Asen Zaccaria | Suppression of the rebellion | | |
| 1462–1472, 1485–1486 | War of the Remences | Catalan constitutionalists and nobility (1462–1472) Crown of Aragon (1485–1486) | Catalan peasants Royalists under John II of Aragon (1462–1472) | Goal of the rebellion largely achieved, Sentència de Guadalupe signed | | |
| 1467–1469 | Galician Irmandiños Revolt | Kingdom of Galicia (Crown of Castile) | Galician peasants, led by Galician burgeoisie and part of the local lower nobility | Suppression of the rebellion by feudal armies | | |
| 1476 | Niklashausen Peasant Revolt | Holy Roman Empire | German peasants led by Hans Böhm, who had a vision of the Virgin Mary, against the nobility and clergy of the Holy Roman Empire. | Böhm executed and pilgrimages to Niklashausen ceased | | |
| 1478 | Carinthian Peasant Revolt | Holy Roman Empire | Carinthian peasants | Suppression of the rebellion | | |
| 1482–1511 | Yamashiro ikki uprisings | Ashikaga shogunate Various samurai clans | Yamashiro ikki and later, lesser ikki Various samurai clans | Most ikki submit to the shogunate in 1493, though they achieved many of their aims and continued to retain autonomy until the gradual end of the movement | | |
| 1487–1488 | Kaga Rebellion | Togashi clan | Ikkō-ikki Motoori clan Yamagawa clan | Decisive victory for the Ikkō-ikki. | | |
| 1488–1582 | Ikkō-ikki Uprisings | Several major samurai clans (including Oda clan and Tokugawa clan) Nichiren sect Tendai sōhei Jōdo-shū sōhei | Ikkō-shū peasant and ji-samurai leagues Jōdo Shinshū sōhei Mōri clan Azai clan Asakura clan | Destruction of most militant Ikkō-shū leagues; Jōdo Shinshū sect and remaining Ikkō-ikki submit to Toyotomi Hideyoshi | | |
| 1490–1492 | Mukha rebellion | Kingdom of Poland | Orthodox Ruthenian peasants Orthodox Moldavian peasants | Suppression of the rebellion | | |
| 1493–1517 | Bundschuh movement | Holy Roman Empire | German peasants | All rebellions suppressed | | |
| 1498–1878 | Opryshky movement | Kingdom of Poland Austrian Empire | Ruthenian (Ukrainian) peasants Hutsul peasants | Suppression of the movement | | |
| 1511 | Friulian Revolt | Republic of Venice | Friulian peasants | Suppression of the rebellion | | |
| 1514 | Poor Conrad Rebellion | Duchy of Württemberg | Württemberg peasants | Suppression of the rebellion | | |
| 1514 | György Dózsa Rebellion | Kingdom of Hungary | Hungarian peasants | Suppression of the rebellion | | |
| 1515 | Slovene Peasant Revolt of 1515 | Holy Roman Empire | Slovene peasants | Suppression of the rebellion | | |
| 1515–1523 | Frisian peasant rebellion | Habsburg Netherlands | Arumer Zwarte Hoop Charles II, Duke of Guelders | Suppression of the rebellion | | |
| 1516–1521 | Trần Cảo Rebellion | Lê dynasty | Vietnamese peasants under Trần Cảo and Trần Cung | Suppression of the rebellion, though Lê dynasty is severely weakened | | |
| 1519–1659 | Celali rebellions | Ottoman Caliphate | Turkmen peasants | Suppression of the rebellion | | |
| 1524–1525 | German Peasants' War | Swabian League | German peasants | Suppression of the rebellion | | |
| 1524–1533 | Dalecarlian Rebellions | Sweden | Dalarna peasants | Suppression of the rebellion | | |
| 1525 | Palatine Peasants' War | Electoral Palatinate | Palatine peasants | Suppression of the rebellion | | |
| 1525 | Sambian peasant revolt | Duchy of Prussia | Prussian peasants | Suppression of the rebellion | | |
| 1534 | Skipper Clement's Rebellion | Christian III Kingdom of Denmark | Danish peasants under Skipper Clement Christian II | Suppression of the rebellion | | |
| 1540 | Peasant's Rebellion in Telemark | Denmark–Norway | Norwegian peasants | Suppression of the rebellion | | |
| 1542–1543 | Dacke War | Sweden | Småland peasants | Suppression of the rebellion | | |
| 1549 | Kett's Rebellion | Kingdom of England | English peasants | Suppression of the rebellion | | |
| 1573 | Croatian–Slovene Peasant Revolt | Holy Roman Empire Kingdom of Croatia | Slovene peasants Croatian peasants | Suppression of the rebellion | | |
| 1594–1637 | Croquant rebellions | Kingdom of France | French peasants | Suppression of all rebellions | | |
| 1596–1597 | Cudgel War | Sweden | Finnish peasants | Suppression of the rebellion | | |
| 1606–1607 | Bolotnikov Rebellion | Tsardom of Russia | Russian peasants | Suppression of the rebellion | | |
| 1626–1636 | Peasants' War in Upper Austria | Electorate of Bavaria | Austrian peasants | Suppression of the rebellion | | |
| 1630–1633 | Peasant uprising in Podhale | Polish–Lithuanian Commonwealth | Polish peasants | Suppression of the rebellion | | |
| 1630–1645 | Rebellion of Li Zicheng | Ming dynasty (1630–1644) Qing Dynasty (1644–1645) | Peasants under Li Zicheng, Gao Guiying and other generals of the Shun dynasty | Collapse of Ming dynasty, but suppression of the rebellion by Qing dynasty | | |
| 1630–1647 | Rebellion of Zhang Xianzhong | Ming dynasty (1630–1644) Qing Dynasty (1644–1647) | Peasants and bandits under Zhang Xianzhong | Collapse of Ming dynasty, but suppression of the rebellion by Qing dynasty | | |
| 1635 | Second Slovene peasants' revolt | Holy Roman Empire | Peasants under a scattered leadership of various leaders | Suppression of the rebellion | | |
| 1637–1638 | Shimabara Rebellion | Tokugawa shogunate (Netherlands) Dutch Empire | Christian peasants and rōnin | Suppression of the rebellion | | |
| 1639 | Revolt of the va-nu-pieds | Kingdom of France | Normandy peasants | Suppression of the rebellion | | |
| 1640 | Corpus de Sang | Principality of Catalonia | Catalan harvesters | Revolt successful. Start of the Reapers' War; eventual defeat of Catalonia | | |
| 1648 | Pokuttia Uprising | Polish–Lithuanian Commonwealth | Ruthenian (Ukrainian) peasants | rebels destroyed manors and churches, captured towns and castles, and dealt harshly with the nobility, Poles, Catholic clergy, and landlords Under pressure from Polish units in December 1648, S. Vysochan left Pokuttia with his regiment and retreated to Podillia. The uprising was suppressed | | |
| 1651 | Kostka-Napierski Uprising | Polish–Lithuanian Commonwealth | Polish peasants | Suppression of the rebellion | | |
| 1652 | Guo Huaiyi Rebellion | Dutch East India Company Aboriginal Taiwanese | Chinese peasants | Suppression of the rebellion | | |
| 1653 | Swiss peasant war of 1653 | Republic of the Swiss | Swiss peasants | Suppression of the rebellion | | |
| 1664–1665 | Varenytsia Uprising | Polish–Lithuanian Commonwealth | Ukrainian peasants Kalnyk Cossack regiment under Vasyl Varenytsia and Ivan Sulymka Zaporozhian Cossacks under Ivan Sirko | Suppression of the rebellion | | |
| 1664-1665 | Right-bank Uprising | Polish–Lithuanian Commonwealth | Ruthenian (Ukrainian) peasants Zaporozhian Cossacks (incl. from the left-bank Hetmanate) Don Cossacks Moscovite forces Kalmyk forces | temporary victory for Cossack-Russian forces Polish-Lithuanian influence shattered Stefan Czarniecki suppressed the uprising and ousted the Zaporozhians pro-Commonwealth Crimean Tatar forces largely defeated, leaving without captives Pavlo Teteria replaced by Petro Doroshenko as Hetman of the Zaporozhian Host | | |
| 1666 | Deineko Rebellion | Polish–Lithuanian Commonwealth | Ruthenian (Ukrainian) peasants led by Datsko Deineko | Regular troops sent by the king and the local noble militia suppressed the uprising in the autumn of 1666 | | |
| 1667–1671 | Stepan Razin Rebellion | Tsardom of Russia | Russian peasants Don Cossacks | Suppression of the rebellion | | |
| 1669–1670 | Peasant rebellion in Podhale | Polish–Lithuanian Commonwealth | Polish peasants | Suppression of the rebellion | | |
| 1687 | Left-bank Uprising | Cossack Hetmanate (vassal of the Tsardom of Moscow) | Ukrainian peasants Hadiach regiment Cossacks Pereiaslav regiment Cossacks Pryluky regiment Cossacks Starodub regiment Cossacks Lubny regiment Cossacks Myrhorod regiment Cossacks Chernihiv regiment Cossacks | rebellious peasants and Cossacks seized land and livestock from the nobility, tenants, and Cossack leaders, destroyed their estates, and killed the regimental commander Kiyashka and some other starshyna Rebellion suppressed by Ivan Mazepa using military force and considering the complaints of the victims in court participants in the uprising were interrogated, the most active were executed, and others were subjected to corporal punishment. | | |
| 1704 | Kuridža's Rebellion | Republic of Venice | Orthodox peasants | Suppression of the rebellion | | |
| 1705–1706 | Bavarian People's Uprising | Habsburg Monarchy | Bavarian peasants | Suppression of the rebellion | | |
| 1707–1708 | Bulavin Rebellion | Tsardom of Russia | Russian peasants Don Cossacks | Suppression of the rebellion | | |
| 1713 | Slovene peasant revolt in Tolmin | Holy Roman Empire | Peasants under a scattered leadership of various leaders, including Ivan Miklavčič | Suppression of the rebellion | | |
| 1730–1769 | Peasant revolts for the restoration of the Lê dynasty and land reforms | Trịnh lords Nguyễn lords | Vietnamese peasants Lê dynasty | Suppression of the rebellions and eventual collapse of Lê dynasty, but start of Tây Sơn Revolt | | |
| 1743 | Dalecarlian rebellion | Sweden | Swedish peasants | Suppression of the rebellion | | |
| 1765 | Strilekrigen | Denmark–Norway | Norwegian peasants | Suppression of the rebellion | | |
| 1767–1770 | Klishchyn Uprising | Russian Empire | Ukrainian peasants Zhovnynsk Cossacks | Suppression of the rebellion | | |
| 1768–1769 | Koliivshchyna | Polish–Lithuanian Commonwealth (Russia) Russian Empire | Haidamaka movement Orthodox Ukrainian peasants | Suppression of the rebellion | | |
| 1769–1788 | Tây Sơn Revolt | Nguyễn lords (until 1776); Nguyễn Ánh's forces (since 1776); Trịnh lords (until 1786); Siam (in 1785); Lê dynasty (1786–1788); Qing Dynasty (1787–1788) | Tây Sơn dynasty | Goal of the rebellion achieved; reunification of Vietnam and introduction of land reforms under Tây Sơn dynasty | | |
| 1773–1775 | Pugachev's Rebellion | Russian Empire | Russian peasants Ural Cossacks Bashkirs | Suppression of the rebellion | | |
| 1780–1783 | Rebellion of Túpac Amaru II | Spain | Quechua and Aymara peasants | Suppression of the rebellion | | |
| 1784 | Revolt of Horea, Cloșca and Crișan | Austrian Empire | Romanian peasants | Suppression of the rebellion | | |
| 1786–1787 | Lofthusreisingen | Denmark–Norway | Norwegian peasants | Suppression of the rebellion | | |
| 1786–1787 | Shays' Rebellion | United States | American farmers | Suppression of the rebellion, constitutional reform | | |
| 1789–1793 | Turbaii Uprising | Russian Empire | former Myrhorod Cossacks Ukrainian peasants | Suppression of the rebellion, self government abolished | | |
| 1790 | Saxon Peasants' Revolt | Saxony | Saxon peasants | Suppression of the rebellion | | |
| 1791–1794 | Whisky Rebellion | United States | American farmers | Suppression of the rebellion, whiskey tax is repealed shortly after | | |
| 1793–1796 | War in the Vendée | (France) French Republic | Catholic and Royal Army (Kingdom of France) Chouan rebels (Kingdom of France) Émigrés Great Britain | Suppression of the rebellion | | |
| 1793–1804 | Chouannerie | (France) French Republic | (Kingdom of France) Chouan rebels Catholic and Royal Army (Kingdom of France) Émigrés Great Britain | Suppression of the rebellion | | |
| 1794 | Kościuszko Uprising | Russian Empire Kingdom of Prussia Polish loyalists | Polish nationalist nobility Polish peasants Polish Jacobins | Suppression of the rebellion | | |
| 1794–1804 | White Lotus Rebellion | Qing Dynasty | White Lotus rebels | Suppression of the rebellion | | |
| 1798 | Peasants' War | (France) French Republic | Low countries peasants | Suppression of the rebellion | | |
| 1800–1802 | Lærdal Rebellion | Denmark–Norway | Norwegian peasants | Suppression of the rebellion | | |
| 1803 | Cherkasy Uprising of 1803 | Russian Empire | Ukrainian peasants | Suppression of the rebellion | | |
| 1807–1820 | Jean-Baptiste Perrier's rebellion | Republic of Haiti | Haitian peasants | Suppression of the rebellion | | |
| 1809 | Tyrolean Rebellion | (France) French Empire Bavaria Saxony Napoleonic Italy | Tyrolean peasants Austria | Suppression of the rebellion | | |
| 1809 | Gottscheer Rebellion | (France) First French Empire | (Austrian Empire) Gottschee German peasants Slovene peasants | Suppression of the rebellion | | |
| 1811 | Klågerup riots | Sweden | Swedish peasants | Suppression of the rebellion | | |
| 1813–1835 | Karmaliuk uprisings | Russian Empire | Ukrainian peasants Polish peasants Jewish peasants | Suppression of the rebellion | | |
| 1819 | Chuguev uprising | Russian Empire | military settlers of the Chuguev Regiment Ukrainian peasants | Suppression of the rebellion | | |
| 1826 | Ohramievchi uprising | Russian Empire | Ukrainian peasants | Suppression of the rebellion | | |
| 1826–1854 | Peasant uprisings during the reign of Nicholas I of Russia | Russian Empire | Russian peasants | About 556 small-scale rural uprisings took place during Nicholas' reign. All were suppressed, but contributed to the Russian Emperor's reluctance to end the serfdom in Russia. | | |
| 1829 | Shebelyntsi uprising | Russian Empire | Russian and Ukrainian peasants led by Stepan Diomin | The single-yard farmers destroyed the squadron commander, beat his members, and arrested them. The local authorities sent in troops to quell the uprising. On May 30, 1829, a bloody crackdown on the rebels began, during which 109 people were killed | | |
| 1832–1835 | Cabanada | Empire of Brazil | Restorationist peasants | Rebellion subdued after the premature death of former Emperor Pedro I | | |
| 1834–1835 | Syrian Peasant Revolt (1834–35) | Egypt Eyalet | Arab peasants | Suppression of the rebellion | | |
| 1835–1840 | Cabanagem | Empire of Brazil | Indigenous, mestizo and black peasants | Suppression of the rebellion | | |
| 1838–1841 | Balaiada | Empire of Brazil | Peasants and African slaves | Suppression of the rebellion | | |
| 1839–1845 | Anti-Rent War | United States New York (state) | Upstate tenant farmers | initially suppressed by the state militia, rebel anti-rent leaders arrested though they were either pardoned or not sentenced, anti-renters continued to rebel decades after the trials, the Antirenter party was formed and tenant rights were granted. | | |
| 1843-1844 | First Kobylytsia uprising | Austrian Empire | Ruthenian (Ukrainian) peasants | uprising broken up with the help of government troops, Lukian Kobylytsia arrested and imprisoned | | |
| 1844 | Piquet uprising | Republic of Haiti | Piquets (Haitian peasants) under Acaau | Piquet movement leaders integrated into government, but goals not achieved | | |
| 1846 | Acaau's second rebellion | Republic of Haiti | Haitian peasants under Acaau | Suppression of the rebellion | | |
| 1846 | Galician Peasant Uprising of 1846 | Austrian Empire | Galician peasants | De facto suppression of the rebellion, although it was both sparked and extinguished by the Austrian authorities and eventually led to abolition of serfdom in Galicia and Lodomeria two years later. | | |
| 1847–1915 | Caste War of Yucatán | Mexico; Guatemala; British Honduras | Maya peasants of the Yucatán Peninsula | Temporary establishment of Chan Santa Cruz state; eventually suppression of the rebellion | | |
| 1848-1849 | Second Kobylytsia uprising | Austrian Empire | Ruthenian (Ukrainian) peasants | Suppression of the rebellion Kobylytsia arrested in Zhabie in April 1850 and died of torture-related illness in 1851 | | |
| 1850–1864 | Taiping Rebellion | Qing Dynasty | Taiping Heavenly Kingdom | Suppression of the rebellion | | |
| 1851–1868 | Nian Rebellion | Qing Dynasty | Nian militias | Suppression of the rebellion | | |
| 1855 | Kiev Cossacks insurrection | Russian Empire | Kyiv "Cossacks" Ukrainian peasants | Suppression of the rebellion | | |
| 1856 | "To Tavria for freedom" movement | Russian Empire | Ukrainian peasants | Suppression of the rebellion | | |
| 1858 | Mahtra War | Russian Empire | Estonian peasants | Suppression of the rebellion | | |
| 1859–1862 | Indigo revolt | India | Indian peasants | Suppression of the rebellion | | |
| 1861 | Bezdna unrest | Russian Empire | Russian peasants | Suppression of the rebellion | | |
| 1862 | Great Peasant Uprising of 1862 | Joseon Dynasty | Korean peasants | Suppression of the rebellion | | |
| 1869 | Tambun Rebellion | Dutch East Indies | Farmer of Tambun | Suppression of the rebellion | | |
| 1884 | Chichibu Incident | Japan | Japanese peasants | Suppression of the rebellion | | |
| 1886 | Peasant rebellion in Ciomas | Dutch East Indies | Farmer of Ciomas | Suppression of the rebellion | | |
| 1888 | Peasant Revolt in Banten | Dutch East Indies | Bantenese peasants and ulamas | Suppression of the rebellion | | |
| 1892 | Jerez uprising | Spain | Regional fieldworkers | Suppression of the rebellion | | |
| 1894–1895 | Donghak Peasant Revolution | Japan Joseon Dynasty | Korean peasants | Suppression of the rebellion | | |
| 1896–1897 | War of Canudos | First Brazilian Republic | Canudos inhabitants | Suppression of the rebellion | | |
| 1899–1900 | Peasant unrest in Bulgaria | Principality of Bulgaria | Bulgarian peasants | Suppression of the rebellion | | |
| 1905–1906 | Sorochyntsi revolt | Russian Empire | Ukrainian peasants | Suppression of the rebellion | | |
| 1905–1908 | Maji Maji Rebellion | German East Africa | Matumbi people, Ngoni people, and other Tanganyikans | Suppression of the rebellion | | |
| 1907 | 1907 Romanian Peasants' Revolt | Kingdom of Romania | Romanian peasants | Suppression of the rebellion | | |
| 1910 | Kileler uprising | Kingdom of Greece | Farmers of Thessaly | Initial suppression of the rebellion, followed by the arrested declared innocent and some minor measures in favor of the peasants being taken the next year; Actual requests of the peasants began being fulfilled in 1923. | | |
| 1911 | Peasant rebellion in eastern Henan | Qing dynasty | Yellow Way Society | Suppression of the rebellion | | |
| 1912–1916 | Contestado War | First Brazilian Republic | Farmers and lumberjacks | Suppression of the rebellion | | |
| 1913 | Peasant revolt in Northern Shaanxi | Republic of China | Chinese poppy farmers and bandits under a sect leader | Spread of the revolt; poppy plant eradication campaign stopped | | |
| 1914 | Peasant Revolt in Albania | Principality of Albania Catholic Militia | Muslim peasants | Suppression of the rebellion | | |
| 1916 | Urkun | Russian Empire | Kyrgyz and Kazakh peasants | Suppression of the rebellion | | |
| 1917–1921 | Makhnovshchina | (Russian Empire) South Russia; Russian SFSR | Ukrainian peasants and workers | Suppression of the rebellion | | |
| 1918 | Livny Uprising | Russian SFSR | Russian peasants | Suppression of the rebellion | | |
| 1918 | Arsk Uprising | Russian SFSR | Tatar peasants | Suppression of the rebellion | | |
| 1918 | Sheksna uprising | Russian SFSR | Russian peasants | Suppression of the rebellion | | |
| 1918 | Anti-Hetman uprising | Ukrainian state | Ukrainian peasants Ukrainian directorate supporters Green Armies Left Socialist-Revolutionaries | Abdication of Hetman Skoropadskyi Restoration of the Ukrainian People's Republic Preliminary peace agreement between Ukraine and the Russian Soviet Federative Socialist Republic | | |
| 1919 | Khotyn uprising | Kingdom of Romania | Ukrainian peasants | Suppression of the rebellion | | |
| 1919 | Chapan rebellion | Russian SFSR | Russian peasants | Suppression of the rebellion | | |
| 1919 | Hryhoriv Uprising | Ukrainian SSR Makhnovshchina | Ukrainian peasants | Uprising defeated Red Army recaptures rebel-held territory Nykyfor Hryhoriv assassinated by the forces of Nestor Makhno | | |
| 1919 | Trypillia Incident | Ukrainian SSR | Ukrainian peasants Borotbists | Rebel victory | | |
| 1919–1922 | Kholodny Yar Republic | Ukrainian SSR Volunteer Army | Ukrainian peasants | Uprising suppressed | | |
| 1919–1922 | Rebellion of "Chu the Ninth" (Ming pretender) | Republic of China | Yellow Way Society | Suppression of the rebellion | | |
| 1920 | Hutsul Uprising | Poland | Hutsul peasants Ukrainian peasants | rebels attacked police and gendarmerie stations, disarmed them, expelled representatives of the Polish occupation authorities, seized forestries, and advocated reunification with Ukraine The regular army and police suppressed the uprising, arresting more than 250 people, most of whom were sentenced to long prison terms | | |
| 1920 | Pitchfork uprising | Russian SFSR | "Black Eagle" peasant rebels | Suppression of the rebellion | | |
| 1920 | Croatian Peasant Rebellion | Yugoslavia | Croatian peasants | Suppression of the rebellion | | |
| 1920–1922 | Tambov Rebellion | Russian SFSR | Russian peasants | Suppression of the rebellion | | |
| 1920–1926 | Spirit Soldier rebellions of eastern Sichuan and western Hubei | Republic of China | Spirit Soldier rebels, allied warlord forces | Stalemate: Large Spirit Soldier armies are destroyed, but movement persists | | |
| 1921 | Peasant Rebellion of Sorokino | Russian SFSR | Russian peasants and White Army veterans | Suppression of the rebellion | | |
| 1921 | Malabar rebellion | India | Indian peasants | Suppression of the rebellion | | |
| 1924 | Rebellion of "Wang the Sixth" (Ming pretender) | Republic of China | Wang's followers | Suppression of the rebellion | | |
| 1924 | Tatarbunary uprising | Kingdom of Romania | Ukrainian peasants Ukrainian bolsheviks | Suppression of the rebellion | | |
| 1925 | Rebellion of Chu Hung-teng (Ming pretender) | Republic of China | Heavenly Gate Society | Suppression of the rebellion | | |
| 1927 | Autumn Harvest Uprising | Republic of China | Hunan Soviet | Suppression of the rebellion | | |
| 1928–1929 | Red Spears' uprising in Shandong | Republic of China | Red Spear Society | Suppression of the rebellion | | |
| 1928–1940 | Revolts against soviet collectivisation | Soviet Union | Soviet peasants | Suppression of the revolts | | |
| 1932 | Salvadoran peasant massacre | El Salvador | Salvadoran peasants | Suppression of the rebellion | | |
| 1932 | Lesko uprising | Poland | Polish peasants | Suppression of the rebellion | | |
| 1932 | Peasant uprising against poppy-tax collection in Su County | Republic of China Kuomintang members and allied gentry | Chinese poppy farmers and gentry under Wang Xiaobai and Ma Fengshan | Suppression of the rebellion | | |
| 1932 | Peasant uprising against poppy-tax collection in Lingbi County | Republic of China | Chinese poppy farmers under Tian Xuemin | Goal of the rebellion achieved | | |
| 1936 | Miyun District rebellion | East Hebei Autonomous Council; Empire of Japan | Yellow Sand Society | Suppression of the rebellion | | |
| 1942-1943 | Green army movement in Kyiv Region | Nazi-occupiedUkrainian SSR | Ukrainian peasants Ukrainian anarchists led by Osyp Tsebrii | Tsebrii's detachment defeated in the winter of 1943 by the Nazi anti-partisan operations Tsebrii eventually captured by the Nazi occupation authorities, but not recognised and consequently imprisoned in a concentration camp Tsebrii released in the final months of the war by the Allies | | |
| 1943 | Peasant revolt in Unra | Empire of Japan | Farmers of Unra | Suppression of the rebellion | | |
| 1944 | Peasant revolt in Beichuan County | Republic of China | Chinese poppy farmers of Xiaoyuan and Houyuan | Goal of the rebellion achieved | | |
| 1944 | Peasant uprising in Indramayu | Empire of Japan | Indramayu peasants | Suppression of the rebellion | | |
| 1946–1951 | Tebhaga movement | Bengal landlords | Bengal peasants (All India Kisan Sabha) Communist Party of India | Goal of the rebellion partially achieved | | |
| 1946–1951 | Telangana Rebellion | Razakars Hyderabad landlords Hyderabad State | Hyderabad peasants (Andhra Mahasabha) Communist Party of India | Goal of the rebellion achieved | | |
| 1947–1948 | Ruili Event | Republic of China | Jingpo people poppy farmers of Ruili, Yunnan | Goal of the rebellion achieved | | |
| 1947–1954 | Hukbalahap Rebellion | Philippines | Filipino peasants (Hukbalahap) | Suppression of the rebellion | | |
| 1949 | Nankar Rebellion | Pakistan; Various Bengali Zamindars | Communist Party and Peasants Association | Goal of the rebellion achieved | | |
| 1950 | Cazin rebellion | Yugoslavia | Yugoslavian peasants | Suppression of the rebellion | | |
| 1952–1960 | Mau Mau Uprising | Kenya Colony | Kikuyu farmhanders | Suppression of the rebellion | | |
| 1958 | Rebellion at Fuzhou, Jiangxi | China | Dacheng sects | Suppression of the rebellion | | |
| 1958 | Rebellion at Yongjing | China | Rural rebels | Suppression of the rebellion | | |
| 1959 | Peasant rebellion at Sizhuang, Henan | China | "Regiment of Spirit Soldiers" | Suppression of the rebellion | | |
| 1959–1965 | Escambray Rebellion | Cuba | Cuban peasants Batista loyalists DRE United States | Suppression of the rebellion | | |
| 1960 | Rebellion at Yongnian County | China | New Star Society | Suppression of the rebellion | | |
| 1968–1969 | Agbekoya | Nigeria | Yoruba peasants | Goal of the rebellion achieved | | |
| 1969 | Rebellion at Changchun | China | Nine Palaces Way | Suppression of the rebellion | | |
| 1969 | Rebellion at Shuangyang County | China | Mount Wutai sect | Suppression of the rebellion | | |
| 1970s | 1970s peasant revolts in Thailand | Thailand | Thai peasants | Peasant leaders assassinated | | |
| 1975–1991 | Uprisings in Tigray and Eritrea; part of the Ethiopian Civil War | Ethiopia | Tigrayan and Eritrean peasants | Derg overthrown; Eritrean independence | | |
| 1994 | Zapatista uprising | Mexico | Mexican indigenous peasants | Ceasefire | | |

== See also ==
- Servile Wars
- Peasant movement
- Popular revolts in late-medieval Europe
- Maoism
- United Nations Declaration on the Rights of Peasants

== Sources ==
- Adel, Manna (2009). "Rereading the 1834 Revolt Against Muhammad Ali in Palestine and Rethinking Ottoman Rule". In Kamil Mansur; Leila Tarazi Fawaz (eds.). Transformed Landscapes: Essays on Palestine and the Middle East in Honor of Walid Khalidi. American University of Cairo Press. ISBN 978-9774162473.
- Alley, Rewi (1966). In the spirit of the Hunghu; a story of Hupeh today. Beijing: New World Press.
- Andreev, J. (1996). Българските ханове и царе. Veliko Tarnovo. ISBN 978-954-427-216-6.
- Berry, Baldwin (1962). "Peasant Revolt in Africa in the Late Roman Empire". In Lewis Thorpe (ed.). Nottingham Medieval Studies Vol. VI. W. Heffer & Sons Ltd., Cambridge.
- Berry, Mary Elizabeth (1997). The Culture of Civil War in Kyoto. University of California Press. ISBN 978-0520208773.
- Bianco, Lucien (2015). Peasants without the Party: Grassroots Movements in Twentieth Century China. Abingdon-on-Thames; New York: Routledge. ISBN 978-1563248405.
- Billingsley, Phil (1988). Bandits in Republican China. Stanford, California: Stanford University Press.
- Cheetham, Nicolas (1981). Mediaeval Greece. New Haven & London: Yale University Press. ISBN 978-0-300-10539-1.
- Cooke, Nola (September 1994). "Nineteenth-century Vietnamese Confucianization in historical perspective: evidence from the palace examinations (1463–1883)". Journal of Southeast Asian Studies. 25 (2): 270–313. doi:10.1017/S0022463400013515. S2CID 154024618.
- Daae, Ludvig (1870). Norske Bygdesagn. Cappelen. pp. 88–90.
- Dubois, Laurent (2012). Haiti: The Aftershocks of History (Paperback ed.). New York City: Picador. ISBN 9780805095623.
- Fenby, Jonathan (2008). Modern China: The Fall and Rise of a Great Power, 1850 to the Present. New York City: HarperCollins. ISBN 978-0061661167.
- Głuszko, Mariusz (2008). Bieszczady z historią i legendą w tle. Sandomierz.
- Hall, John Whitney; Toyoda, Takeshi (1977). Japan in the Muromachi Age. Berkeley: University of California Press. ISBN 978-0-520-02888-3.
- Hicks, Michael (2010). The Wars of the Roses. Yale University Press.
- Hildermeier, Manfred (2016) [1st pub. 2013]. Geschichte Russlands. Vom Mittelalter bis zur Oktoberrevolution [History of Russia. From the Middle Ages to the October Revolution] (in German) (3rd ed.). Munich: C.H. Beck. ISBN 978-3-406-64551-8.
- Iliffe, John (1979). A Modern History of Tanganyika. Cambridge: Cambridge University Press.
- Kazhdan, Alexander Petrovich (1991). "Basil the Copper Hand". In Kazhdan, Alexander Petrovich (ed.). Oxford Dictionary of Byzantium. New York and Oxford: Oxford University Press. pp. 268–269. ISBN 978-0-19-504652-6.
- Kreins, Jean-Marie (2003). Histoire du Luxembourg (in French) (3rd ed.). Paris: Presses Universitaires de France. ISBN 978-2-13-053852-3.
- Majda, Jan (1981). Literatura o Tatrach i Zakopanem (do roku 1918). Ossolineum-PAN Krakow. ISBN 978-83-04-00863-2.
- Majumdar, Asok (2011). The Tebhaga Movement : Politics of Peasant Protest in Bengal 1946–1950. Aakar Books. ISBN 978-9350021590.
- Makhno, Peter Mikhail (2014). Crown Whims and Farmers' Endurance; Militarization, Over-Taxation and Farmers' Resistance in Denmark–Norway ca. 1500–1800. Nisus Publications.
- Murray, David (1905). Japan. G.P. Putnam's Sons.
- Otani, Chojun (1968). Le mouvement insurrectionnel des Ikko-Ikki, adeptes de la secte Bouddhique Shin-Shu au XVème et au XVIème siècle. École pratique des hautes études.
- Pascu, Ștefan (1984). Revoluția populară de sub conducerea lui Horea. București: Editura Militară. pp. 534–537.
- Perry, Elizabeth J. (1980). Rebels and Revolutionaries in North China, 1845–1945. Stanford, California: Stanford University Press.
- Pipes, Richard (1993). Russia under the Bolshevik regime. A.A. Knopf. ISBN 9780394502427.
- Raun, Toivo (2001). Estonia and the Estonians. Hoover Press. ISBN 978-0-8179-2852-0.
- Rotger, Agnès (2011). Pagesos contra nobles. Barcelona: Sàpiens.
- Smith, S.A. (2015). "Redemptive Religious Societies and the Communist State, 1949 to the 1980s". In Jeremy Brown; Matthew D. Johnson (eds.). Maoism at the Grassroots: Everyday Life in China's Era of High Socialism. Cambridge, Massachusetts: Harvard University Press. pp. 340–364. ISBN 978-0674287204.
- Somers, Robert M. (1979). "The end of the T'ang". In Denis C. Twitchett (ed.). The Cambridge History of China Volume 3: Sui and T'ang China, 589–906 AD, Part One. Cambridge University Press. ISBN 978-0521214469.
- Sugiyama, Shigeki J. (1994). "Honganji in the Muromachi-Sengoku Period: Taking Up the Sword and its Consequences" (PDF). Pacific World. 2 (10): 56–74. Archived from the original (PDF) on 29 April 2014.
- Sumption, Jonathan (2009). The Hundred Years War: Divided Houses. University of Pennsylvania Press. ISBN 978-0-8122-4223-2.
- Suter, Andreas, ed. (2004). Kollektive Erinnerungen an historische Ereignisse – Chancen und Gefahren. Der Bauernkrieg als Beispiel. Zürich: Orell Füssli Verlag. pp. 146–155. ISBN 978-3-280-06020-9.
- Tai, Hsüan-chih (1985). The Red Spears, 1916–1949. Ann Arbor, Michigan: Centre for Chinese Studies Publications, University of Michigan.
- Thomson, John A.F. (1983). The Transformation of Medieval England 1370–1529. Longman.
- Vahtre, Sulev (1960). Bartholomäus Hoeneke: Liivimaa noorem riimkroonika. Eesti Riiklik Kirjastus.
- Wakabayashi, Bob T.; Brook, Timothy. (2000), Opium Regimes: China, Britain, and Japan, 1839–1952, Berkeley: University of California Press, ISBN 978-0-520-22009-6
- Xing, Hansan; Li, Guoqiang (1991). "Yudong huangdao hui qiyi" [The uprising of the Huangdao Hui in east Henan in 1911]. Shixue Yuekan (Journal of Historical Science) (in Chinese). 5: 64–69.
- Żygulski, Zdzisław; Wielecki, Henryk. (1988). Polski mundur wojskowy. Kraków: Krakjowa Agencja Wydawnicza. ISBN 978-8303014832.
- Morning Tribune Staff (30 July 1936). "Yellow Sand Cult to be suppressed by Japanese". Morning Tribune. Vol. 1, no. 154. Peiping. p. 9.
- The China Monthly Review Staff (20 August 1936). "'Yellow Sand' Society Suppressed by Japanese in Demilitarized Zone". The China Monthly Review. Vol. 77. Custom House, Shanghai. p. 473.
