= Green Army =

Green Army may refer to:

- Ealing Trailfinders Rugby Club
- Green Army men
- Green armies (1917–1922), armed peasant groups which fought against all governments in the Russian Civil War.
- Green Guard (1942–1943), an anarchist guerrilla group that fought in occupied Ukraine during World War II.
- Green Standard Army
- Plymouth Argyle F.C.
- Yeovil Town F.C.
- Lommel United
- Blyth Spartans A.F.C.
- Zambia National Service
- Circassian Green Army
