= Livny Uprising =

Russian Soviet Socialist Republic

- Part of Russian Civil War
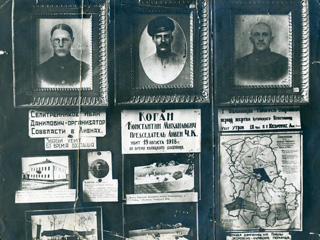
- Photo of a stand in the Livensky History Museum, dedicated to the events of the Livny Uprising, taken in 1936
Date	August 1918
Location	Livny, Oryol Oblast
Result	Bolshevik victory

Belligerents
Russian Soviet Socialist Republic	Insurgents

Commanders and leaders
(Russian Socialist Federative Soviet Republic) Ivan Selitrennikov † (Russian Socialist Federative Soviet Republic) Konstantin Kogan † (Russian Socialist Federative Soviet Republic) Dmitry Prikazchikov (Russian Socialist Federative Soviet Republic) Mikhail Burov	V. Mokashov †; J. Chernsky †; I. Fursov †; Ivan Klyopov

Units involved
	c. 10,000

Casualties and losses
c. 70 deaths	c. 300 deaths

The Livny Uprising in August 1918 was one of the first peasant insurrections to arise against the Russian Soviet Socialist Republic.

The uprising, in which about 10 thousand people took part, was caused by the peasants' rejection of the policy of war communism and requisitioning by the Bolsheviks, and the intelligentsia's rejection of the complete transfer of power into the hands of the Bolsheviks. The culmination of the peasant uprising was the capture of the town of Livny by the rebels, which they held for less than two days. The uprising was suppressed with the help of reinforcements sent from Oryol.

== History ==
Livny was a city surrounded by wheat-producing territories, in the middle of the trade routes between Moscow, Kursk, Voronezh and Oriol. There were also a small dairy and flour-producing industries and a railway repair shop. Most of the inhabitants were villagers, of whom 70% were poor, 20% lived between misery and some prosperity and 10% were kulaks.

After the October Revolution, the Bolsheviks easily took control of Oriol Oblast, where the city of Livny was. They tried to win the support of the rural population by founding Poor Peasant Committees to govern them, which was strongly resisted. The final spark was given by the forced seizure of grain carried out within the framework of war communism, which initiated a policy of ruthless persecution against all opponents and punishments against any village that resisted.

At the beginning of August 1918 Ivan Klyopov, a Left SR and former Soviet official, led a local peasant revolt against Bolshevik rule. A force of 10,000 to 12,000 villagers stormed Livny on 18 August. The Bolsheviks in the city were barely 200 plus two machine guns; they resisted but had to retreat to the train station, which was besieged and fell the next day.

On 20 August Cheka forces, international brigades, a cavalry squadron, two infantry detachments and an armored train armed with a 3-inch cannon and two machine guns, arrived from Oriol. They reached Livny, dispersed the mob that confronted them, arrested and shot several leaders. Reports speak of at least 70 Bolsheviks and 300 rebels killed. Klyopov was able to escape but was never heard from again.

This uprising is often considered a bunt, a brief, punctual and insignificant revolt. However, it was a sign of a war brewing between the peasantry and the new Soviet state. Large-scale rebellions in the countryside began only a year later, and the real war between the two began after the defeat of the White Movement in 1920.

== See also ==
- Bibliography of the Russian Revolution and Civil War
- Outline of the Russian Revolution and Civil War
- Index of articles related to the Russian Revolution and Civil War
- The "Russian" Civil Wars, 1916–1926: Ten Years That Shook the World
- Russia in Flames: War, Revolution, Civil War, 1914–1921
- Russia in Revolution: An Empire in Crisis, 1890 to 1928
- Russia: Revolution and Civil War, 1917—1921
- The Russian Revolution: A New History
- Green armies
- Tambov Rebellion
- Makhnovshchina

== Bibliography ==
=== Literature ===
- Oleynikova, A.P. (1998). Века над Окой (in Russian). Oryol: Издательство Орловской государственной телерадиовещательной компании. pp. 82–89. ISBN 5-86615-049-2.
- Vorobyova, V.; Emelyanov, I.; Kostritsa, A. (1976). Край наш Орловский (in Russian). Vol. II. Tula: Приокское книжное издательство. pp. 24–40.
- Werth, Nicolas (1999). The Black Book of Communism. Harvard University Press. ISBN 978-0-674-07608-2.

=== Further reading ===
- Kovalev, Y. (1991). Livny (in Russian). Tula: Приокское книжное издательство.
- Selitrennikov, Dm. (1989). Мятеж в Ливнах. Из истории становления Советской власти и большевистской организации в Орловском крае (in Russian). Tula: Приокское книжное издательство.
- Jakubson, Oleg (2010). "Антибольшевистское восстание в Ливнах в августе 1918 года". In А. В. Тихомирова (ed.). Страницы истории Гражданской войны на Орловщине (in Russian). Oryol: Православное молодёжное братство во имя Св. Великомученика и Победоносца Георгия. pp. 49–54.
- Taratujin, Konstantín (19 September 2006). "Крестьянское восстание в Ливенском уезде Орловской губернии в августе 1918 года" (in Russian). Русская линия.
