= Sheksna uprising =

Sheksna Uprising
- Part of the Russian Civil War
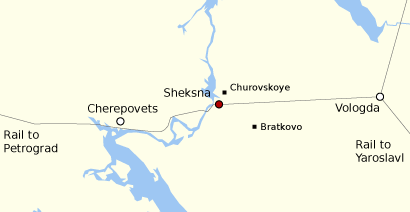
Date	December 1, 1918 – December 4, 1918
Location	by the Sheksna River in the Vologda Governorate and Cherepovets Governorate, Russian SFSR
Result	Soviet (Bolshevik) victory

Belligerents
Green armies	(Russian Soviet Federative Socialist Republic) Russian SFSR

Commanders and leaders
A. F. Baraev ("Shershen"); A. Korchagin; Sokolov; A. Lokhichev; K. Lokhichev; Belov	(Russian Soviet Federative Socialist Republic) L. S. Nasedkin (Russian Soviet Federative Socialist Republic) Y. M. Brook (Russian Soviet Federative Socialist Republic) B. Y. Korolyev (Russian Soviet Federative Socialist Republic) I. I. Kozlov

Strength
Approx. 300	Unknown

Casualties and losses
Unknown	Over 50

The Sheksna uprising (Russian: Пришексни́нское восста́ние, romanized: Prisheksninskoye Vostaniye) was an anti-Bolshevik uprising in townships on the Sheksna River in the Vologda and Cherpovets provinces between 1–3 December 1918. The rebels seized the railway station Sheksna and broke railway communication on the Cherepovets-Vologda line, jeopardizing messages to Petrograd. The uprising was suppressed by Red Army troops arriving from Vologda and Cherpovets.

== Background ==
The Sheksna Uprising was part of a wave of peasant uprisings that swept over Central Russia between November and December 1918. At that time, uprisings occurred at 138 of 268 counties under Bolshevik control. The primary reason for the uprisings was the peasants' discontent with the War Communist system's management of villages. The peasants in the rural districts involved in the Sheksna Uprising were dissatisfied with the excesses of local food detachments, and the deterioration of the economic situation in the villages.

The front of the Russian Civil War was just north of the Vologda Governorate, leading to the Soviet government to intensify its mobilization measures: in addition to conscripting the local population to the Red Army, the government took away horses which were crucial for the peasant economy.

The uprising was led by wealthy peasants whom the Soviet government labeled as Kulaks. Many were executed, while others were deprived of their civil rights.

== Beginning of the Uprising ==
On December 1, 1918, peasant uprisings began in the Pochinok, Charomskoy, Ust-Uholka, First and Second Petrinevskoy, Yaganovskoy, Pachevskoy, Ivanovo, and Dargunskoy Bratkovsky volosts of the Vologda and Cherpovets Uyezds.

Researchers identify three possible initial centers of the uprising:

- The village Bratkovo (most likely center)
- The village Churovskoye
- The village Bolshoi Pochinok

On that evening in the village Bratkovo, the peasants passed a resolution:

1) The meeting recognizes the rule of the Soviets, but not in its present form. Right now, the rule is not by the People but by some handful, and 2) Russia is surrounded by a tight ring of hostile foreign forces that are impossible for us to combat, and they will not mobilize people for this slaughter

The organizers of the uprising sent this message around the village of the neighboring volosts, where the peasants were passing similar resolutions.

During their uprisings on December 1, the rebels defeated the executive committees at Bratkovsky, Pochinkovsky, Churovsky, and Ust-Uholka, and the military commissariat at Dargunovsky. Mobilization lists were destroyed, stationary cases were looted, and party and Komsomol activists and employees of the executive committees were arrested. On the same day some 300 rebels rushed to the train station Sheksna.

== Taking the Station ==
The rebels clashed with the 1st regiment of the 8th detachment of the railway guard, consisting of 70 people whose resistance was quickly broken. Moreover, the squadron instructor ensign Belov defected to the rebels and led the revolt. The rebels dismantled 170 meters of railway track, disarmed the guards, toppled several telegraph poles, and broke the telegraph lines. The railway itself was blockaded by old railroad ties and rail. The railway bridge over the Sheksna was taken under the protection of the rebels, and the movement of trains between Vologda and Cherepovets was interrupted. The authorities feared that the rebels would blow up the bridge, cutting rail connections with Petrograd.

The rebels killed 50 of the 70 soldiers in the 1st regiment. Others went over to the rebels. The weapons seized from the disarmed regiment and military enlistment offices were added to existed weapons cached in cellars. At this point, the rebels had a large number of rifles, grenades, and a few machine guns. The rebels also staged an ambush near the station Barbach, from which they could bombard incoming trains delivering Red Army units.

== Suppression of the Uprising ==
Considerable forces were put towards the suppression of the uprising. The plan was to block the station from two sides: from Vologda and Cherepovets. By the evening of December 1, a detachment was formed in Cherepovets consisting of the Red Army and the local railway guard battalion regiment (about 100 people). The detachment was led by the provincial military commissar V. Y. Korolev, and the commissar of the detachment was I. Kozlov.

An armored train under the name "Stepan Razin", summoned from Yaroslavl via Vologda, carried heavily armed soldiers and a cavalry unit commanded by the chief of the railway Gubchek Y. M. Brook. The general management of the Red Army troops from Vologda was done by the head of the Northern Railway defense Prologin. At the same time, armed troops were sent to the county townships.

On December 2, the troops from Vologda and Cherepovets came close to the station Sheksna. On this day, a train with a detachment from Cherepovets arrived at the Ust Uholka railway crossing and was ambushed by the rebels. Unable to proceed, the train turned back towards Cherepovets to support artillery. The Red Army troops tried to capture the village Kurovo, where they believed the leaders of the rebels were hiding. However, they changed their route when they faced resistance from the village.

On December 3, the village Bratkova, one of the most important strongholds of the rebel, was captured. The rebels in the village were dispersed, and the Red Army troops held captive were freed. Early in the morning, troops from Vologda and Cherepovets stormed the station Sheksna. By the afternoon, the station was captured, the leader of the rebellion Belov disappeared, and railroad tracks were restored. At night, the Gubchek chief Y. M. Brook arrived at the station.

On December 4, the nearby counties and points along the railway were swept. The most active participants in the uprising were arrested, and its leaders were shot by the decree of a military field tribunal. Among the executed were V. Ochelenkov, T. Tsvetkov, I. Veschezerov, F. Belolikov, the brothers A. and K. Lohichevy, the guard Chistotkin, and the peasant Kudryavtsev.

On December 19, a wave of arrests swept the Vologda county. Among the arrested was the squadron instructor Belov who led the uprising at its final stage.

== See also ==
- Bibliography of the Russian Revolution and Civil War
- Outline of the Russian Revolution and Civil War
- Index of articles related to the Russian Revolution and Civil War
- The "Russian" Civil Wars, 1916–1926: Ten Years That Shook the World
- Russia in Flames: War, Revolution, Civil War, 1914–1921
- Russia in Revolution: An Empire in Crisis, 1890 to 1928
- Russia: Revolution and Civil War, 1917—1921
- The Russian Revolution: A New History
