= Saxon Peasants' Revolt =

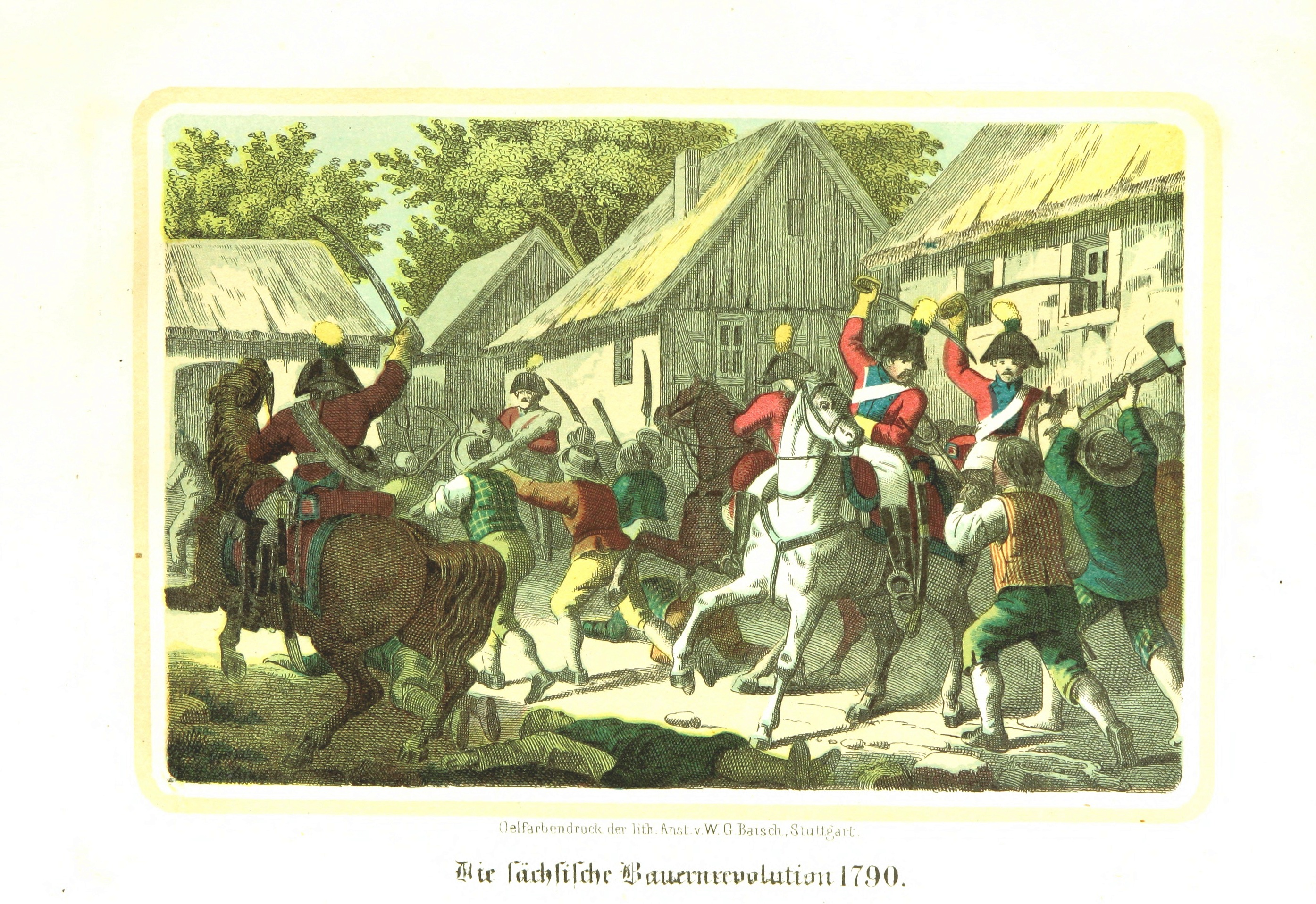
The Saxon Peasants' Revolt of 1790

The Saxon Peasants' Revolt (German: Sächsischer Bauernaufstand or kursächsischer Bauernaufstand) of 1790 was a military conflict between the nobility and the peasants. The hot spots of the insurrection were large areas around Dresden, Leipzig and Zwickau.

The disputes over hunting rights within gamekeeping reserves established by the nobility initially led to unrest in game in Wehlen, which rapidly spread to other districts (Ämter). However, the government in Saxony was able to bring these riots under control by early July. The previous harsh winter of 1789/1790 and the drought in 1790, however, increased the potential for conflict. So in the summer of 1790, more and more peasants rebelled against the Saxon state, the revolt being centred on Wechselburg. One of the best known spokesmen for the peasants was Christian Benjamin Geißler, also called "the Rebel of Liebstadt" ("Rebell von Liebstadt"). By mid-August, the farmers had taken control of fifteen patrimonial court districts, covering an area of 5,000 square kilometres.

The areas around Stolpen, Dresden, Radeberg, Dippoldiswalde, the two Lusatias and Torgau were now affected by the uprising. The riots took place in a disorganized and very spontaneous manner. Thus, in the area of Königstein and in Upper Lusatia labour was withdrawn. There were even assaults on castles and Saxon military units were disarmed by the peasants. On 23 August in Meissen, 2,000 peasants, armed with flails, clubs and axes, forced the release of imprisoned rebels.

The main demands of the peasants were the abolition of hunting privileges, the abolition of socage, the prohibition of the conversion of contributions in kind into financial interest by the lords or Saxon district offices. Initially the peasants succeeded in getting the lords to waiver all duties, socage and interest. Some lords were even expelled by their peasants. But a major military operation in September 1790 finally overthrew the rebellion.

== Sources ==
- Siegfried Hoyer: Die Ideen der Französischen Revolution und der kursächsische Bauernaufstand 1790, Neues Archiv für sächsische Geschichte, 65th vol., 1994, p. 61-76
- Christian Richter: Der sächsische Bauernaufstand von 1790 im Spiegel der marxistisch-leninistischen Geschichtsschreibung der DDR GRIN Verlag 2008, ISBN 978-3-640-24667-0
- Daniel Jacob:Kurfürst Friedrich August der Gerechte und der sächsische Bauernaufstand von 1790 ISBN 978-3-638-36415-7
- Michael Wagner:Der sächsische Bauernaufstand und die Französische Revolution in der Perzeption der Zeitgenossen, in Geschichte und Gesellschaft. Sonderheft, Vol. 12, Soziale Unruhen in Deutschland während der Französischen Revolution (1988)
