= Pitchfork uprising =

Uprising during the Russian Civil War

Pitchfork Uprising
- Part of Left-wing uprisings against the Bolsheviks
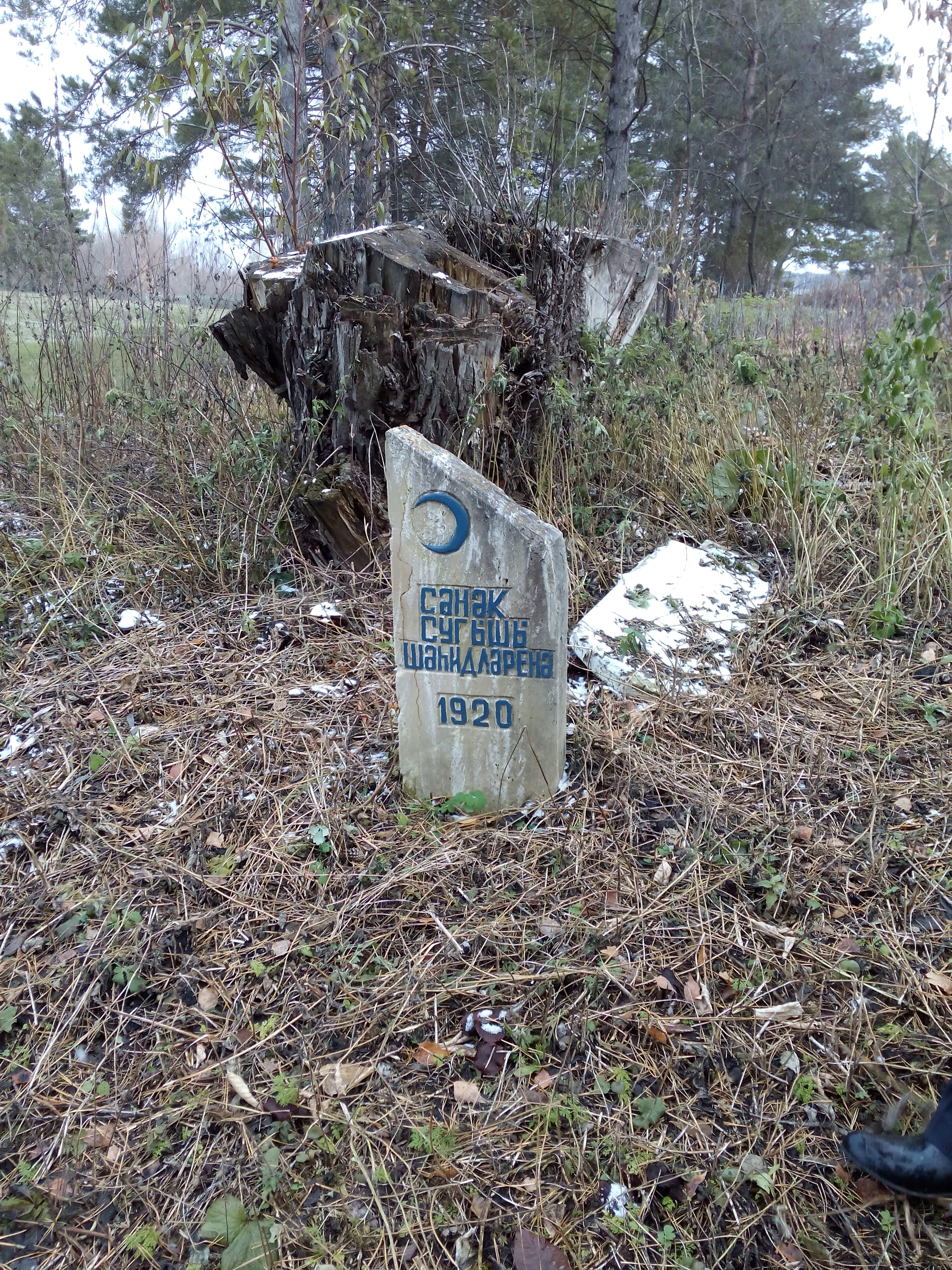
- Tombstone on the mass grave of the Red Army punitive expedition victims during the suppression of the Pitchfork uprising
Date	February 4 – mid-March, 1920
Location	Ufa Governorate, Russian SFSR
Result	Red Army victory

Belligerents
Peasant rebels	(Russian Soviet Federative Socialist Republic) Red Army

Commanders and leaders
I. Milovanov	(Russian Soviet Federative Socialist Republic) Miñlegäräy Äxmätşin

Strength
50,000	N/A

Casualties and losses
3,000	800

The Pitchfork Uprising of 1920, also known as Black Eagle Uprising, was a peasant uprising against the Soviet policy of the war communism in what is today Eastern Tatarstan and Western Bashkortostan. It started in the village of Yanga Yelan, Menzelinsky Uyezd, Ufa Governorate on February 4, 1920, where local peasants tried to resist confiscation of their food. When they refused to give up their produce, the leader of the military food requisitioning unit ("prodotryad") arrested some of them. Peasants asked him to free the hostages, but he refused. Peasants killed the members of prodotryad and circulated the appeal to rise.

On February 9 the chairman of Menzelinsk committee and the chief of Zainsk militia were killed in Yanga Yelan. On February 10 the peasants killed the Soviet representative in Zainsk. The uprising spread to the Belebeysky, Birsky uyezds of the Ufa Governorate, Chistopolsky Uyezd of the Kazan Governorate, Bugulminsky Uyezd of the Samara Governorate. The staff of the uprising was found under I. Milovanov. Their slogans were Down with the communist and the Civil War; long live the Constituent Assembly!

The peasant army known as "Black Eagle" counted 50,000 rebels. However, they were armed only with pitchforks, axes, and spades, which gave the name to the uprising. Troops for the Internal Defense of the Republic (Cheka) used heavy machine guns and artillery against them. In a few days (mid-March 1920) thousands of rebels were killed and hundreds of villages burned. The casualty count was approximately 800 Soviet troops and more than 3,000 peasant rebels.
