= Osip Tsebriy =

Ukrainian anarchist partisan

- Осип Цебрій
- Born: Osip Vasylovych Tsebriy; Tartak, Zhmerynka district, Kyiv province, Russian Empire (modern-day Ukraine)
- Died: c. 1958; United States
- Military career
- Allegiance: Makhnovshchina
- Service: Tartak partisans (1918–1920); Revolutionary Insurgent Army of Ukraine (1920–1921); Green Army (1942–1943)
- Conflicts: Ukrainian War of Independence; World War II

Osip Vasylovych Tsebriy (Ukrainian: Осип Васильович Цебрій) was a Ukrainian anarchist partisan that was born in the Kyiv region. In 1918, Tsebriy joined his local partisan detachment to fight against the occupation of Ukraine by the Imperial German Army. He then went on to continue fighting against various other armed forces, including the Volunteer Army, Ukrainian People's Army and Red Army. In 1920, he joined up with the Revolutionary Insurgent Army of Ukraine (RIAU) and participated in Makhnovist operations until its defeat the following year. He then escaped to Yugoslavia, where he organised a Rusyn village into an anarchist commune. In 1927, his village was attacked and Tsebriy was expelled from Yugoslavia for his anarchist activism. Following the outbreak of World War II, Tsebriy returned to Ukraine and organised a partisan detachment to fight against the Nazi occupation. His detachment was defeated and Tsebriy was imprisoned in a concentration camp. After the war, he emigrated to the United States, where he wrote his memoirs and contributed to the magazine Delo truda.

== Biography ==
Osip Vasylovych Tsebriy was born in the village of Tartak, in the Zhmerynka district of the Kyiv Governorate of the Russian Empire (modern-day Ukraine). His father, Vasyl Hryhorivych Tsebriy, was a soldier in the Imperial Russian Army. During his time stationed in Petrograd, Vasyl Tsebriy joined the Russian anarchist movement. After he returned to Tartak, he became the leading figure of the revolutionary movement in the village, reorganising the village into a commune and bringing land under collective ownership. When the Imperial German Army invaded and occupied Ukraine in 1917, the peasants of Tartak established a partisan detachment and fought against the newly established Ukrainian State. Osip Tsebriy himself joined the detachment and went underground to wage a partisan war against the Central Powers. According to Tsebriy, the peasant partisans hid their rifles and machine guns in wheat fields, which allowed them to launch surprise attacks against patrolling German troops or Ukrainian collaborators. The peasants would then themselves alert the authorities about the attack, which they attributed to "a detachment of origins unknown".

After the Central Powers withdrew from Ukraine, the detachment continued to defend their village against each of the armed forces that attempted to occupy the country. From early 1919, Osip Tsebriy led his detachment in battle against the Volunteer Army, the Ukrainian People's Army and later against the Red Army. In the autumn of 1920, the Polish Land Forces and Ukrainian People's Army retreated from Ukraine and the Red Army occupied the regions of Kyiv and Podillia. Tsebriy's father dispatched him and his small detachment to aid the Makhnovshchina, which was about to come under attack by the Red Army. In October 1920, he and his detachment set off to join the Revolutionary Insurgent Army of Ukraine (RIAU). At the village of Yaroshivka, Tsebriy's detachment linked up with a Makhnovist partisan group and headed towards Kharkiv. Along the way, they fought a Red Army detachment in Dachevo and disarmed Soviet police in Piatygory. They then waited out the winter in Tetiiv, where they were given shelter by local peasants and helped out in agricultural work. At this time, Tsebriy complained that the Makhnovshchina was largely unable to radicalise the Ukrainian peasantry, as they lacked anarchist thinkers and propagandists capable of communicating their ideology to peasants. He also wrote of how Halyna Kuzmenko was well known for executing rapists.

By early 1921, Tsebriy's detachment had grown to 500 partisans and they established contact with Nestor Makhno. They then headed towards Znamianka, but sustained heavy casualties following a series of engagements with the Red Army. In the summer of 1921, they finally linked up with the core Makhnovist detachment led by Viktor Bilash. Following the defeat of the Makhnovshchina later that year, Tsebriy and two of his comrades fled Ukraine. He escaped to Poland, then moved on to Austria, before finally finding refuge in Yugoslavia.

By November 1922, Tsebriy had settled in the Bosnian village of Rosavats, which was largely inhabited by Rusyns. He found work there as a schoolteacher, teaching children during the day and adults in the evening. Following a decision by a popular assembly, in January 1923, Tsebriy oversaw the reorganisation the local economy along the lines of anarchist communism. Under Tsebriy's oversight, the Rosavats commune provided employment for recovering alcoholics, built up its agricultural, industrial and service economies, and constructed new commercial and residential buildings. The commune, which consisted of roughly 500 people, had full employment and provided its inhabitants with all their necessities. The commune ultimately lasted for less than 5 years. In 1927, the village was attacked by White émigrés, who re-established its police station and local church and broke up collective land into private property. Tsebriy himself was arrested and imprisoned in the Yugoslav capital of Belgrade. After a week in prison, he was deported from the country. He clandestinely fled to Austria before moving on to France.

=== World War II ===
Following the outbreak of World War II, Nazi Germany invaded and occupied Ukraine. In 1942, Tsebriy clandestinely returned to his home country and established a green army to fight against both the Wehrmacht and Soviet Army in the Kyiv Oblast. During this period, Tsebriy attempted to revive Ukrainian anarchism as an independent force, fighting for "bread and freedom" for the peasantry. But in the winter of 1943, his detachment was defeated by the Nazi anti-partisan operations. Tsebriy went into hiding, with local peasants providing him shelter for some months. Tsebriy was eventually captured by the Nazi occupation authorities, but he was not recognised and consequently imprisoned in a concentration camp. In the final months of the war, Tsebriy was released by the Allies who liberated his concentration camp.

After the war, Tsebriy emigrated to the United States, where he contributed articles to Delo truda and wrote his memoirs. He died some time after 1958.

== Selected works ==
- Tsebry, Ossip (1993) [1949–1950]. "Memories of a Makhnovist Partisan". Delo truda – Probuzhdenie. No. 31–32. Translated by Sharkey, Paul. Kate Sharpley Library – via The Anarchist Library.

== Bibliography ==
- Allison, Charlie (2023). No Harmless Power: The Life and Times of the Ukrainian Anarchist Nestor Makhno. PM Press. ISBN 978-1-62963-471-5.
- Damier, Vadim (November 1998). "Fate of the Makhnovist". Прямое действие. Translated by Riltok. Confederation of Revolutionary Anarcho-Syndicalists.
- Damier, Vadim (2009) [2000]. Anarcho-syndicalism in the 20th Century. Translated by Archibald, Malcolm. Edmonton: Black Cat Press. ISBN 978-0-9737827-6-9.
- Darch, Colin (2020). Nestor Makhno and Rural Anarchism in Ukraine, 1917–1921. London: Pluto Press. ISBN 978-1786805263. OCLC 1225942343.
- Dubovik, Anatoly; Kravets, Yuri; Belash, Aleksandr, eds. (2008). "ЦЕБРИЙ Осип Васильевич" [TSEBRIY Osip Vasilyevich]. Makhno.ru (in Russian).
- Heath, Nick (11 September 2009). "Tsebry, Ossip (?-after 1958)". Libcom.org.
- Patterson, Sean (2020). Makhno and Memory: Anarchist and Mennonite Narratives of Ukraine's Civil War, 1917–1921. Manitoba: University of Manitoba Press. ISBN 978-0-88755-578-7. OCLC 1134608930.
- Skirda, Alexandre (2004) [1982]. Nestor Makhno–Anarchy's Cossack: The Struggle for Free Soviets in the Ukraine 1917–1921. Translated by Sharkey, Paul. Oakland, California: AK Press. ISBN 978-1-902593-68-5. OCLC 60602979.
