= Green armies =

Army/faction in the Russian Civil War

- Leaders: Ivan Klyopov (Livny); Danylos Terpylo (Trypillia); Nykyfor Hryhoriv (Kherson); Alexander Antonov (Tambov)
- Dates active: 1918–1922
- Active regions: Throughout Russia and Ukraine
- Ideology: Agrarianism; Anti-Bolshevism; Factions: Agrarian socialism Neo-narodism; Anarchism; Revolutionary socialism Nationalism
- Political position: Left-wing
- Size: 70,000 (peak)
- Wars: Russian Civil War

The Green armies (Russian: Зеленоармейцы, romanized: Zelenoarmeytsy), also known as the Green Army (Russian: Зелёная армия, romanized: Zelyonaya armiya) or Greens (Russian: Зелёные, romanized: Zelyonyye), were armed peasant groups which fought against all governments in the Russian Civil War from 1918 to 1922. The Green armies were semi-organized local militias that opposed the Bolsheviks, Whites, and foreign interventionists, and fought to protect their communities from requisitions or reprisals carried out by third parties. The Green armies were politically and ideologically neutral, but at times associated with the Socialist-Revolutionary Party. The Green armies had at least tacit support throughout much of Russia. However, their primary base, the peasantry, were largely reluctant to wage an active campaign during the Russian Civil War and, with an impending Bolshevik victory, dissolved in 1922.

== Background ==
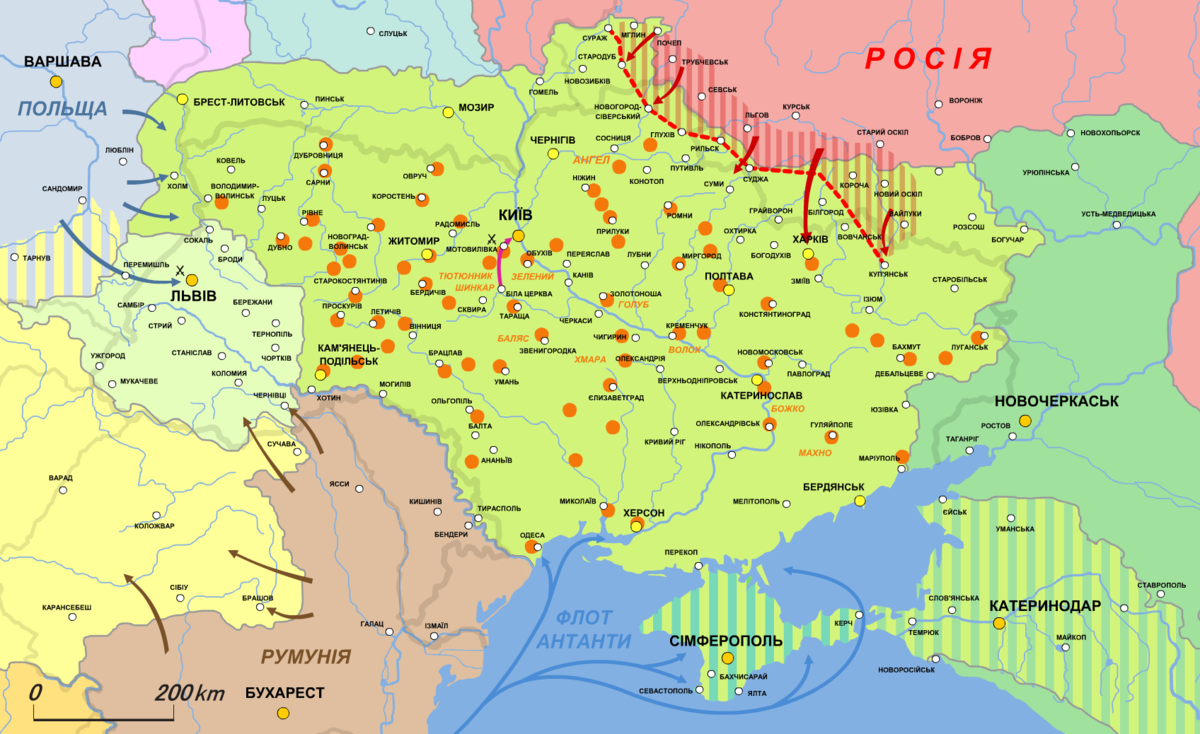
Map of the Ukrainian People's Republic between May and November 1918, under the Hetmanate (light green). The orange circles mark the locations of the main peasant rebellions. Crimea and Kuban are under the control of the White Army. The main ports of the Black Sea are occupied by the French intervention. Map depicts the Second Polish Republic and its offensives in western Ukraine (dark blue), Belarusian People's Republic (light blue), West Ukrainian People's Republic (lemon green), Kingdom of Romania and their expansionist attempts to the west (brown), the Austro-Hungarian Empire on the brink of collapse (yellow), the Russian Soviet Federative Socialist Republic with its attacks from the north (red), Lithuania (pink) and the Don Cossacks (dark green). Modern day borders have been superimposed.

The Russian peasantry lived through two wars against the Russian state, the product of revolutions that ended with state victory: 1905–1907 and 1917–1922. At the beginning of 1918, the Bolshevik Party only controlled a few cities, "unique Bolshevik islets in the middle of a peasant ocean" unwilling to hand over the fruits of their labor and submit to any external authority.

The conflict between the cities and a countryside was one of the main edges of the civil war. This resistance was interpreted by many as a mere expression of the "social anarchy" that existed in the country. The Communist influence on the peasants and workers was negligible. The Bolsheviks controlled some soviets, but without coercive power over the majority of the population, who opposed them in a passive and disorganized way.

Between late 1917 and early 1918, there was no serious opposition to the Bolsheviks, who controlled central Russia, Baku and Tashkent. The only opposition force was the Volunteer Army (Russian: Добровольческая армия ), barely 3,000 men, still organized in southern Russia. All the White movement's hopes were on winning over the Don and Kuban Cossacks, who were initially more interested in obtaining their own independence. For their part, Ukraine and Finland were in the process of becoming independent, but the Whites refused to recognize their secession. Only the violent Bolshevik repression of the Cossacks in early 1918 made it possible to win them over to the White cause.

After the October Revolution, the new Bolshevik authorities enacted a policy of war communism. This system sought to abolish all private enterprise, maximize state control over distribution and the foreign market, nationalize all heavy industry, requisition agricultural surplus, and impose a universal rationing system to focus the entire economy on supporting the war effort. It was a way of fighting their opponents on the "home front". Among the new measures was the dispatch of officials to the farms of central Russia to collect supplies for the Red Army and start the construction of the socialist economy, by any means necessary. The aim was to requisition grain, cattle and horses, recruit young people to the army, and punish villages suspected of harboring deserters.

The farmers' first reaction was to bury their grain, feed it to cattle, or clandestinely distill it into alcohol. In response, the Bolsheviks organized a 'supply army' of 80,000 men tasked with forcibly requisitioning grain surpluses. Half were unemployed workers from Petrograd who were looking for a fixed salary and to keep some of the loot. The rest were criminals, other unemployed and ex-soldiers. They formed undisciplined troops, known as prodotriady (Russian: продотряды), who did not hesitate to steal vital reserves, seed and other possessions from the peasants. The prodotriady were killed at an increasing rate: 2,000 in 1918, 5,000 in 1919, and 8,000 in 1920. The Bolsheviks retaliated by burning villages, confiscating livestock, and executing peasants by the hundreds. Many were accused of being kulaks but most were poor farmers, the most vulnerable to poor harvests. People fled to the forests with nothing to lose and joined the rebels to defend the "local peasant revolution". Thus, what in most cases began as small revolts against the requisitions, the incompetent and brutal response of the local Communists turned into large rebellions.

The first collectivizations also generated great resistance due to forced transfers and the new ways of life that were imposed. Many units and inspectors exceeded their powers, looting houses and murdering villagers. They harshly repressed any sign of resistance. All of this contributed to widespread resentment against the new regime. The Bolsheviks understood that they had to control the grain supply and, in order not to depend on the small farmers, they tried to found Kolkhoz (cooperatives) and Sovkhoz (state farms). Another source of the peasantry's rejection of the Bolsheviks was the abolition of the Committees of Poor Peasants or komitety bednoty (Russian: Комитеты Бедноты) in December 1918, but Lenin had foreseen fierce resistance and increased both the size of the prodotriady and the tax requirement. The following season, some 242 million pud of grain was requisitioned.

== Objectives ==
At the outbreak of the February Revolution, the most important political parties were the Social Revolutionary Party, Mensheviks, and Kadets. The first two controlled most of the country's soviets, except the ones in Petrograd and Moscow; the third were liberals with the support of moderate sectors who wanted to maintain the freedoms won with the revolution. The Mensheviks quickly lost the support of many soviets, except in the Caucasus, and especially in the Democratic Republic of Georgia, while Bolshevik influence rapidly grew. The peasants were overwhelmingly in favour of the SR. In some cases, as in Western Siberia in 1920–1921, the rebellious peasants began their revolts without any proposal or plan more complex than overthrowing the Bolsheviks (consequently, Bolsheviks who fell into their hands were assassinated and government or Party buildings razed). Only as some successful movements became more complex and territorially broad did the Greens present a political program, an adaptation of SR ideas.

Russia rapidly polarized during 1917. Very soon, large masses of the population were in favor of smaller and less organized revolutionary groups than the Bolsheviks, the anarchists and Left SRs. The Great War had encouraged the peasants and workers to follow a revolutionary path, so Lenin proposed to turn the "imperialist war" into a "civil war."

=== Agricultural distribution ===
The greens were driven by the ideal of the SR "black division", "a division of all lands according to the number of mouths to be fed in each family", not for the broader nationalization and collectivization of the lands as presented by the Bolsheviks. In Lenin's eyes there was nothing socialist about this measure, believing the plan of the SRs would be to establish capitalism in the countryside. This was seen as avoiding concrete Socialist policy, instituting basic programs such as improvements to peasant quality of life and an end to slavery. According to him, it was no more than a bourgeois slogan, just like "land and liberty", to appeal to the desperate peasantry of rural Russia. Another source of opposition from the population towards the Bolsheviks was the "way of life Communist leaders' feudal system," with the excesses of Bolshevik leaders in contrast to the horrors of the civil war producing resentment from the impoverished and war-torn peasantry.

The ideology of the Greens was very uniform, representing the common aspirations and goals of peasant revolutions in Russia and Ukraine. They wanted to regain the self-government maintained until 1918, seize the nobility's lands, maintain rural market-economies and govern their communities with soviets chosen by them. The peasants rejected the growing authority that the new state was gaining. Four years after the Revolution they watched as the Soviet state centralized, with the autonomy of their Soviets integrated into the growing organs of the state. Their own small agricultural holdings were replaced by large state collectivizations, with the product produced on their farms requisitioned and the land promised to them in the Revolution occupied by the State. With these worries and concerns growing, they began to accept the SR proposals: the end of Bolshevik rule, land redistribution and an end to the civil war. Their opposition to the Bolsheviks was due to, rather than a political plan or national alternative, a desire to protect and preserve their communal land. Interested in defending local interests, these movements took a defensive stance: incapable and unwilling to march on Moscow, they hoped to remove the Bolshevik state's central influence.

=== Rejection of the Whites ===
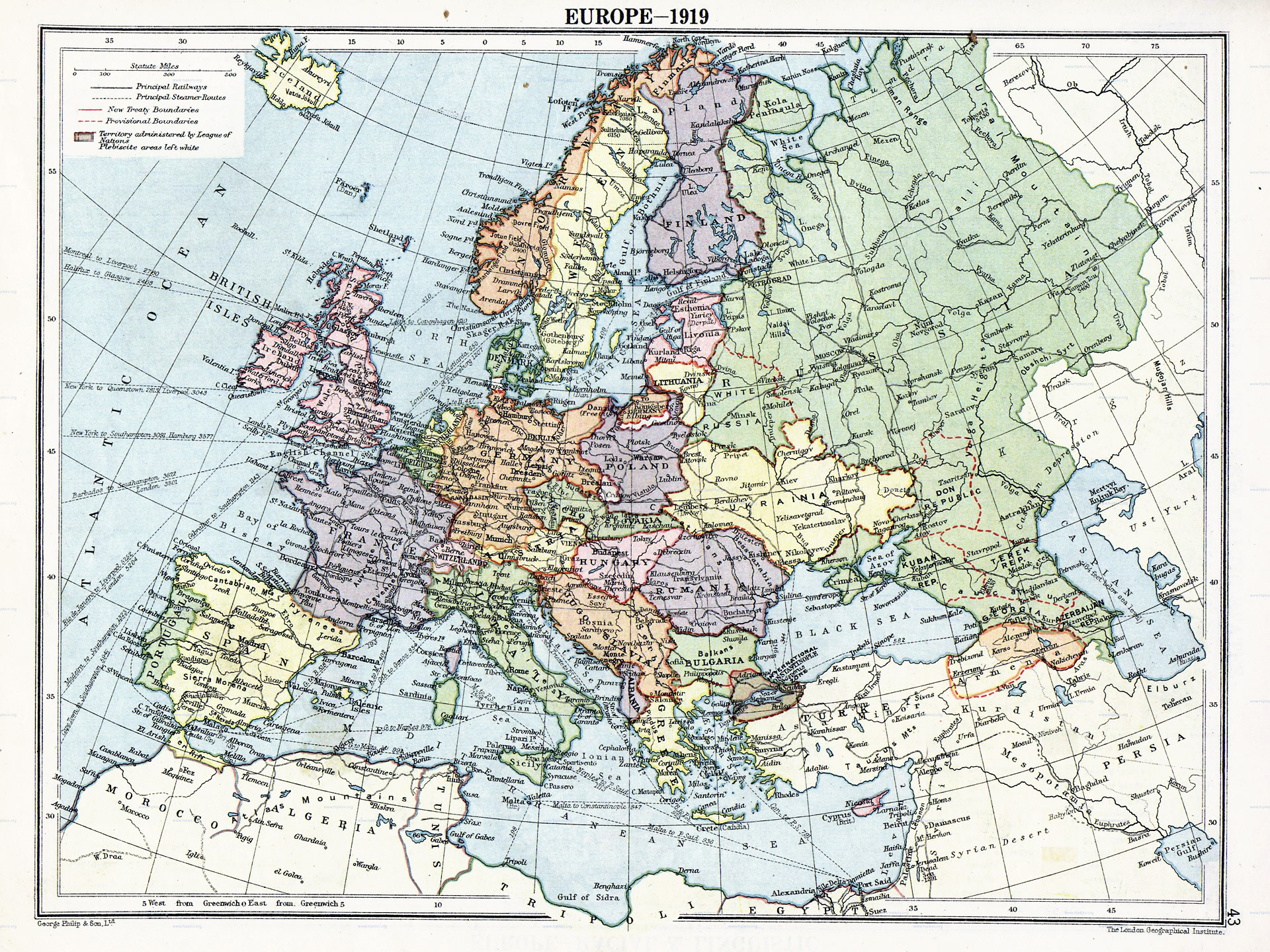
Map of Europe in 1919. After the treaties of Brest-Litovsk and Versailles. Before the treaties of Trianon, Riga and Kars. The independent territories of Poland, Ukraine, the Baltic States, Belarus, Finland, Armenia, Georgia, Azerbaijan and the Cossack republics of the Don, Kuban and Terek Cossacks.

The greens were always hostile to the Whites, which is why their uprisings against the reds only became massive after ensuring the defeat of the Whites. Many White officers were members of the former Tsarist Nobility, and had lost the land they had or could inherit in the peasant revolution of 1917. With deeply entrenched classism against the peasants they once ruled over, the Whites sought to turn back time and take revenge against every symbol of change. They would never recognize new national realities or the attempts at agrarian revolution.

One of the main causes of the White defeat was being identified by the people with the restoration of the old regime, signaled by the treatment that their officers and officials gave to the peasants. With their deeply reactionary positions desire to restore the old Tsarist social and economic order aggressive repression and rejection of the Peasant base and refusal to carry out even basic reforms demanded by the circumstances The Whites could not take advantage of the countryside's hesitance towards the Reds and win it for their cause. They refused to reform land ownership, stoking the fears of the rural majority against the prior regime and failing to take the possibly decisive advantage of rural support. That is why many peasants feared that the Whites would restore the rights of the rural nobility to the land, destroying the autonomy and local representation that they'd won in the Revolution of 1917. Faced with this fear, many peasants joined the reds when the Whites advanced on the districts of Orel and Moscow in 1919. They had through their efforts been the ones who had secured the most land from the nobility. According to SR politicians, if Alexander Kolchak had not restored the rights of landowners, he would have won greater support of farmers in the Urals and the Volga.

The robberies and massacres at the hands of the Cossack cavalry also contributed to turning the countryside against the White advance in 1919. Denikin proved unable to contain the violence. The best White troops were from the Kuban, the Don and the Caucasus, as the Cossacks were the main a source of men and resources for the Whites. When they realized that Denikin was defeated, they wanted to return to their homes en masse, seeing greater benefit in negotiating their own autonomy with the Communists. Despite everything, Denikin cracked down on the rights of the unions and returned the factories to their former owners, sparking the hatred and resistance of the workers. The Whites, unable to effectively contain the unrest, resorted to greater repression and terror. Like Kolchak, Denikin failed to create his own local government structure, resorting to repression to try to mobilize the population and its resources under his control. With these being something decisive in any modern civil or total war, he attempted to tap into these possible resources but the terror proved not to be enough to spurn the territories they held. Alongside this, it was unable to counteract the critical waste and bleed of already present supply. When the Military aid from their western allies was reduced, White soldiers had to loot for supplies, only further stoking the rage and fear of the local populace.

Finally, they failed to properly capitalize on the propaganda front. To the Whites, the peasants had a duty to serve in their armies, based primarily on the old structure of the Tsarist regime. Due to this, they saw no reason in convincing or aligning those they conscripted. On the other hand, the Bolsheviks knew how to use the symbolism of the revolution, proclaiming themselves the defenders of peasantry and smaller farmers. Paradoxically, many White commanders waited for a popular uprising against the Bolsheviks to obtain victory, but usually most of the population was hostile to both sides and indifferent to who won the war. Wrangel was the only White general to realize the mistake. He knew that the war would not be won without successfully winning over the peasants, workers and national minorities to their side. Despite this, his subordinates in Crimea behaved like an occupying army, perpetrating all manner of arbitrariness and institutionalizing corruption.

=== Cooperation with other groups ===
The Greens collaborated several times with other opposition groups, such as anarchists and SRs, in a more strategic than ideological effort against the Reds. White deserters joined their cause and came to lead bands of peasants, which served as a pretext for the Bolsheviks to exaggerate the relations between the two elements. More likely to follow aggressive rhetoric and promises of violent revenge, peasants tended to reject leaders with purely political or more moderate goals, that is, any close to the Russian Provisional Government of 1917. "They prefer to fight a desperate and lonely war on their own, rather than to help the oppressors of the past [the Whites] defeat the oppressors of the present [the reds]."

== Organisation ==
A union network emerged in the villages, replacing the Soviets and helping provide supplies to the rebels. Each village was responsible for mobilizing, feeding and equipping their own units. The Church and the local SRs, mainly from the left, were key in the organization of the movements. For example, in West Siberia the SRs led the revolts and although there was a central authority in Tobolsk, it had little to no control of the Bolshevik-free territory. Because of this, essentially every volost was self-governed. In contrast, the Siberian movement demonstrated a high level of organization and even installed an administration in the cities it captured (the guerrillas of Tambov were unable to seize cities but also created a complex administrative network in the countryside); on the contrary, the Makhnovists were present in both countryside and cities, maintaining a loose and autonomous administration in line with Anarchist ideology.

At the beginning of 1920, when the Red victory was practically assured after the defeat of the armies of Anton Denikin, Nikolai Yudenich and Aleksandr Kolchak, continued requisitioning came to be viewed as more and more unjustifiable. Numerous contingents of peasant soldiers, usually having connections and sympathy with the Peasantry, refused to repress the green uprisings and defected, forming their own "green" guerrillas in the forests. In 1919–1921 most of the guerrillas were deserters, including the leaders, with many in positions of leadership being veterans of the fight against the Whites. Alongside this, White Holdouts described as "little White dabbling" continued to fight until 1922, however were described to be "more like a permanent hindrance than a real threat." Officially two and a half million soldiers were demobilized in 1921, with many returning to their homes and joining the Greens, worsening the situation for the central government, as there were 250,000 in Tambov alone.

However, by that time both Greens and Blacks could only dream of damaging the Red Army, with its experience and size making it a true "military giant", although their armed forces (undermined by desertions) never reached official figures. They claimed; the Bolsheviks had tried to realize the French revolutionary ideal of a "nation in arms" and failed. There were just over a million red soldiers at the end of 1918, 3 million in 1919, 5 million at the end of 1920, and 6 million in 1921. They were mainly forcibly recruited peasants. There was resistance among the Communists to the massive recruitment of peasants. For many, their army of loyal workers would become a force largely made up of an element that was alien and hostile to them, a possible enemy. According to the British historian Orlando Figes, at the climax of the civil war Lenin played pragmatically into the Red Army's advantages, in the form of a better organized but smaller army. Optimally disciplined, equipped and supplied, the force exerted less pressure on Rural areas by demanding less requisitions or levies and causing fewer peasant rebellions. They would also put less pressure on factory workers. Furthermore, it would not be made up mainly of peasants but rather workers, more loyal and motivated to fight for the reds.

Deserters in the territories under Bolshevik control: Based on various reports from 1919.
| Territory | Month | Deserters | Captured |
|---|---|---|---|
| Kaluga | July | 10,000 | – |
| Petrograd | – | 65,000 | |
| Ryazan | – | 54,697 | – |
| Saratov | – | 35,000 | – |
| Tambov | – | 60,000 | – |
| Tver | October | 50,000 | 5,430 |
| Yaroslavl | July; September | 9,500 s / i | s / i 1,529 |
| Ivanovo-Voznesensk | – | – | 3,000 |
| Moscow | June; September | – | 1,500; 3,329 |
| Nizhny Novgorod | April | – | 4,900 |
| Oriol | May | – | 5,000 |
| Smolensk (Belsk region) | June | – | 2,600 |
| Vladimir | September | – | 1,529 |

The massive desertion as a phenomenon that affected the entire Red Army indicates that the peasantry were hesitant to serve in it. With many still having rural farms or villages to return to, many deserted during periods of Harvest, with spikes in desertion being indicated by season. During 1918 more than a million soldiers deserted, the following year the figure increased to 2 million, and in 1921 there were almost 4 million. Between 1919 and 1920 3 million men deserted. In 1919, these fugitive "green deserters" numbered more than one million in the territory under Bolshevik control alone, and although trace amounts went on to serve with the Whites, most fought in heavily wooded areas near their own homes against authorities from both sides. Detachments were sent to villages near the battlefront and families suspected of harboring deserters were punished with fines, confiscation of livestock and land, the seizure of hostages, executing community leaders and even burning whole villages to the ground. The special commissions ordered by the Cheka with pursuing them captured 500,000 deserters in 1919 and 600,000 to 800,000 in 1920. Thousands were shot and their families deported, but 1.5 to 2 million avoided capture.

The mass desertions started much earlier. From the Kerensky Offensive to the October Revolution two million soldiers abandoned their positions and returned to their homes. The Tsarist army that was 10,000,000 strong had been defeated by shattered morale in its ranks and the weakness of its institutions, with millions returned to their farms. That same year, 1917, a massive demobilization was decreed. Many of these deserters were peasants, "the Imperial Army was a peasant army", who called themselves Marxists, despite lacking knowledge or understanding of the ideology. Their "trenches Bolshevism reflected above all an aspiration for peace, shared by the combatants of all the countries involved for three years in the most deadly and total wars." More than 2 million of their comrades had perished fighting the Central Powers. Many supported the Bolsheviks in 1917 because they promised an assured peace, but due to the outbreak of the civil war, the peasants were very reluctant to be recruited. During the civil war, the desire for peace in the face of devastation led many communities to declare themselves "neutral republics" to prevent the red or White armies from entering their territories.

It's possible that the Reds never gathered more than half a million "equipped soldiers" at any one time. After capturing Kazan in a five-day struggle, the Bolsheviks stopped retreating and began to reap successes thanks to the cemented centralization of command and a mass wave of recruits. It quickly had to face mass desertions between June 1919 and June 1920. About 2,700,000 men were recruited, with almost all of this figure deserting except 60,000 troops. In August 1920, the Reds had no more than 700,000 combatants, less than 500,000 active, with 2,250,000 as reservists in training, 391,000 in reserve units and 159,000 in labor units, wounded, sick or deserters. The greens were always more numerous than the Whites. In concrete figures, Yudenich commanded 30,000 Whites, Kolchak 120,000 and Denikin around 150,000; by comparison, the Greens numbered over half a million during 1919. According to Western intelligence services, in September of that year the Bolsheviks were holding out with 120,000 soldiers in the Urals (eastern front), 180,000 in the Chernozem region (southern front), 35,000 in Pskov (northern front) and 130,000 in Belarus (western front). In July 1918, there were 40 to 50 thousand "international combatants", made up of Chinese, Romanian, Polish, Czech and Austro-Hungarian leftists, not including the Latvian Rifles.

Official size of the Russian armies: Based on government reports.
| Year | Numbers | Institution |
|---|---|---|
| 1914 | 1,423,000 | Russian Imperial Army |
| 1918 | 106,000 | Red Army |
| 1919 | 435,000 | Red Army |
| 1920 | 3,538,000 | Red Army |
| 1921 | 4,110,000 | Red Army |
| 1922 | 1,590,000 | Red Army |
| 1923 | 703,000 | Red Army |
| 1924–1927 | 562,000 | Red Army |

The Bolshevik forces were militarily fragile, as proven after the Battle of Warsaw, where Lenin's project to expand the revolution to Berlin or Budapest and then further west by military invasion was ultimately fruitless. Westerners wanted to surround Russia with a belt that prevented the further spread of Marxist and Leftist fervor, with a strong independent Poland being key in that plan and acting as one of the causes of the Polish-Soviet war: first encouraging Polish expansionism to the east, after stoking the Russian nationalism that the Bolsheviks knew how to take advantage of, and finally motivating Lenin to try to break this belt and overwhelm the new order founded in Versailles. The red soldiers were unable to defeat the newborn Polish army, ensuring that they would be unable to compete with the established and powerful industrial countries of central and western Europe. The failure to spread the Revolution across Europe would spurn on internal debate within the Bolsheviks, with Bukharin and Stalin later formulating the dominant theory of socialism in one country.

Within this Red Army, the special units of the Cheka and the "internal defense troops of the Republic" stood out, with 200,000 members in 1921. In the wake of the Revolution, they were the main repressive organs of the fledgling Soviet State. Due to the small number of regular soldiers at the disposal of all sides, the armies that were in the Russian battlefields were very small – tens of thousands in the largest battles – compared to those used in the World War I. Volunteers were scarce and undisciplined, forcing Soviet commanders to recruit peasants, a social group that Soviet military leadership considered unreliable. This was coupled with increased pressure towards requisitions, which only contributed to the formation of new peasant guerrillas.

== Leadership ==
Besides Soviet records of their oppositional activity, there is very little personal information about the Green leaders, described as "men who acted and wrote not" due to the widespread illiteracy and spontaneous nature of their movement (85% of the population was illiterate in 1917). To build substantial forces, a motivated individual would lead a group of soldiers through the countryside, enlisting village inhabitants and deserters from the Red Army along the way. The leaders would enter a village and make an announcement, employing simple messages and vague, reactionary goals in their rhetoric to rouse enthusiasm. They often exaggerated Bolshevik weakness and opposition victories as a means to convince listeners to join. By keeping the objectives simple, the recruitment indiscriminate, and the mood optimistic, Green leaders succeeded in provoking a sense among the peasants that they could make a significant dent in Bolshevik power. They also drew support from disillusioned urban and railroad workers, who had "fled back to the villages" and informed the peasants about the horrendous working conditions of developing industry. Among these atamans were Aleksandr Antonov, Nykyfor Hryhoriv, Danylo Terpylo and Nestor Makhno.

== Constituents, leadership and goals ==
Despite Soviet attempts to associate the Green armies with White leadership, such a designation overemphasizes the political aspects of the movement. In a broad sense, the Green armies were spontaneous manifestations of peasant discontent rather than of any specific ideology. By 1920, the Bolsheviks had secured victory over the Whites. The peasant soldiers of the Red Army, outraged at the prospect of continuing to violently oppress their own class in the interest of the new government, deserted and consolidated in groups in the forests, eventually leading to their "Green" designation. While these groups primarily opposed the Bolsheviks, they often did so without a plan or alternative form of government in mind; rather, they simply wanted to rid the countryside of Bolshevik influence by any means necessary.

== Peasant Wars ==
The revolts varied greatly from one another, however, the Soviets tended to classify them into two main categories: bunt, a specific, brief revolt with few participants; and vostante, an insurrection of thousands of peasants, capable of conquering cities and giving themselves a coherent political program, usually of a social-revolutionary type, as in Tambov, or anarchist, like the peasant armies of Makhno.

=== First revolts ===
Among the initial movements would be the Livny rebellion, easily put down during August 1918. Also included is the Izhevsk–Votkinsk Uprising of that year and what is considered the first true vostante, the Chapan rebellion, which broke out on the banks of the Volga, in the districts of Karsun, Syzran, Sengilei and Stavropol in 1919.

It should be mentioned that the Kuban and Don Cossacks and the tribes of Caucasus rose up in 1920, forming their own peasant guerrillas. The latter reached more than 30,000 rebels in arms. They remained very active until the summer of the following year, when they will be definitively defeated, although small green parties in Kuban, Don and Western Siberia remained active until 1923. Later, in 1924, there would be a last revolt in Georgia. It was quickly and harshly repressed.

=== Ukrainian Atamans ===
Danylo Ilkovych Terpylo led a Ukrainian nationalist peasant uprising characterized by antisemitic pogroms. He came to control the countryside of the Kiev province, but not the big cities, and had 20,000 armed followers.

Another green movement was the brief rebellion of Nykyfor Hryhoriv, ataman of Kherson, and Yuriy Tyutyunnyk. Hryhoriv was an opportunistic leader who knew how to switch sides when it suited him.

=== Siberian rebellions ===
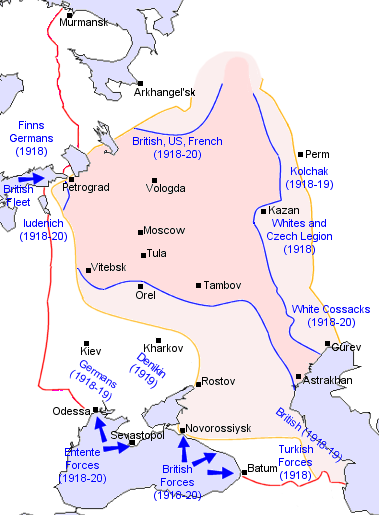
Map of European Russia between 1918 and 1921. In yellow the boundary of the areas controlled by the Bolsheviks in November 1918; in blue the maximum advances of the Whites during 1919; and in red the Soviet borders of 1921.

Admiral Kolchak made the fatal mistake of winning the animosity of peasants eager for agricultural reform by restoring the rights of landowners. The problem worsened in early 1919. Kolchak resorted to terror to appease them. With his rear weakened by the wear and tear of the guerrillas, the White regime could not stop the Bolshevik advance, which on the other hand, knew how to add local partisans to its forces wherever it advanced.

At the beginning of 1920 the Pitchfork uprising broke out, led by the Army of Black Eagles, which spread through the fields of Kazan, Simbirsk and Ufa. However, the rapid Bolshevik reaction brought their annihilation the following month.

Between the beginning of 1921 and the end of 1922, the West Siberian rebellion took place, the largest green uprising, and perhaps the least studied, both in number of rebels and in size geographic.

=== Makhnovist Revolution ===
One of the best known and most organized of these movements was the Makhnovist Revolution led by the Ukrainian anarchists Nestor Makhno, Fedir Shchus and Semen Karetnyk. Its movement was only comparable to that of Tambov due to its magnitude and organization. In a few years the Makhnovist partisans fought against Germans and Austro-Hungarians, Petliura nationalists, a French-led intervention in Berdyansk, and were targets of Denikin, Wrangel and Bolsheviks.

=== Tambov Rebellion ===
Probably the best known green movement is the rebellion that broke out on August 19, 1920, in the small town of Khitrovo, as a rejection of food requisitions in the Tambov Oblast and quickly spread to Penza, Saratov and Voronezh. This was defeated in June 1922 with the death of its leader, Aleksandr Antonov.

== Tactics ==
While it can be difficult to distinguish Green armies from other forms of peasant unrest, they were marked by concentrated leadership and distinct units, displaying a higher level of organization than most peasant uprisings. For instance, Aleksandr Antonov's Green army in Tambov had a medical staff, reinforcement brigades, and a complex system of communication and intelligence that employed women, children, and the elderly. Notable Green movements also developed in the regions of Novgorod, Tula, Ryazan, Tver, Voronezh, Kostroma, Syzran, Gomel, Kursk, Bryansk and Oryol, among many others. Estimations of Green forces ranged from a few hundred to 50,000 fighters. Apart from the weapons that Red deserters brought with them, the Greens stole war material from defeated Bolshevik soldiers, from Bolshevik supply buildings, and from abandoned garrisons of the former Imperial Russian Army. They incited armed resistance to Bolshevik institutions in nearby villages and towns, bragging of peasant victories and recruiting new soldiers, sometimes by force. They formed guerrilla bands, which conducted highly mobile guerrilla warfare, attacking Bolshevik communication systems, mills, railways and factories. They also organized detachments numerically comparable to the Reds, in West Siberia they were even capable of facing them in the open field. The peasants were permanently in need of modern rifles and machine guns, decisive for the war, being forced to obtain them anyway. Crowds stormed the cities, looting and burning the Party offices, the local Soviet, police posts, courts, and propaganda centers. The collective farms were destroyed. Tools, livestock, requisitioned grain, mills, factories, breweries, and bakeries were redistributed. This claim of popular property served the Greens to gain the support of the population. If the peasants successfully overwhelmed Bolsheviks, they cruelly punished soldiers and officials, often mutilating bodies, torturing families or burying victims alive.

No more than 6,000 men, evenly distributed, fought in the first battles between the Whites of Lavr Kornilov and the Reds of Rudolf Sivers. Because of the small number of men involved and the tiny territory affected, it is difficult to call this even a civil war. During the entire first year of the war there were only skirmishes and artillery duels with small armies or partisan forces, more concerned with obtaining supplies. Territory continually changed hands, there were no front lines or fixed positions. In the decisive battles of 1919, they mobilized the peasantry by force, to fight in large armies with hundreds of thousands of men facing each other on fronts of hundreds of kilometers and supported with heavy weapons.

Their favored activities included blowing up bridges, cutting telegraph lines and raising railways in an attempt to paralyze communications and movements of the Reds. They preferred to prowl during the day, keeping watch over their enemies and attacking at night. They permanently refused to fight in the open, hiding in hills and forests to ambush and retreat quickly. Their greater mobility made up for their total absence of artillery. In Western Siberia and Central Russia, their guerilla tactics were aided by the wooded terrain of the taiga. When they were defeated they mixed with the civil population or fled on horses provided by the locals.

The Greens often used red flags

The Greens formed multitudes of peasants with clogs made of linden bark, they armed themselves with what they found: sticks, pitchforks, tridents, pikes, hoes, axes and clubs. To a lesser extent, also firearms such as shotguns, carbines, hunting rifles, pistols and rifles. Also many greens fought under red flags, symbols of the revolution later appropriated by the Communists.

The first small units sent by the Bolsheviks to subdue them were easily defeated and practically did nothing more than give them more weapons. Many Bolshevik units, especially in 1918, lacked training and discipline, dispersing after the first shots. For every Red soldier in combat, another eight were inactive due to illness or lack of training, clothing or ammunition. Whites were more disciplined and numerous and better trained. When the Bolsheviks were forced to withdraw from a region by guerrilla harassment they tended to take hostages in towns and cities and execute them once they were safe in territory under their rule. On the other hand, the Reds did not hesitate to suppress them with machine guns, tanks, armored cars, armored trains, heavy cannons, observation airplanes and poison gases leftovers from the arsenals of the Great War. In addition to flooding rebel areas with troops and propaganda. Quickly, the Communists learned that: "Conventional armies, however well armed, are ill-equipped to fight against a well supported peasant army." A lesson they would learn again much later in Afghanistan.

== Bolshevik response ==
The Bolshevik government tried to build an anti-revolutionary, anti-communist image for the Green armies. Provincial Communist officials announced to locals that the Green armies were a subsection of the villainous White movement, despite the fact that Green armies were generally just as hostile to the Whites as they were to the Reds. The Bolsheviks also exaggerated the influence of the kulaks in Green armies, who were undoubtedly involved, but hardly the driving force of the movement.

These massive uprisings, which shook Soviet power in Eastern Ukraine, Tambov, and Siberia in 1919–1921, involved more than 100,000 guerrillas and millions of peasant supporters. In the words of Vladimir Lenin, it was a "great internal political crisis", the first in Soviet history. These rebellions were recognized by Lenin as "far more dangerous than all the forces of Denikin, Yudenich and Kolchak combined," as he proclaimed on March 8, 1921, in his opening speech at the 10th Party Congress.

The civil war in Russia has generally been analyzed as a conflict between the Reds (Bolsheviks) and the Whites (Royalists). In reality, beyond the military confrontations between the Red Army and the various units that made up a fairly heteroclite white army, the most important thing was what happened in the rear of the most important front lines.

The Bolsheviks initially believed that they could easily defeat the Greens, treating them as a hopeless cause both in their propaganda and in their military strategies. Instead of focusing armed attention on the Greens as a whole, the Reds treated each peasant army as a specific instance of unrest, suppressing harshly and further angering the peasant population. By the time that Vladimir Lenin and the Bolsheviks realized the strength of the Green movement, it had grown into a serious social and military threat to Bolshevik power. The small units sent to subdue them many times defected demoralized, so they were replaced by a combination of mass terror, propaganda and flooding rebel areas with troops. Some scholars credit the Green movement with indirectly forcing the Communist Party to change its economic strategy in 1921 (see New Economic Policy), and yet, while the Greens certainly contributed to changes in Bolshevik policy, the extent of their influence is open to debate. It is far less contestable that the New Economic Policy – along with increased rainfall – quelled the Green movement by improving rural conditions and thus damaged the Green armies’ foundation for successful recruitment – peasant discontent. By the summer of 1922, as the Bolsheviks were securing their victory in the civil war, the Green troops had all but disappeared. The demise of these movements was in large part caused by the famine of 1921–1922, which affected 29 million people in total and killed about five million, being the main weapon of the regime to regain control over many provinces. Ruthless terror played its part in suppressing the revolts, but the main weapon was hunger.

In the opinion of the anarchists: "The basic psychological trait of Bolshevism is the realization of its will by means of the violent elimination of all other wills, the absolute destruction of all individuality, to the point where it becomes an inanimate object." Many local Communist officials saw that the requisition orders starved their own people to death, but "The good comrade did the what was said to him; he was pleased to leave all critical thinking to the Central Committee." That was the discipline the Party advocated. Ironically, many Bolshevik officers were the children of peasants educated in Tsarist military schools. With their minds open when leaving the narrow rural world, they rejected the mentality of their parents and grandparents and did not hesitate to repress their own people.

The resistance of the Cossacks led to a fierce campaign of decossackization, from 1919 to 1920, in which they were repressed with the clear intention of eliminating them "as a social group" -the first of many repressions in Soviet history. Men were shot, women and children deported, their homes burned and their lands repopulated with non-Cossack settlers. During the Lenin and Stalin governments, to economically develop territories and punish potentially separatist peoples, numerous communities were starved, deported and replaced by Russian settlers. Hence, the resistance and genocide of the Cossacks were called by the Bolshevik leaders themselves as the "Soviet Vendée." Lenin admitted to imitating the tactics devised by François Babeuf, inventor of modern communism, who planned the "populicide" of Vendée, which found its climax in the "infernal columns".

The Red Terror was much more systematic, widespread and effective than the White Terror. Any opposition, real or potential, was mercilessly repressed, setting the tone for future civil wars of the 20th century. The prison population of the Chekas were "a reduced version of society itself", they included all kinds of people and there was no family that had not suffered the arrest or disappearance of a member. Terror against the workers had begun in 1918 and reached its climax in 1921, with the subjugation of Kronstadt. According to several of the Bolshevik leaders, the terror started by Lenin was the natural consequence of the violent seizure of power and his rejection of democracy. The only allies of the Bolsheviks were the left SRs, although only at the beginning because later they were also repressed following the Left SR Uprising. According to the anarchists, both sought to subjugate the people through the state.

Lenin also ordered the Bolshevik Party itself to be purged to get rid of potentially unfair or useless elements. In parallel there was an exorbitant growth of the Party, distancing the bases from its leaders. The first purge took place in the summer of 1918, the second in the spring of 1919, and the third in the summer of 1920, focusing on comrades of peasant or non-Russian origin. The Party did not inspire loyalty and people voluntarily left it in waves.

== Reasons for failure ==
Aside from the Bolshevik response, a number of internal aspects of the Green movement led to its failure. Green activity often amounted to violence without an actual goal beyond killing communists and interrupting their economic and political activity. Thus, the armies rarely moved outside of their original geographic region. When Greens conquered towns or villages, they did not install themselves politically, leaving the territory to be retaken later by Bolsheviks. At the same time, many peasant militias were loosely organized and lacked greater military or political coordination among them, which made it difficult to take advantage of the widespread discontent, preventing "most or all of peasant Russia bustling with rebellion" to overthrow the new regime. Furthermore, there was a great deal of tension within the bands, which often included agrarian peasants, kulaks, workers and Whites, many with preexisting resentment towards each other. The Green armies were underfunded, low on supplies, and outmatched by the Red Army (which, despite its flaws, had better organization and morale as a result of greater, more frequent victories).

The civil war caused more than ten million deaths from fighting, terror, plagues and mainly famine, which took about half, and another couple of million emigrated, affecting mainly adult men. Another ten million people were not born as a result of the fall in the birth rate according to demographic estimates. According to the American demographer Frank Lorimer, between 1914 and 1926, some two million military personnel and fourteen million civilians died, of which nine to ten million were direct or indirect victims of the revolution. His Soviet counterpart, Boris Tsezarévich Urlanis, spoke of eight million. More Red soldiers died from smallpox, cholera, typhoid and venereal diseases than in combat. According to Urlanis, 300,000 Reds, Whites and Poles died in combat, but more than 450,000 from disease. According to the historian Evan Mawdsley epidemics decimated the Russian population. In 1917, 63,000 deaths from typhus and typhoid fever were counted, in 1919 there were 890,000 and in 1920 another 1,044,000. To this is added the quota in lives that dysentery, cholera and Spanish flu took in 1918–1919, so the figure probably exceeded three million based on data on extremely high infant mortality. About seven million orphans were left roaming the streets, living off handouts, robberies and prostitution. Many were later recruited into the army to become the soldiers and repressors of Stalinism. Ironically, this is how they received education, clothing and food, and established child-parent relationships with their officers.

=== New Economic Policy ===
Short of food and fuel, Petrograd was abandoned by most of its population. Of its 2 million inhabitants in 1918, barely 500,000 remained in 1920. Millions returned to the countryside to get food, crowding the railway stations. The fuel shortage, the economic crisis and the impossibility of repairing the cars caused these transports to collapse. The first to do so were those peasants who had arrived to the cities a few years ago or those who still had close ties with their native villages. For their part, the villagers received migrants with kinship ties or who knew some trade (carpenters or blacksmiths), but not the rest. Many were workers whose factories had closed, others only migrated to exchange manufactured objects for food and return to the cities, they went in armed brigades on stolen trains, becoming uncontrollable for the Bolshevik authorities. In addition, many railway officials were very corrupt; trains leaving the farms laden with food were looted by hungry crowds until they were emptied before reaching the cities. This only contributed to throwing transport into chaos and paralyzing industry, with the majority of workers spending most of their time making their own products and then going to exchange them for food on long trips.

Thus, in 1920 most of rural Russia was in the power of rebellious peasant smallholders, while the Bolshevik authorities only controlled the cities with volost. The following year, the Communists locked up in the cities saw communications interrupted and industry was paralyzed because the workers went on strike due to the null supply of grain to the cities. Since they had no food to encourage them to work, the Bolsheviks responded by depriving them of the few rations they received, imprisoning them or even shooting them if they did not meet production quotas. Large worker protests broke out in Petrograd, Moscow and other cities, in "a last desperate attempt to bring it down", sparking the Kronstadt rebellion. Its subsequent submission led to the fierce repression of the SRs and Mensheviks, parties closely linked to the organization of the protests.

In the end, this was the cause of the abandonment of war communism and the adoption of the New Economic Policy (NEP): "Having defeated the Whites, who were backed by no less than eight Western powers, the Bolsheviks surrendered to the peasantry." War communism had brought massive desertions and the blocking of supplies by the peasantry, and it was clear that "the national question was also ipso facto the peasant question", after all, 85% of Russians lived in rural areas. This change was nothing more than a "temporary deviation" in everyone's mind, possibly more than a decade in Lenin's mind, and for the sole purpose of rebuilding Russia. The market would always be regulated and would be gradually socialized by the State.

The Bolsheviks searched for a way to end popular support for the Greens. Salt and manufactured goods were offered to villages that passed a resolution declaring the rebels "bandits," knowing that the latter would attack them in retaliation. The guerrillas themselves helped them in their work. Many criminals joined them and dedicated themselves to looting and raping, earning the hatred of the people.

At the end of the war, the large urban populations were disintegrated and the industry had almost disappeared, only the small rural owners remained. In 1921, with the civil war decided, the Soviet republics numbered 75 million ethnic Russians and 65 million other peoples, including 30 million speakers of Turkish or Iranian languages. Of these, 112 million were peasants, that is, it was a predominantly rural country.

=== Famine ===
The year 1921 in the Russian countryside was characterized by droughts, extreme frosts, and strong spring winds that ripped off the topsoil and ruined fledgling crops. To make matters worse, plagues of locusts and mice followed and the harvest of the previous season had been terrible, so much so that they knew that if they delivered everything the prodotriady demanded they knew that they would starve, being forced to rebel. However, war communism had its part in the disaster. Faced with requisitions, the peasants preferred to cultivate less land, just enough to survive. Faced with the almost non-existence of surpluses, the Bolsheviks began to take away their vital reserves, arguing that they had more hidden. They were accustomed to poor harvests and they overcame them by keeping communal reserves, but to avoid requisitions they reduced their production to mere survival, leaving them extremely vulnerable to bad weather conditions. Thus, the regions most affected by the famine of 1921–1922 had suffered the most from the requisitions of 1918–1921. The regions most disputed in the war, with constant changes of the front, were even more ruined.

Hunger made them eat grass, weeds, leaves, moss, tree bark, roof coverings, and flour made from acorns, sawdust, mud, and horse dung. They devoured their livestock, and hunted dogs, cats, and rodents. Many fell into cannibalism, eating the meat of people who had already died. Many even ate their dead children and relatives. As famine slowly exterminated the inhabitants of the Volga, Kama and Don river basins, of the Urals, Bashkortostan, Kazakhstan, Western Siberia and southern Ukraine, Bolshevik authorities ordered the thousands who tried to save themselves by fleeing to the cities be forced to return to the fields, claiming that they carried contagious diseases with them. They also ordered the export of a large quantity of grain from Ukraine to the Volga, feeding one affected region and further damaging another. The intention was to punish the Ukrainian peasantry for their resistance to the new regime, as Stalin did again in the 1930s.

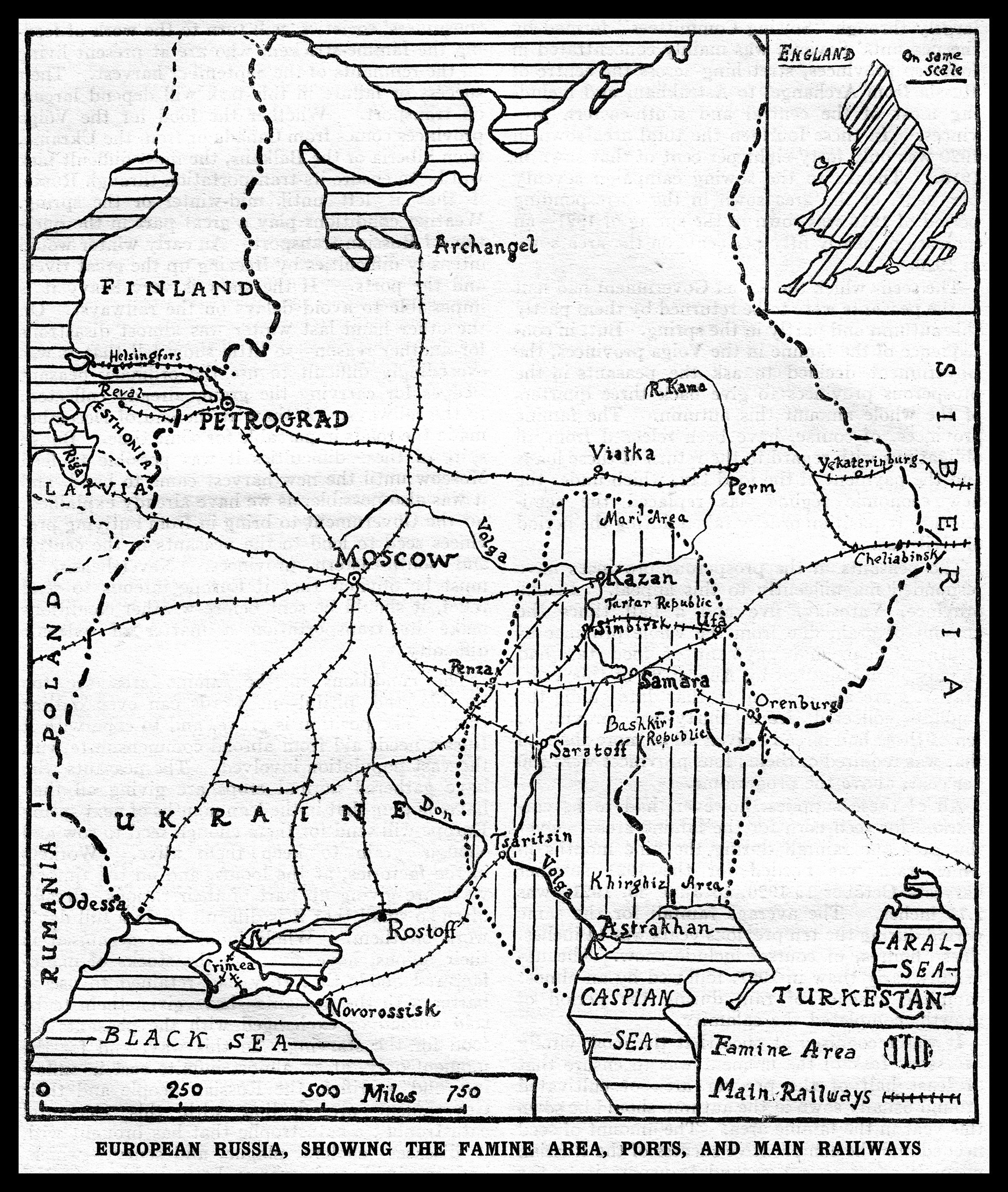
Map of the area affected by the Russian famine of 1921–22.

Out of shame, the Bolshevik government did not recognize the famine until July 1921. At the request of Maxim Gorky, one of the most respected Russian writers of his time, Herbert Hoover organized international aid through the American Relief Administration (ARA). Gorky organized the Pomgol (Помгол), short for Помощь голодающим, "Famine Relief." The conditions of the ARA were the release of all American citizens in Bolshevik prisons and the non-interference of the Communist authorities in the delivery of aid. Moscow accepted. Once international aid was secured, Lenin ordered the arrest of all Pomgol members on August 27, with the exception of prominent members like Gorky, on charges of being counterrevolutionary. Many were exiled or banished to restricted access areas in the interior of Russia.

In the summer of 1922 the ARA fed eleven million people a day and brought medicines, clothes, tools and seeds that were essential to achieve two large harvests of 1922 and 1923, bringing Russia out of the famine. In contrast, the corrupt and inefficient central commission created by Lenin helped less than three million. The gratitude of the Bolshevik government was translated into accusations to the ARA of attempting to discredit, spy on and shoot them down, interfering in their operations, searching their convoys, stopping their trains, stealing supplies and arresting members of assistance teams. However, the US aid was not canceled until it was made public that in full famine the Communist government continued to export millions of tons of its own cereals abroad, excusing itself from buying industrial and agricultural equipment. The ARA ended its operations in June 1923. The Bolsheviks alone wrote a short formal note of thanks, Gorki was much more grateful in a long letter to Hoover.

Despite the efforts, some five million people died. The famine marked the end of the revolution.

=== Collectivization and restart of conflict ===
Unable to rule the countryside peacefully or to produce manufactured goods to trade with, the Bolsheviks resorted to terrorizing it and forcibly taking the fruits of their labor. This started a "hidden civil war" between the peasantry and the nascent Bolshevik state, characterized by thousands of large and small revolts and riots. After the conflict ended, there was a tense truce between the peasantry and the state, but the state later returned with collectivization.

On March 10, 1923, Lenin suffered his third stroke. From then on, and especially after his death on the following January 24, the struggle to succeed him as unquestionable leader of the USSR intensified. This briefly prevented the regime from focusing on repressing and exploiting the peasantry. Thus, the peasants were able to redistribute their lands, be free to consume and trade with the fruit of their labor. They rebuilt the commercial networks that had been broken since 1914, and self-governed themselves according to the traditions of each village. The presence of the state was reduced to a minimum. However, this calm only masked the tension between the repressive state and the broader society. In those years, state terrorism tended to be concentrated in the peripheral areas of the USSR, such as the Caucasus and Central Asia, recently subdued areas of non-Russian culture and with a long tradition of resistance to Moscow.

The first Soviet ethnographers who visited the villages around Moscow felt that they were going to the Amazon. There were people who "lived as if they were trapped in the Middle Ages." A society of archaic and patriarchal life, where witchcraft was believed, time was divided by seasons and religious festivals instead of months, with pagan rituals and superstitions, beatings of wives, tumultuous law, fistfights and days of drunkenness. Since before the revolution the urban elites saw the countryside as a "particularly obscurantist" environment where magic, religious rites and customs gave terror and comfort to people. Half a million soldiers joined the Communist Party after the war, bringing party ideology to their villages during the 1920s. The Bolsheviks and the NEP modernized village life with power lines, hospitals, theaters, cinemas and libraries. They also brought chemical fertilizers, cross-seed and modern tools. Dairy production and exclusive crops for the market became generalized, which before the revolution were exclusive activities of the nobility. There was an increased exchange of products, tools and livestock with cities, in addition to credit. Cooperatives among peasants also grew: "with its smallholder instincts, superstitions and attachment to tradition, it would be abolished by these socialist farms." A literate youth was born among the peasantry that was much more ambitious than their parents, defiant before the authority of the elderly and religion, they were more individualistic. The Party based its influence in the countryside on them. Many young people sought in it the way to escape from the boring life in the countryside and helped organize Stalinist collectivization, all to break with the old ways of life. The villages were not divided between rich and poor, as the Bolsheviks believed, but between old and young.

At the end of the decade the Bolsheviks tried to centralize power. They resorted to reducing the number of rural Soviets, but this left many villages without any authority in 1929, making it impossible to collect taxes or enforce laws. The small rural owners had been decisively strengthened by the revolution and as a consequence of the civil war, most of the villages were ruled by their own community. The state only reached the cities with volost. Stalin realized that the longer the NPE lasted, the greater the distance grew between the regime's plans and its impotence before the peasantry, until they could do nothing against the "kulak," that is, small and medium-sized owners. It was better to go ahead and restart the civil war with an advantage. Only in 1927, after banishing, displacing or eliminating his main opponents and remaining safe as boss, did Stalin put an end to the "peasant utopia" based on the "eserovschina" or "revolutionary socialist mentality". That year, greater state intervention on agricultural production began with a strong political repression, despite the fear of some leaders of a new war. This brought down production, causing a "harvest crisis", which served as a pretext for Stalin to initiate collectivization.

There was no resistance from the peasantry until the confrontations against Stalinist collectivization, the expropriation of cattle and church closings. This hit particularly hard in 1930, with two and a half million villagers taking part in 14,000 revolts, riots and mass demonstrations that year. These mainly affect Chernozem, the North Caucasus and Western Ukraine (especially border areas with Poland and Romania), regions that came to be outside government control. About five million fled from the Kolkhoz in the aforementioned regions and Kazakhstan. But this new movement could not federate or organize like the previous one, they had no capable leaders or political cadres (decimated during the civil war), had to fight with pitchforks and axes (firearms were progressively requisitioned during the 1920s) and the regime reacted too quickly.

== See also ==
- Atamanshchina
- Basmachi movement
- Black Guards
- Kronstadt rebellion
- Left SR uprising
- List of peasant revolts
- Osip Tsebriy
- Revolutionary Insurgent Army of Ukraine

== Bibliography ==
- Arshinov, Peter (1974). History of the Makhnovist Movement (1918–1921). Translated by Perlman, Lorraine; Perlman, Fredy. Detroit: Black & Red. OCLC 865420.
- Avrich, Paul (2014). Kronstadt, 1921. Princeton: Princeton University Press. ISBN 978-1-4008-5908-5. OCLC 881139590.
- Bolinaga Irasuegui, Iñigo (2010). Breve historia de la Revolución rusa (in Spanish). Madrid: Ediciones Nowtilus. ISBN 978-84-9763-843-2.
- Bookchin, Murray (2004). The Third Revolution: Popular Movements in the Revolutionary Era. Vol. III. London: Cassell. ISBN 978-0-8264-5054-8. OCLC 314482897.
- Bouchard, E. A. (2003). ИЗ ИСТОРИИ ТЮМЕНСКОГО ПРИКАЗА О ССЫЛЬНЫХ (1869—1904) (in Russian). Regional Museum of Tyumen. pp. 38–40.
- Brovkin, Vladimir N. (2015) [1994]. Behind the Front Lines of the Civil War: Political Parties and Social Movements in Russia, 1918–1922. Princeton: Princeton University Press. ISBN 978-0-691-03278-8. OCLC 922803678.
- Boyd, Douglas (2014). The Other First World War: The Blood-Soaked Russian Fronts 1914-1922. Stroud: The History Press. ISBN 978-0-7509-5786-1. OCLC 890574400.
- Bullock, David (2012a). The Russian Civil War, 1918-22. London: Osprey Publishing. ISBN 978-1-78200-536-0. OCLC 956970142.
- Bullock, David (2012b). The Czech Legion 1914-20. Oxford: Osprey Publishing. ISBN 978-1-78096-458-4. OCLC 843342846.
- Cannistraro, Phillip V.; Reich, John J. (2004). The Western Perspective: 1789 - Present. Vol. III. Belmont: Wadsworth. ISBN 9780534610654. OCLC 249461209.
- Conquest, Robert (1987). The Harvest of Sorrow: Soviet Collectivization and the Terror-famine. New York: Oxford University Press. ISBN 978-0-19-505180-3. OCLC 1023952466.
- Dowling, Timothy C. (2015). Russia at War: From the Mongol Conquest to Afghanistan, Chechnya, and Beyond. Santa Barbara: ABC-CLIO. ISBN 978-1-59884-948-6. OCLC 880349770.
- Efimov, L.A. (2009). Аликовская энциклопедия (in Russian). Cheboksary: Чувашское книжное изд-во. ISBN 978-5-7670-1630-3. OCLC 458586904.
- Figes, Orlando (1991). Peasant Russia, Civil War: The Volga Countryside in Revolution. New York: Oxford University Press. ISBN 978-0-19-822898-1. OCLC 1051396156.
- Figes, Orlando (1996). La Revolución rusa (1891-1924). La tragedia de un pueblo [A People's Tragedy: The Russian Revolution: 1891–1924] (in Spanish). Translated by Vidal, César. Barcelona: Edhasa. ISBN 978-84-350-2691-8.
- Forsyth, James (1994). A History of the Peoples of Siberia: Russia's North Asian Colony 1581–1990. Cambridge: Cambridge University Press. ISBN 978-0-521-47771-0. OCLC 1139000292.
- Gill, Graeme J. (1979). Peasants and Government in the Russian Revolution. London: Macmillan. ISBN 9780333256725. OCLC 920925869.
- Hosking, Geoffrey A. (1992). The First Socialist Society: A History of the Soviet Union from Within. Cambridge: Harvard University Press. ISBN 978-0-674-30443-7. OCLC 1071014586.
- Khvostov, Mikhail (1997). The Russian Civil War (2): White Armies. London: Osprey Publishing. ISBN 978-1-85532-656-9. OCLC 645396520.
- Kenez, Peter (1971). Civil War in South Russia, 1918: The First Year of the Volunteer Army. Berkeley: University of California Press. ISBN 978-0-520-01709-2. OCLC 768422892.
- Klimin, Ivan Ivanovič (2004). Российское крестьянство в годы Гражданской войны: 1917-1921 (in Russian). СПб. OCLC 646290950.
- Kotkin, Stephen (2014). Stalin: Paradoxes of Power, 1878–1928. New York: Penguin. ISBN 9780698170100. OCLC 893620984.
- Landis, Erik C. (2008). Bandits and Partisans: The Antonov Movement in the Russian Civil War. Pittsburgh: University of Pittsburgh Press. ISBN 9780822971177. OCLC 721292297.
- Lehning, Arthur (2004). Marxismo y anarquismo en la Revolución Rusa (in Spanish). Buenos Aires: Utopía libertaria. ISBN 987-20875-2-0. OCLC 992068799.
- Lenin, Vladimir (1905). "Two Tactics of Social-Democracy in the Democratic Revolution". Collected Works. Vol. 9. Translated by Fineburg, Abraham; Katzer, Julius. Moscow. pp. 15–140.
- Lenin, Vladimir (1906). Revision of the Agrarian Programme of the Workers' Party. Collected Works. Vol. 10. Moscow. pp. 165–195.
- Lenin, Vladimir (1915). Socialism and War. Collected Works. Vol. 21. Moscow. pp. 295–338.
- Makhno, Nestor (1927). Alexandre Skirda (ed.). "The Makhovshchina and Anti-Semitism". The struggle against the state and other essays. Translated by Sharkey, Paul. Edinburgh: AK Press. pp. 15–18.
- Mayer, Arno J. (2013). The Furies: Violence and Terror in the French and Russian Revolutions. Princeton: Princeton University Press. ISBN 9780691090153. OCLC 956877555.
- Mawdsley, Evan (2007). The Russian Civil War. New York: Pegasus Books. ISBN 9781933648156. OCLC 1143484710.
- Naumov, Igor V. (2006). David Collins (ed.). The History of Siberia. London: Routledge. ISBN 978-1-134-20703-9. OCLC 77732892.
- Nenarokov, Albert Pávlovich (1968). Russia in the twentieth century: the view of a Soviet historian. New York: W. Morrow. OCLC 318253260.
- Payne, Stanley G (2011). Civil War in Europe, 1905–1949. Cambridge: Cambridge University Press. ISBN 9781107648159. OCLC 812590884.
- Phillips, Steve (2000). Lenin and the Russian Revolution. Oxford: Heinemann. ISBN 978-0-435-32719-4. OCLC 1023264761.
- Poliakov, Yuri Aleksandrovich (1987). The Socialist Revolution and Its Defense: Early History of Soviet Russia. Translated by Garb, Paula. Moscow: Progress Publishers. OCLC 988294564.
- Powell, Jim (2007). Wilson's War: How Woodrow Wilson's Great Blunder Led to Hitler, Lenin, Stalin, and World War II. New York: Crown Publishing Group. ISBN 9780307422712. OCLC 607606074.
- Radkey, Oliver H. (1976). The Unknown Civil War in Soviet Russia: A Study of the Green Movement in the Tambov Region 1920-1921. Stanford: Hoover Institution. OCLC 873981358.
- Raleigh, Donald J. (2002). Experiencing Russia's Civil War: Politics, Society, and Revolutionary Culture in Saratov, 1917–1922. Princeton: Princeton University. ISBN 978-0-691-11320-3. OCLC 649645820.
- Reese, Roger R. (2000). The Soviet Military Experience: A History of the Soviet Army, 1917-1991. London: Routledge. ISBN 9780415217194. OCLC 1170338144.
- Rempel, David G. (2011). Cornelia Rempel Carlson (ed.). A Mennonite Family in Tsarist Russia and the Soviet Union, 1789-1923. Toronto: University of Toronto Press. ISBN 9781442613188. OCLC 821828775.
- Roberts, Paul Craig; LaFollette, Katharine (1990). Meltdown: Inside the Soviet Economy. Washington DC: Cato Institute. ISBN 978-1-937184-18-6. OCLC 782878336.
- Rojas, Mauricio (March 14, 2012). "Trotsky, Stalin y Lenin: el Bueno, el Malo y el Feo" (in Spanish). Madrid: Libertad Digital.
- Safonov, Dmitri A. (1998). Сафонов Д.А. Великая крестьянская война 1920–1921 гг. и Южный Урал. Gran Guerra Campesina de 1920–1921 y los Urales del Sur (in Russian). Orenburgo: Моя Библиотека.
- Shishkin, Vladímir Ivanovich (2001). Западно-Сибирский мятеж 1921 года: историография вопроса. Межвузовский сборник научных трудов (in Russian). Vol. II. Novosibirsk: Universidad Estatal de Novosibirsk. pp. 137–175.
- Shulpyakov, Vladímir Aleksándrovich (2004). Гибель Сибирского казачьего войска. 1920–1922. Книга Ii (Россия забытая и неизвестная) (in Russian). Центрполиграф. ISBN 5-9524-0847-8.
- Smele, Jonathan D. (2015). Historical Dictionary of the Russian Civil Wars, 1916-1926. Lanham: Rowman & Littlefield. ISBN 9781442252813. OCLC 937370934.
- Sondhaus, Lawrence (2006). Strategic Culture and Ways of War. London: Routledge. ISBN 978-1-135-98975-0. OCLC 1100455283.
- Statiev, Alexander (2010). The Soviet Counterinsurgency in the Western Borderlands. Cambridge: Cambridge University Press. ISBN 978-0-521-76833-7. OCLC 650495208.
- Tirado Hamasaki, Etsuo (2003). "El derecho a la rebelión" (in Spanish). No. 74. Revista ARBIL.
- Vidal, César (2005). Paracuellos-Katyn. Un ensayo sobre el genocidio de la izquierda (in Spanish). Madrid: Libros Libres. ISBN 978-84-96088-32-0. OCLC 642457957.
- Wade, Rex A. (2016). "The Revolution at One Hundred: Issues and Trends in the English Language Historiography of the Russian Revolution of 1917". Journal of Modern Russian History and Historiography. 9 (1): 9–38. doi:10.1163/22102388-00900003. ISSN 1947-9956. OCLC 6854383562.
- Werth, Nicolas (1999). "1. A State against its People: violence, repression, and terror in the Soviet Union". In Stéphane Courtois (ed.). The Black Book of Communism. Cambridge: Harvard University Press. ISBN 978-0-674-07608-2. OCLC 949773841.
- Yergin, Daniel (1993). Russia 2010 and what it Means for the World. New York: Random House. ISBN 9780679429951. OCLC 739020638.
