= Brama (film) =

2017 Ukrainian horror film

- Theatrical release poster for the movie
- Брама
- Directed by: Volodymyr Tykhyi
- Written by: Pavlo Arie (play), Volodymyr Tykhyi
- Based on: At the Beginning and End of Times
- Produced by: Ihor Savichenko, Marko Suprun, Volodymyr Tykhyy, Volodymyr Filippov, Oleksii Moskalenko
- Starring: Irma Vitovska, Vitalina Bibliv, Yaroslav Fedorchuk, Dmytro Iaroshenko
- Cinematography: Vyacheslav Tsvetkov
- Edited by: Ihor Kosenko
- Music by: Anton Baibakov
- Production company: Directory Films
- Distributed by: MMD (Ukraine)
- Release date: 28 November 2017
- Running time: 107 minutes
- Country: Ukraine
- Language: Ukrainian
- Budget: ₴17.8 million

Brama (also known as: The Gate, The Gateway; Ukrainian: «Брама», pronounced [ˈbrɑmɑ]) is a 2017 Ukrainian horror film directed by Volodymyr Tykhyi based on the play At the Beginning and End of Times by Pavlo Arie. The film's world premiere occurred at the Tallinn Black Nights Film Festival on November 28, 2017 and was released for theatrical distribution in Ukraine on July 26, 2018. It was later distributed internationally at various film festivals and screenings.

The film tells the story of a family living in the Chernobyl Exclusion Zone. The household is led by Baba Prisya, who claims to be acquainted with rusalkas. She lives with her grandson Vovchyk and her ailing daughter Slava, who was abandoned by her husband.

Their quiet life is suddenly disrupted when Baba Prisya receives a mystical warning about an impending personal catastrophe that must be prevented.

== Plot ==
The film follows the lives of a small family living in the Chernobyl Exclusion Zone, a desolate and radioactive area abandoned after the 1986 nuclear disaster. The family is led by Baba Prisya, an elderly woman who believes in the supernatural and claims to communicate with rusalkas (water spirits from Slavic folklore). She lives with her daughter Slava, who is in poor health and has been abandoned by her husband, and her grandson Vovchyk, a young man who is shy and fearful of the outside world.

Their secluded life is suddenly disrupted one day when Baba Prisya experiences a mystical vision. She is warned by an unknown entity about an impending personal catastrophe that will soon affect her and her family. Believing the warning to be true, Baba Prisya takes it as her mission to prevent the disaster, but her family is skeptical of her visions and beliefs.

One day, Vovchyk ventures out into the surrounding wilderness to gather objects from the Exclusion Zone, against his grandmother’s warnings. During this trip, he encounters Vasya, a local policeman, who brings food and supplies to the family. Vasya, who believes the area is dangerous due to the radiation and the presence of bandits, advises the family to leave the zone. Baba Prisy refuses to leave, however, convinced that the radiation is a myth and that the real threat is something much more sinister.

As Baba Prisya’s visions intensify, she becomes more obsessed with preventing the foretold catastrophe. She becomes increasingly erratic, convinced that the disaster is tied to extraterrestrial forces that have infiltrated the government. According to her beliefs, the Chernobyl disaster was orchestrated to drive people out of the area and pave the way for a base to communicate with these otherworldly beings. She insists that the government’s evacuation was a cover-up and that the radiation is a distraction from the true danger.

The family’s tensions rise as Baba Prisya takes more drastic steps to prevent the catastrophe, including performing strange rituals and consuming a rare mushroom she believes will open a "gateway" to reveal hidden truths. This leads to surreal, nightmarish sequences, where reality and Baba Prisya’s delusions begin to blur. At one point, the family experiences vivid hallucinations, further complicating their understanding of what is real.

As the family struggles to understand the meaning of Baba Prisya’s warnings, it becomes clear that her connection to the supernatural may have been stronger than they had thought. In the final act, the mystical warning comes to fruition when an unforeseen disaster strikes the family, leading to tragic consequences.

The film ends on an ambiguous note, leaving viewers to question whether Baba Prisya’s beliefs were valid, or if the events were merely the product of her deteriorating mental state.

== Cast ==
- Irma Vitovska as Baba Prisa
- Vitalina Bibliv as Slava, Baba Prisa's daughter
- Yaroslav Fedorchuk as Vovchyk, Slava's son
- Dmytro Iaroshenko as Vasya the Cop
- Dmytro Tuboltsev as Slava's Husband Petya/"Dad"

== Production ==
=== Budget ===
The film had a total production budget of approximately ₴17.8 million (Ukrainian hryvnia), with ₴8.9 million provided by the Ukrainian State Film Agency (Derzhkino), covering about 50% of the total cost.

=== Location ===
Filming took place in the village of Luchanky, located in the Ovruch district of the Zhytomyr region, within the Chernobyl Exclusion Zone.

== Reception ==
=== Critical Reviews ===
Critical reviews of The Gateway were mixed. Ukrainian film critics generally praised its ambition and style, with LB.ua critic Serhiy Ksaverov describing it as “one of the most interesting Ukrainian films” of the year, and calling it a “radioactive phantasmagoria” and a “cinematic mutation” with the makings of a cult classic. NV.ua’s review similarly compliments director Volodymyr Tykhyy’s film, noting that it “avoids any catastrophic mistakes and gives the impression of a complete statement”. The reviewer awarded the film 7/10, praising in particular its use of the Chernobyl Zone as a setting – calling it an “effective metaphor for the entire country [of Ukraine]” In contrast, some critics felt the film was less favorable. Anton Frolov of Cineast felt the theatrical origins undermined the film’s cinematic execution, remarking that “the border between cinema and theatre is small” and that Tykhyy “does not have” the sensibility to bridge it.

=== Audience Reviews ===
Audience reviews were also divided. The film’s July 2018 release sparked heated online debate. As reported by OBOZ.UA, viewer impressions ranging “from delight to outright criticism,” were observed, noting that the social-media response even drew defense of Vitovska after some negative comments.

By some metrics the film’s reception was moderately positive. For example, Ukrainian box-office portal Kinoafisha recorded a 7.7/10 user rating, while the Ukrainian film database DzygaMDB similarly lists an audience score of 7.667/10 (with a critics’ score of 10/10) for Brama.

== Awards and Accolades ==
Event	Year	Category	Recipient	Outcome
Ukrainian Film Academy Awards (Golden Dzyga)	2019	Best Actress	Irma Vitovska	Won
Ukrainian Film Academy Awards (Golden Dzyga)	2019	Best Supporting Actress	Vitalina Bibliv	Won
Ukrainian Film Academy Awards (Golden Dzyga)	2019	Best Music	Anton Baibakov	Won
Ukrainian Film Academy Awards (Golden Dzyga)	2019	Best Make-Up	Katerina Strukova	Won
Ukrainian Film Academy Awards (Golden Dzyga)	2019	Best Film	The Gateway	Nominated
Ukrainian Film Academy Awards (Golden Dzyga)	2019	Best Director	Volodymyr Tykhyi	Nominated
Ukrainian Film Academy Awards (Golden Dzyga)	2019	Best Screenplay	Pavlo Arie	Nominated
Ukrainian Film Academy Awards (Golden Dzyga)	2019	Best Cinematography	Vyacheslav Tsvetkov	Nominated
Ukrainian Film Academy Awards (Golden Dzyga)	2019	Best Production Design	Vladen Odudenko	Nominated
Ukrainian Film Academy Awards (Golden Dzyga)	2019	Best Costume Design	Olga Navrotska	Nominated
Ukrainian Film Academy Awards (Golden Dzyga)	2019	Best Sound	Serhiy Stepansky	Nominated
Fantaspoa International Film Festival	2019	Best Screenplay	The Gateway	Won
Tallinn Black Nights Film Festival	2017	Best Film	The Gateway	Nominated
