= Irma Vitovska =

Ukrainian theater and film actress, producer and public figure

- Ірма Вітовська
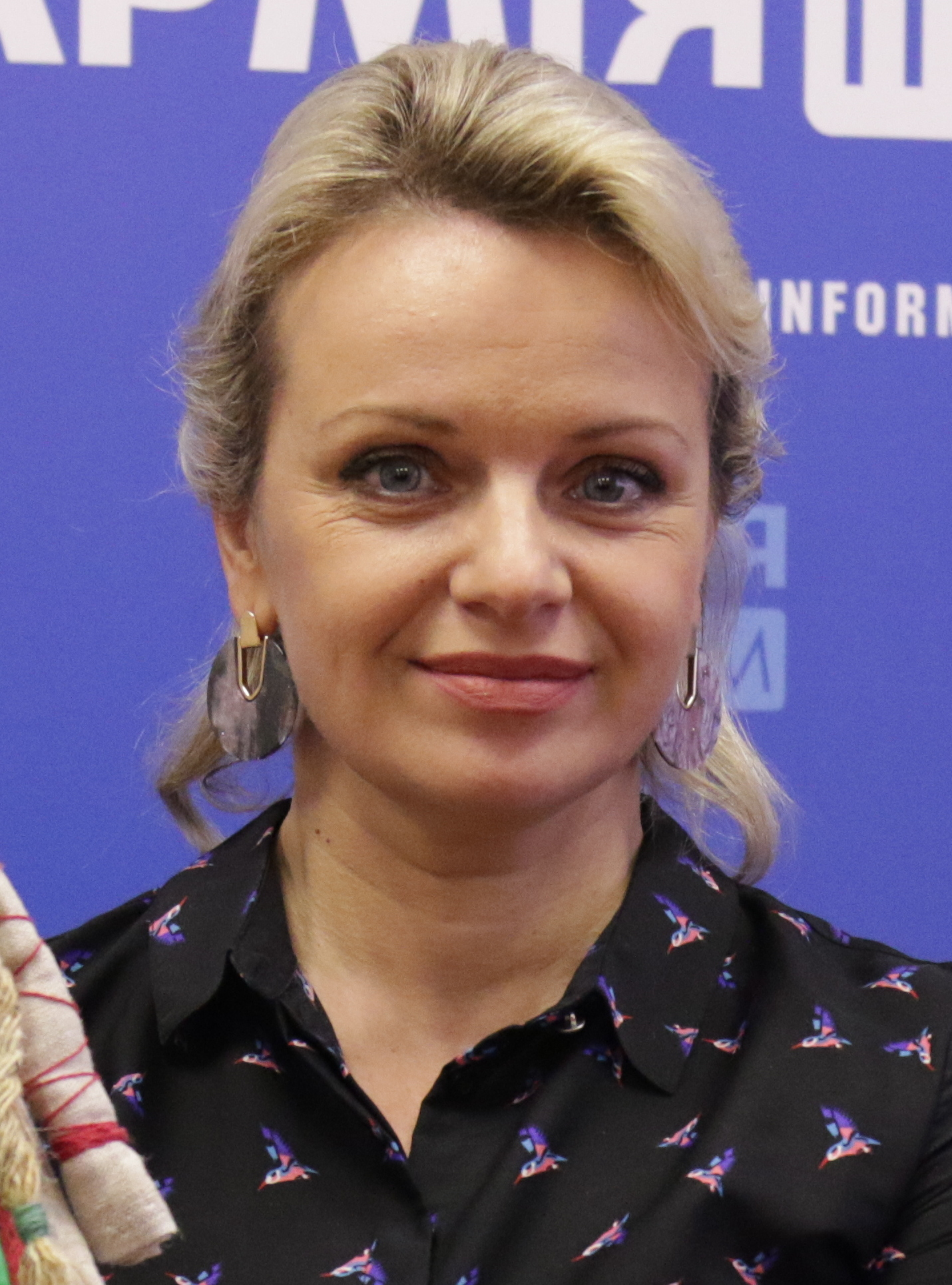
- Born: Iryna Hryhorivna Vitovska; December 30, 1974 (age 51); Ivano-Frankivsk, Ukrainian SSR, Soviet Union

Irma Hryhorivna Vitovska (Ukrainian: Ірма Григорівна Вітовська; born December 30, 1974) is a Ukrainian theater and film actress, producer and public figure, Honored Artist of Ukraine (2016). She has worked at the Young Theater since 1998, and is best known for her role as Lesya in the Ukrainian comedy TV series Lesya+Roma (2005-2007).

== Biography ==
Vitovska was born on December 30, 1974, in Ivano-Frankivsk. Vitovska's father came from the village of Medukha, Halych district, Ivano-Frankivsk region. Her maternal great-grandfather is Russian, and his wife is Latvian.

She dreamed of becoming an archaeologist, and for several years in a row she tried to enter the Carpathian Institute, Stefanik. She attended a theater group at the Palace of Pioneers in Ivano-Frankivsk.

In 1998 she graduated from the Lviv State Musical Institute with a degree in Drama Theater acting (course of Bohdan Kozak). Since the same year she has been working at the Kyiv Academic Young Theatre.

She has been a repeated participant of many international theater festivals and received personal awards.

Since October 11, 2015, she has been the coach of the Little Giants show on the 1+1 channel. She was the host of the TV shows Marriage Games, or Number for the newlyweds (Ukrainian: Sweetheart games, or number for young people Home games, or number for young people) and People's Star (Ukrainian: Narodna Zirka People's Zirka) on the ICTV channel. She took part in the vocal show People's Star on the TV channel "Ukraine".

== Political position ==
Irma Vitovska is an activist of the "Revolution of Dignity" and "Language Maidan", a participant in all pro-Ukrainian protests.

In June 2018, she recorded a video message in support of the Ukrainian director Oleg Sentsov, imprisoned in Russia.

== Charity ==
Irma Vitovska has been a participant in the social and public programs "Street Children" since 2007 and "Stop Bill" since 2011.

In 2014, Irma Vitovska started making motanka dolls, selling them, and donates the proceeds to help the army. The most expensive cost 2000 hryvnia. These funds were used to purchase underpants for the Coast Guard and plastic prayer cards for the Fifth Battalion.

With Irena Karpa, Irma Vitovska raised money at a creative evening for shoes for the battalion of the Ukrainian Volunteer Corps "Right Sector".

Irma Vitovska, as a member of the StopBill movement, initiated and starred in the Oscar and the Pink Lady art project, created to raise funds for the needs of terminally ill children. The premiere of the performance took place on October 7 in Ivano-Frankivsk and on October 11 in Kyiv, received several theatrical awards and raised more than 700,000 hryvnias for palliative children's departments, as well as mobile teams that will work with such children.

Irma Vitovska donated most of her fee for filming in the TV series Robbery Like a Woman for the treatment of the wounded in the ATO.

== Personal life ==
- First husband - Vladimir Kokotunov (born May 1, 1969), actor of the Young Theater
  - Son - Orest Kokotunov-Vitovsky (born March 29, 2011)
- Second husband - Vitaliy Vantsa (born 1978), a businessman from Borislav, Lviv region.
- Vitovska's younger sister, Natalya, is married to lawyer Stanislav Lieberman, the brother of singer Tina Karol.

== Theater works ==
=== Kyiv National Academic Molodyy Theatre ===
- 1980 - "Chasing Two Hares" by M. Staritsky; Director Viktor Shulakov - Frantiha / Cinema Star (introduction)
- 1985 - "Ash Chicken" by Vladimir Orlov; director Viktor Shulakov - Frog (input)
- 1991 - "The King and the Carrot, or everything is like in a fairy tale" by Vladislav Ksheminsky; director Ya. Kozlov - Herold
- 1998 - "Baby" by J. de Letraz; director Vladimir Begma - Lulu / Kristin
- 1999 - "REKHUVILIYZOR" by N. Gogol and N. Kulish; director Stanislav Moiseev - Maria Antonovna
- 2000 - "The Little Mermaid" by L. Razumovskaya by H. Andersen; director - Evgeny Kurman - The Little Mermaid
- 2000 - "Seville engagement" by R. Sheridan; director Evgeny Kurman - Clara / Lauretta
- 2000 - "The Tragedy of Hamlet, Prince of Denmark" by W. Shakespeare; director Stanislav Moiseev - actress
- 2000 - "Kaidashi" by Natalia Dubina after I. Nechuy-Levitsky; director Nikolai Yaremko - Melashka
- 2001 - "Steel Will" by M. Kurochkin; director Dmitry Bogomazov - Stalova Volya
- 2002 - "The Wizard of the Emerald City" by F. Baum, A. Volkov; director G. Vorotchenko - Ellie
- 2002 - "Dance of Love" by A. Schnitzler; director Stanislav Moiseev - Grisette
- 2004 - "Pickled Aristocrat" by Irena Koval; director Stanislav Moiseev - Wife
- 2006 - "Moskoviada" by Y. Andrukhovych; director Stanislav Moiseev - Galya
- 2007 - "The Fourth Sister" by J. Glovatsky; director Stanislav Moiseev - Katya
- 2009 - "Torchalov" by Nikita Voronov; director Stanislav Moiseev - Lizaveta
- 2014 - "Deceit and love" by F. Schiller; director Andrey Bilous - Miller's wife
- 2015 - "Stalkers" by Pavel Arye; director Stas Zhirkov - woman Prisya
- 2017 - "Massacre" by Y. Reza; director Vlad Belozorenko - Annette Rey
- "Marriage" by N. Gogol; director Taras Krivoruchenko - Dunyasha
- "Women and War" by Javad el Essedi; directed by Jawad el Essedi - Rahman
- "The Life of the Simple" by Natatya Vorozhbit; director Y. Sidorenko - Lyuba-2

=== Other theaters ===
- 2007 - "It's so easy to help, or Where do children come from?" A. Kryma; director Vitaly Malakhov (charity project-performance)
- 2015 - "Oscar and the Pink Lady" by E. Schmitt; director Rostislav Derzhipolsky (charitable theater project)
- 2017 - "Hamlet" (neo-opera of horrors) based on W. Shakespeare, translated by Yuri Andrukhovych; dir. Rostislav Derzhipolsky (Ukrainian) Russian — Gertrude's Queen of Denmark, Hamlet's mother (Ivano-Frankivsk Regional Academic Music and Drama Theater named after I. Franko)

== Filmography ==
=== Animation ===
- 2004 - Orphan Fox - Fox
- 2005 - Mountain of gems (Series "Sinister (Ukrainian)") - Marichka
- Teletubbies - Lala
- 2008 - Volt - cat Marquise
- 2009 - Cloudy with a Chance of Meatballs
- 2012 - The Lorax - Ted's mother
- 2013 - Cloudy with a Chance of Meatballs 2
- 2014 - Babai - witch

== Awards and nominations ==
- 2001 - nomination of the Kyiv Pectoral award in the category "Best Actress" (The Little Mermaid in the play "The Little Mermaid")
- 2006 - nomination "Acting talent" at the Best Ukrainian Awards
- 2006 - "Teletriumph" in the nomination for the best TV series "Lesya + Roma"
- 2012 - "Teletriumph" in the nomination "Actress of a television film / series (female role)"
- 2015 - Laureate of the Kyiv Pectoral Award in the category "Best Actress" (Baba Prisya in the play "Stalkers" of the joint project of the Golden Gate Theater and the Young Theatre)
- 2015 — national competition "Charitable Ukraine-2015" for the play "Oscar and the Pink Lady"
- 2016 - Honored Artist of Ukraine
- 2018 — laureate of the Kinokolo award, the best actress of 2018. Brahma, dir. V. Quiet
- 2018 — laureate of "Woman of the Year 2018"
- 2018 - winner of the "Gold Dziga" best female role
- 2018 — laureate of "Women in art" category "theater and cinema" from the UN and "Ukrainian Institute"
- 2019 - laureate of the "Golden Duke" at the OIFF. Best acting work "My thoughts, quiet"
- 2019 - "Kіnokolo" best actress for "My thoughts are quiet"
- 2021 — entered the top 100 successful women of Ukraine according to Novoye vryamya magazine.
