= Rag doll =

Doll with a stuffed cloth body and head

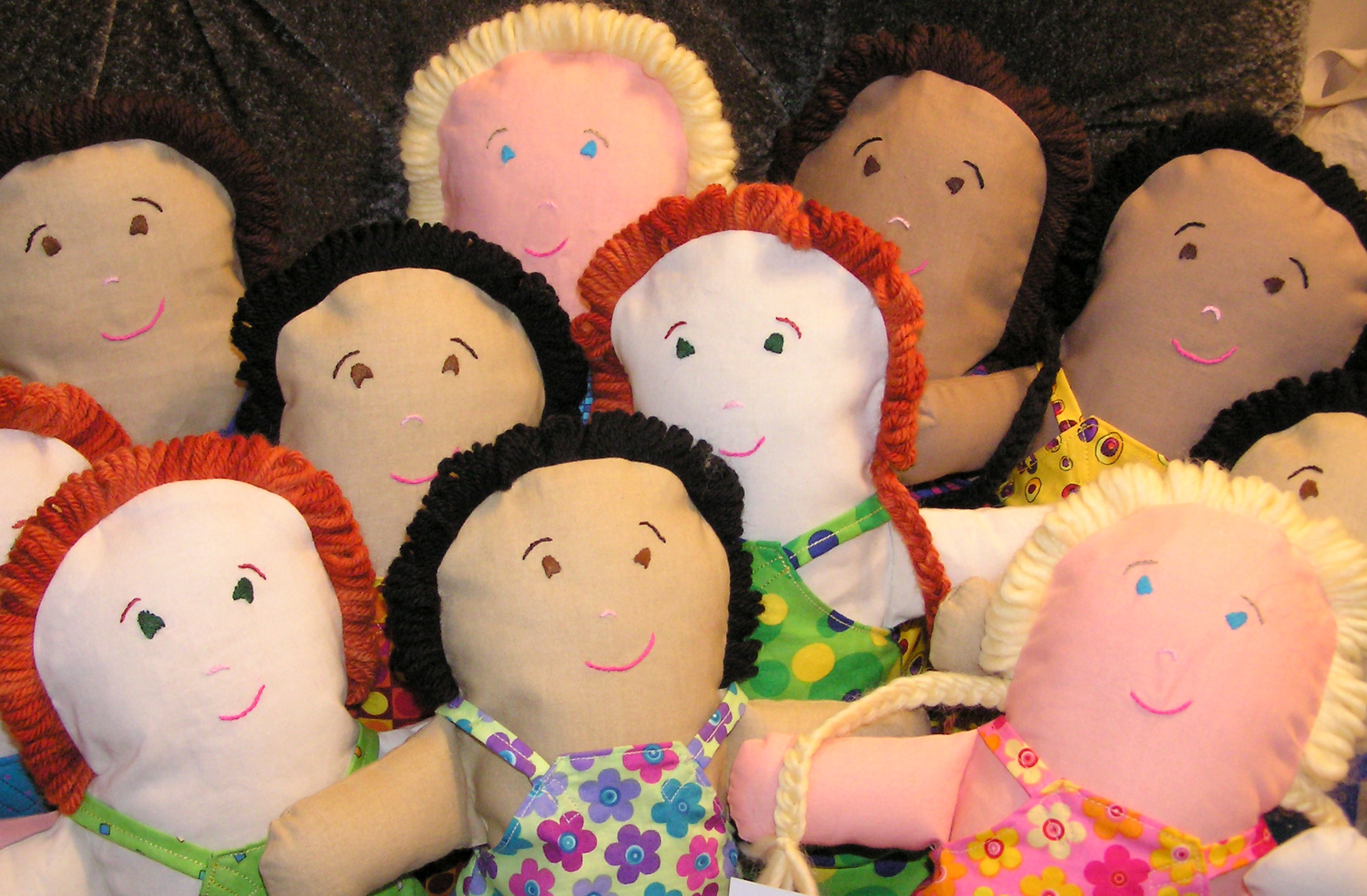
Handmade rag dolls

A rag doll is a doll made from scraps of fabric. In modern times, many rag dolls are commercially produced to mimic aspects of the original home-made dolls, such as simple features, soft cloth bodies, and patchwork clothing.

== History ==
In their earlier forms, rag dolls were made out of cloth scraps or cornhusks. In the 19th and 20th centuries, rag dolls were made out of stockinette, felt, or velvet. The British Museum has a Roman rag doll, found in a child's grave dating from the 1st to 5th century AD. Historically, rag dolls have been used as comfort objects, and to teach young children nurturing skills. They were often used to teach children how to sew, as the children could practice sewing clothes for the doll and make some simple dolls themselves. In North America, from the colonial era up to the early 20th century, children of various statuses would play with dolls made from rags or cornhusks. Mass production of rag dolls began around 1830, when fabric color printing was first developed.

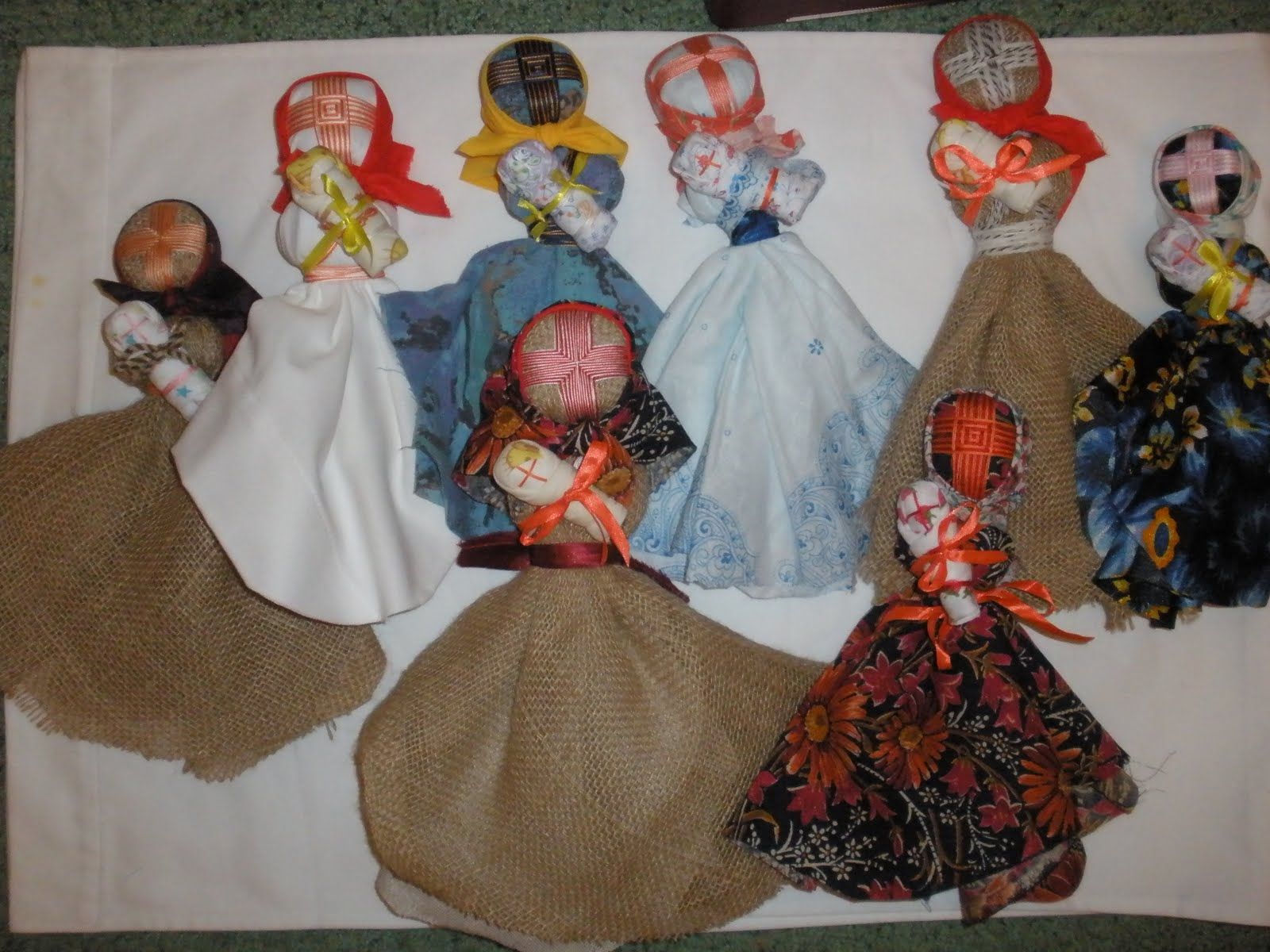
Motanka dolls from Ukraine

Motanka dolls (Polish motanka, Ukrainian мо́танка, from motać/мотати - to tangle/spool/wind) are a type of traditional amulet dolls made in Poland, Ukraine, and Belarus. They were a part of folk culture and its magical beliefs, made and tied without the use of a needle or other sharp objects, to "not poke/hurt the fate" and traditionally had no facial features, sometimes with a cross instead. Motanka dolls were made with specific intentions and wishes/tasks for them to grant, of various sorts, such as guarding the family or a prosperous marriage. Nowadays motanka dolls are coming back to popularity as a part of interest in Slavic cultures of the past, often as an educational device during educational and ethnographic workshops, or as a work of folk artists.

In modern times, many rag dolls are commercially produced to mimic aspects of the original home-made dolls, such as simple features, soft cloth bodies, and patchwork clothing. One prominent example of a commercially produced rag doll is the Raggedy Ann doll. Raggedy Ann first appeared in 1918 as the main character of a series of children's stories by Johnny Gruelle. Raggedy Andy, her brother, was introduced in 1920.

== See also ==
- Stuffed toy
- Motanka doll
