= Vasylkiv urban hromada =

Vasylkiv urban hromada Васильківська міська громада
- Hromada
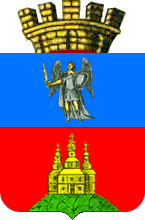
- Seal
- Interactive map of Vasylkiv urban hromada
- Country: Ukraine
- Oblast: Kyiv
- Raion: Obukhiv

Area
  - Total: 356.5 km^{2} (137.6 sq mi)

Population (2020)
  - Total: 45,406
  - Density: 127.4/km^{2} (329.9/sq mi)
- Settlements: 20
- Cities: 1
- Villages: 19

Vasylkiv urban hromada (Ukrainian: Васильківська міська громада) is a hromada of Ukraine, located in Obukhiv Raion, Kyiv Oblast. Its administrative center is the city Vasylkiv.

It has an area of 356.5 square kilometres (137.6 mi^{2}) and a population of 45,406, as of 2020.

The hromada contains 20 settlements: 1 city (Vasylkiv), and 19 villages:

- Barakhty
- Bezpiatne
- Velyka Buhaivka
- Velyka Vilshanka
- Zarichchia
- Zastuhna
- Zdorivka
- Zozuli
- Kodaky
- Kulibaba
- Lubianka
- Mytnytsia
- Pohreby
- Trostynka
- Chervone
- Chervone
- Chervone Pole
- Shevchenkivka
- Yatsky

== See also ==
- List of hromadas of Ukraine
