= Vasylkiv =

City in Kyiv Oblast, Ukraine

Vasylkiv Василькiв
- City
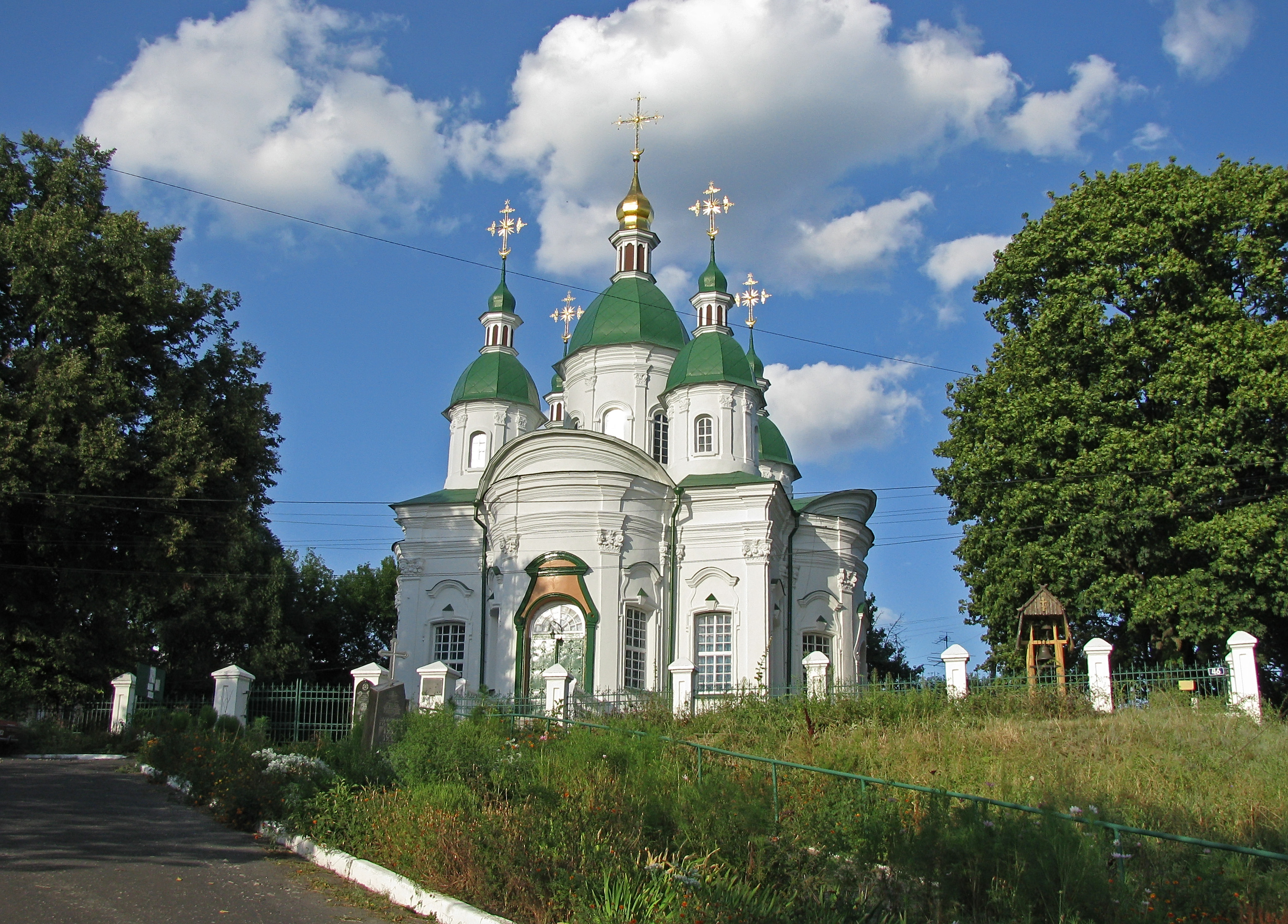
- Cathedral of Anthony and Theodosius

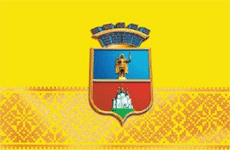
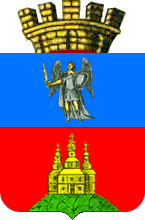
- Flag Coat of arms
- Interactive map of Vasylkiv
- Location of Vasylkiv Vasylkiv (Ukraine)
- Coordinates: 50°10′42″N 30°18′57″E
- Country: Ukraine
- Oblast: Kyiv Oblast
- Raion: Obukhiv Raion
- Hromada: Vasylkiv urban hromada
- First mentioned: 988
- Magdeburg law: 1586

Area
  - Total: 29.6 km^{2} (11.4 sq mi)

Population (2022)
  - Total: 37,068
- Postal code: 8600–8612
- Area code: +380 4571

Vasylkiv (Ukrainian: Васильків, IPA: [wɐsɪlʲˈkiu̯], Russian: Васильков, romanized: Vasilkov) is a city on the Stuhna River in Obukhiv Raion, Kyiv Oblast, central Ukraine. It hosts the administration of Vasylkiv urban hromada, one of the hromadas of Ukraine. First mentioned in the 10th century, Vasylkiv was incorporated as a city in 1796.

The city hosts Vasylkiv Air Base and is an industrial centre, producing electrical appliances and leather goods. Population: 37,068 (2022 estimate). 39,084 (2024 estimate).

== Geography ==
Vasylkiv is located on the Stuhna river, a tributary of Dnieper.

== History ==
=== Middle Ages ===
Vasylkiv was founded in 988 CE by prince Volodymyr the Great. According to legends, it was the location of Volodymyr's baptism and a place where he was saved from an attack by Pechenegs. The Church of Annunciation was constructed in the city under Volodymyr's rule. The town was fortified in the 11th century. According to the Primary Chronicle, it was the place where Volodymyr's numerous wives lived. After the Christianization of Kyiv, Volodymyr built there a fortress and named it Vasilev, after his patron saint, Saint Basil (Vasily).

In the early 11th century, it was the birthplace of Saint Theodosius of Kiev. The Anthony and Theodosius Pechersky Church, built in the Ukrainian Baroque style in the 1750s, commemorates both Theodosius and Anthony of Kiev.

In 1240, the city was destroyed by the invading Mongol Empire.

=== Early Modern era ===
In 1658, the Russian military commander Yuri Baryatinsky defeated the army of hetman Ivan Vyhovsky's brother Konstantin near Vasylkiv, after the Ukrainian hetman switched sides in favour of the Polish–Lithuanian Commonwealth.

The first medical quarantine house in Ukraine was established in Vasylkiv in 1740. Under the rule of Russian Empire, Vasylkiv served as an povit centre. It was incorporated as a city in 1796. Russian troops in Vasylkiv took part in the failed Decembrist revolt against the Russian Empire in 1825 (see Chernigov Regiment revolt).

=== Ukrainian War of Independence ===
In 1918–1919, the city was captured from Bolshevik control by the nationalist Ukrainian army several times. On February 28 the Battle of Vasylkiv took place. In February 1919, Petlyura's armies conducted pogroms in Vasilkov, massacring 50 Jews and 60 Russians suspected of being Communists; the Jewish community was forced to pay a special contribution. On April 5, the city was occupied by Ataman Zeleny's rebels.

During the Ukrainian War of Independence, Marko Shlyakhovy, aka Ataman Karmelyuk, based a nationalist unit in the Kladova tract near the village of Dzvinkova, which conducted combat operations against the Bolsheviks together with Ataman Zeleny's units. On August 24, 1919, during the offensive on Kiev, Vasilkov was approached by units of the UNR Army. After a battle Vasylkiv was captured from Red Army troops by the Black Zaporizhzhia Cavalry Regiment. Bolshevik rule over the city was eventually established in 1920.

=== Modern period ===
When the Soviet regime was established, Jewish communal life was discontinued. In 1926 the Jews in Vasylkiv numbered 3,061 (14.4% of the total population). The total population of the town in 1933 reached 21,000 inhabitants. In 1941 the Jews of Vasilkov were exterminated by the Nazis.

Until 18 July 2020, Vasylkiv was incorporated as a city of oblast significance and served as the administrative center of Vasylkiv Raion even though it did not belong to the raion. In July 2020, as part of the administrative reform of Ukraine, which reduced the number of raions of Kyiv Oblast to seven, the city of Vasylkiv was merged into Obukhiv Raion.

=== Russian invasion of Ukraine ===
In the early morning of 26 February 2022, Russian invasion forces landed near the city in an attempt to capture the Vasylkiv Air Base, resulting in the Battle of Vasylkiv. According to the city's mayor Natalia Balasinovich, the fighting had died down by later that day, with Ukraine still in possession of the city.

Claims have been made that Ukrainian aircraft shot down two Russian Ilyushin Il-76 aircraft transporting assault troops. According to Ukrainian accounts, the first plane was reportedly shot down at Vasylkiv airbase, "killing upwards of 250 elite Russian paratroopers with a single missile." A second plane was also claimed to have been shot down over Bila Tserkva, which was allegedly carrying over 100 paratroopers. As of 18 January 2024, claims that Ukraine had killed 350 paratroopers in the downed planes were still unconfirmed by independent sources.

In the morning of 27 February 2022, Russian forces struck an oil depot in the city, leading to large explosions and fires.

== Economy ==
Vasylkiv has historically served as a centre of leather and shoe production, food and construction industries, and housed a majolica factory.

== Population ==
=== Language ===
Distribution of the population by native language according to the 2001 census:

| Language | Percentage |
|---|---|
| Ukrainian | 87.29% |
| Russian | 12.19% |
| other/undecided | 0.52% |

== Gallery ==
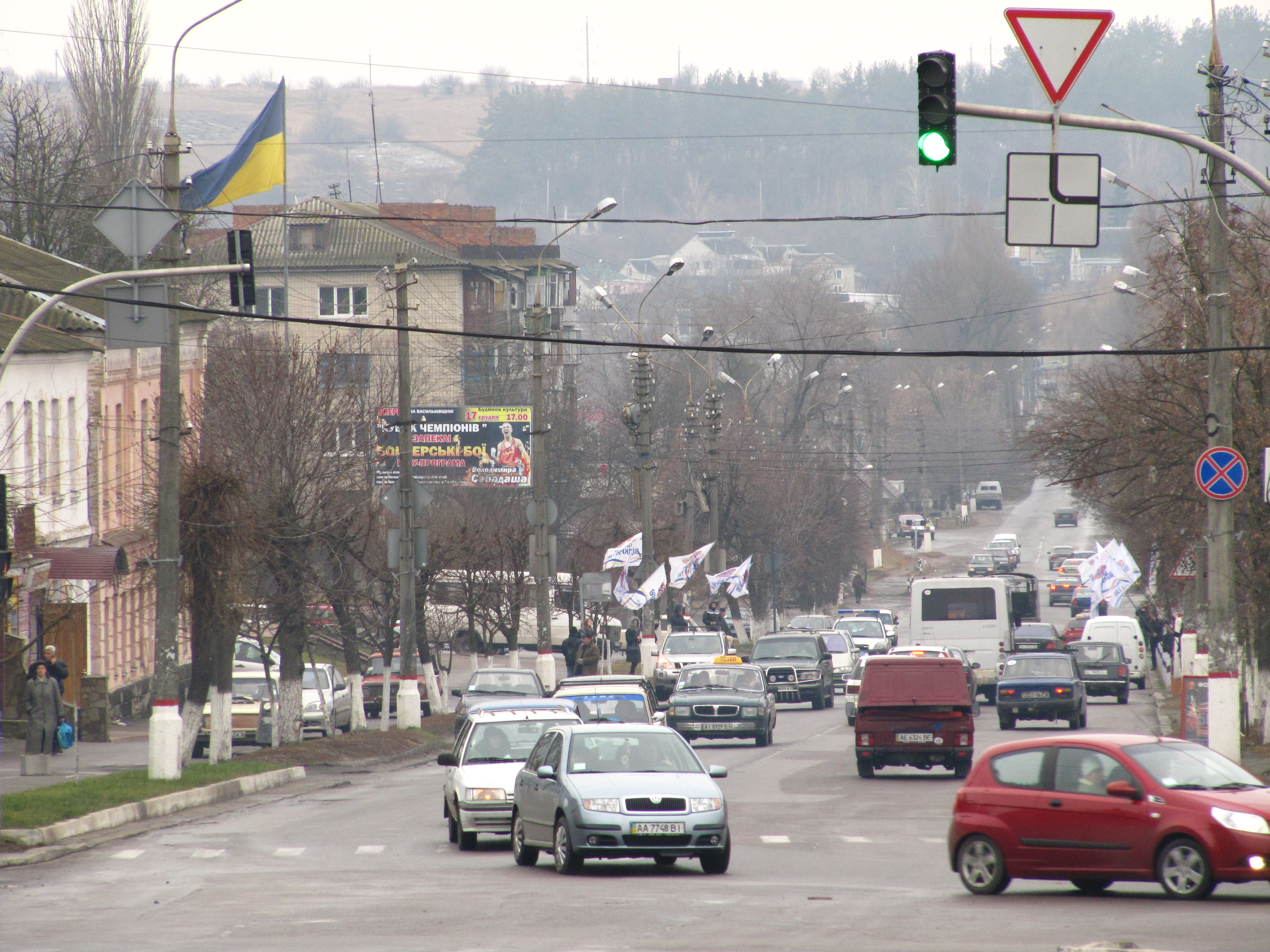
A street in the downtown

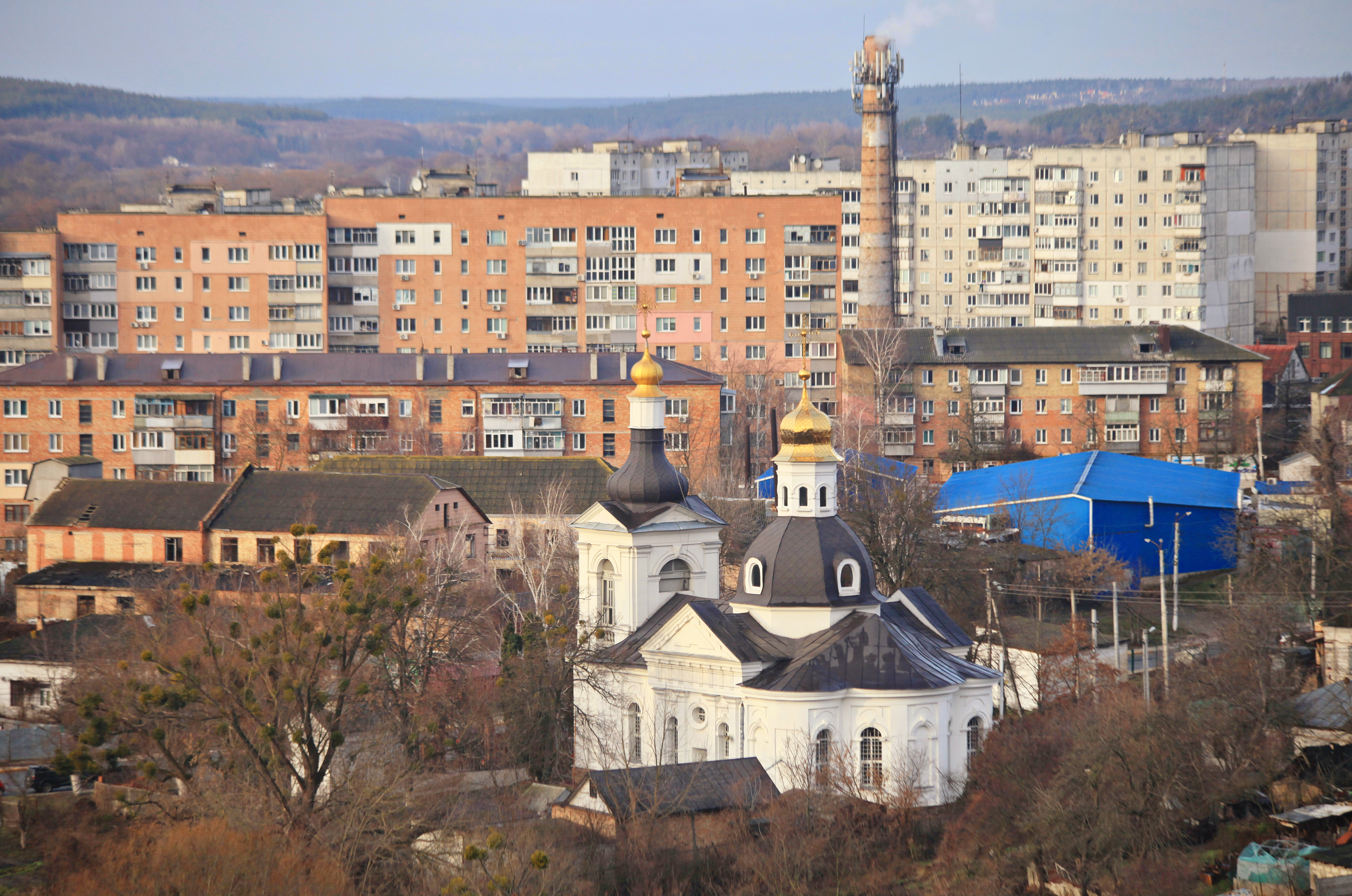
City panorama

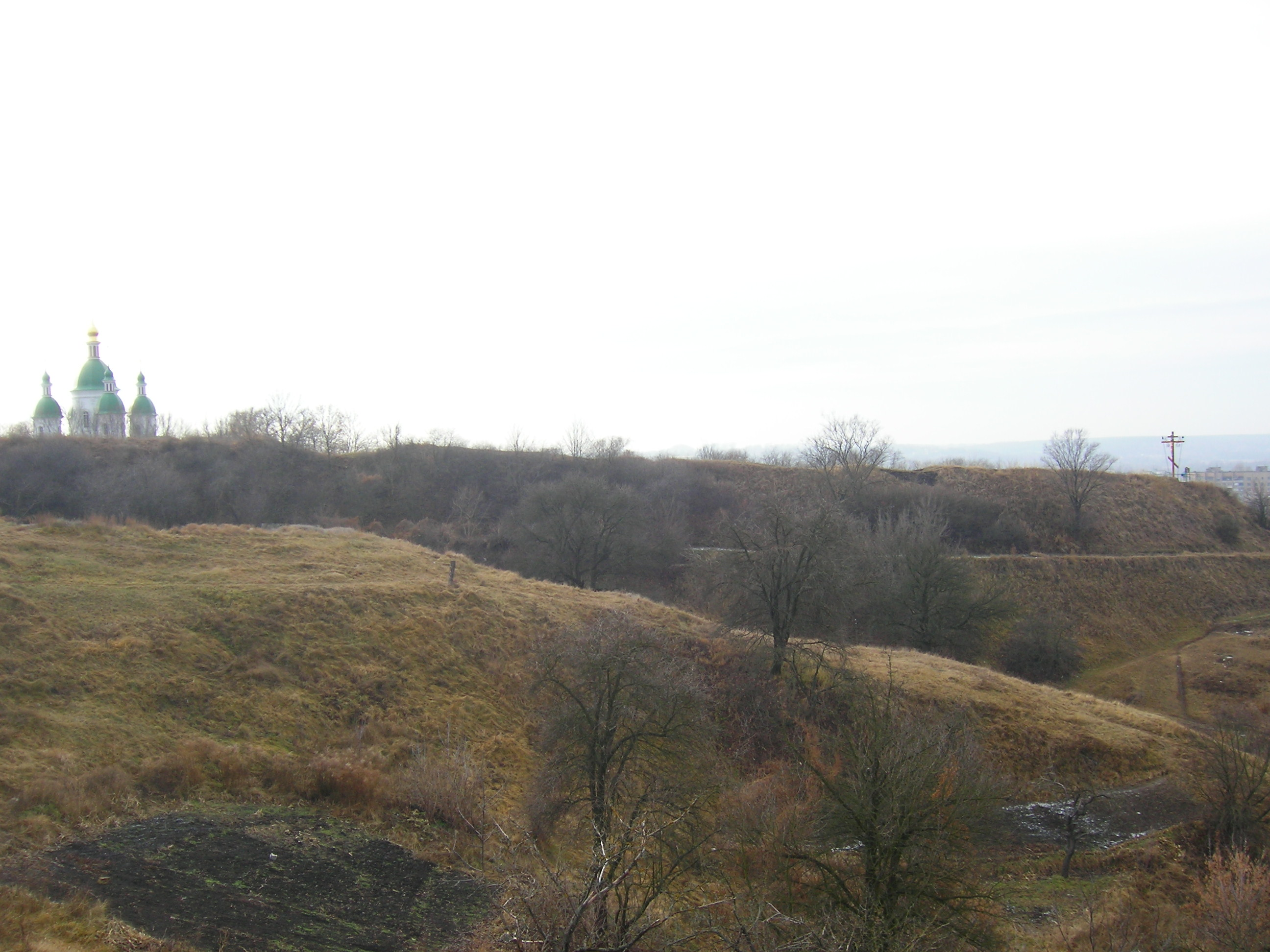
Remnants of medieval defensive walls in the city

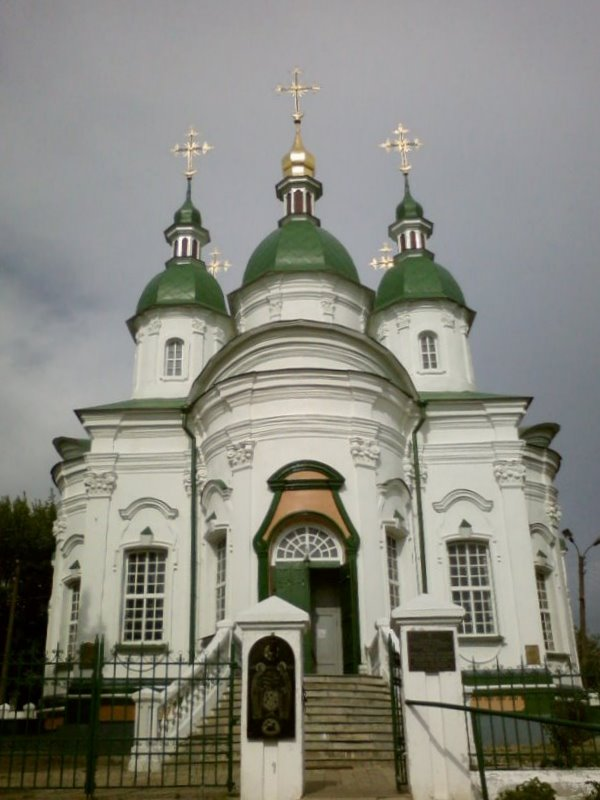
Sts. Anthony and Theodosius Cathedral (18th century)

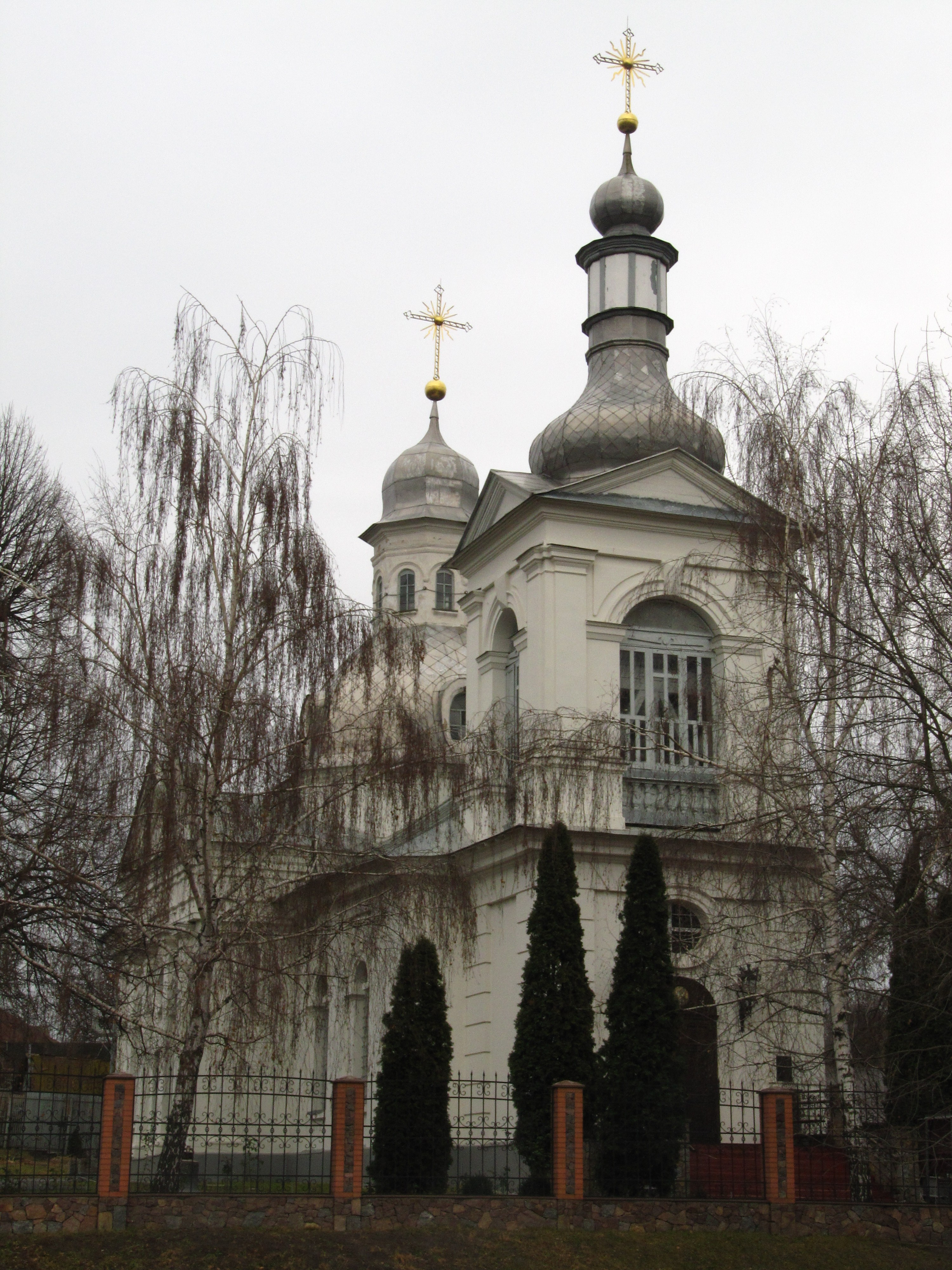
St. Nicholas Church (18th century)

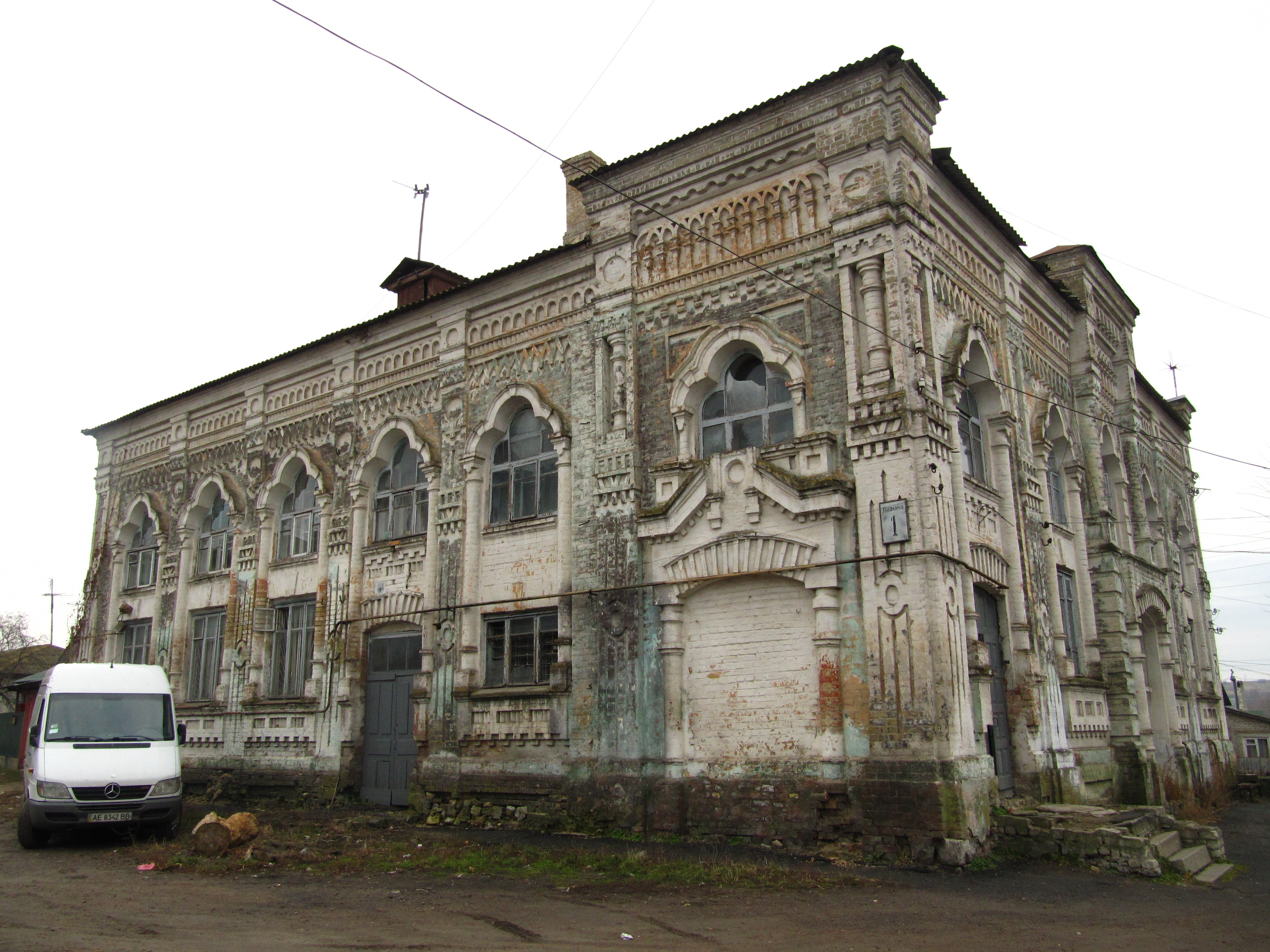
Former synagogue, later "Vasylkiv-2" railway station terminal (19th century)

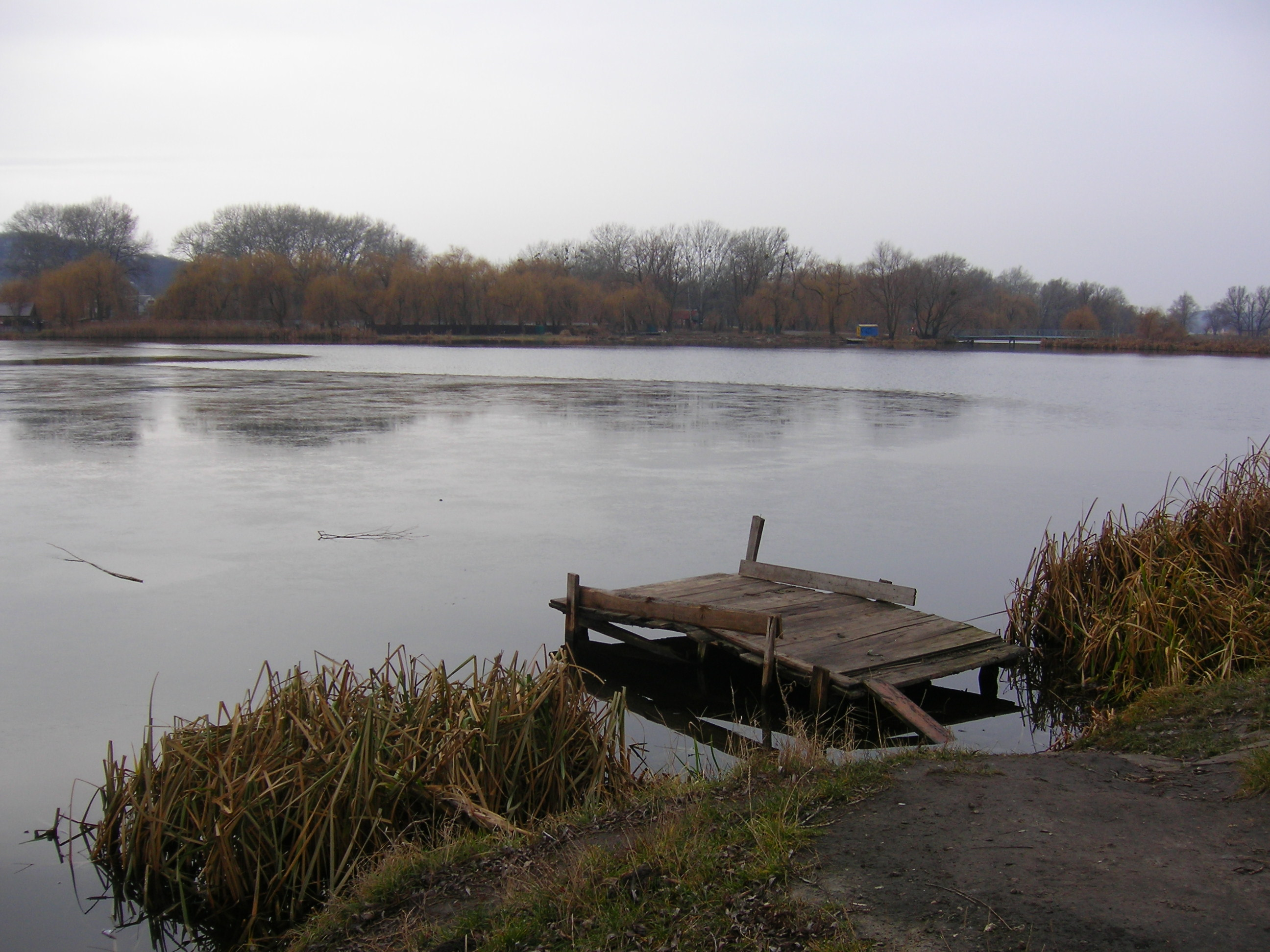
Stuhna River in Vasylkiv

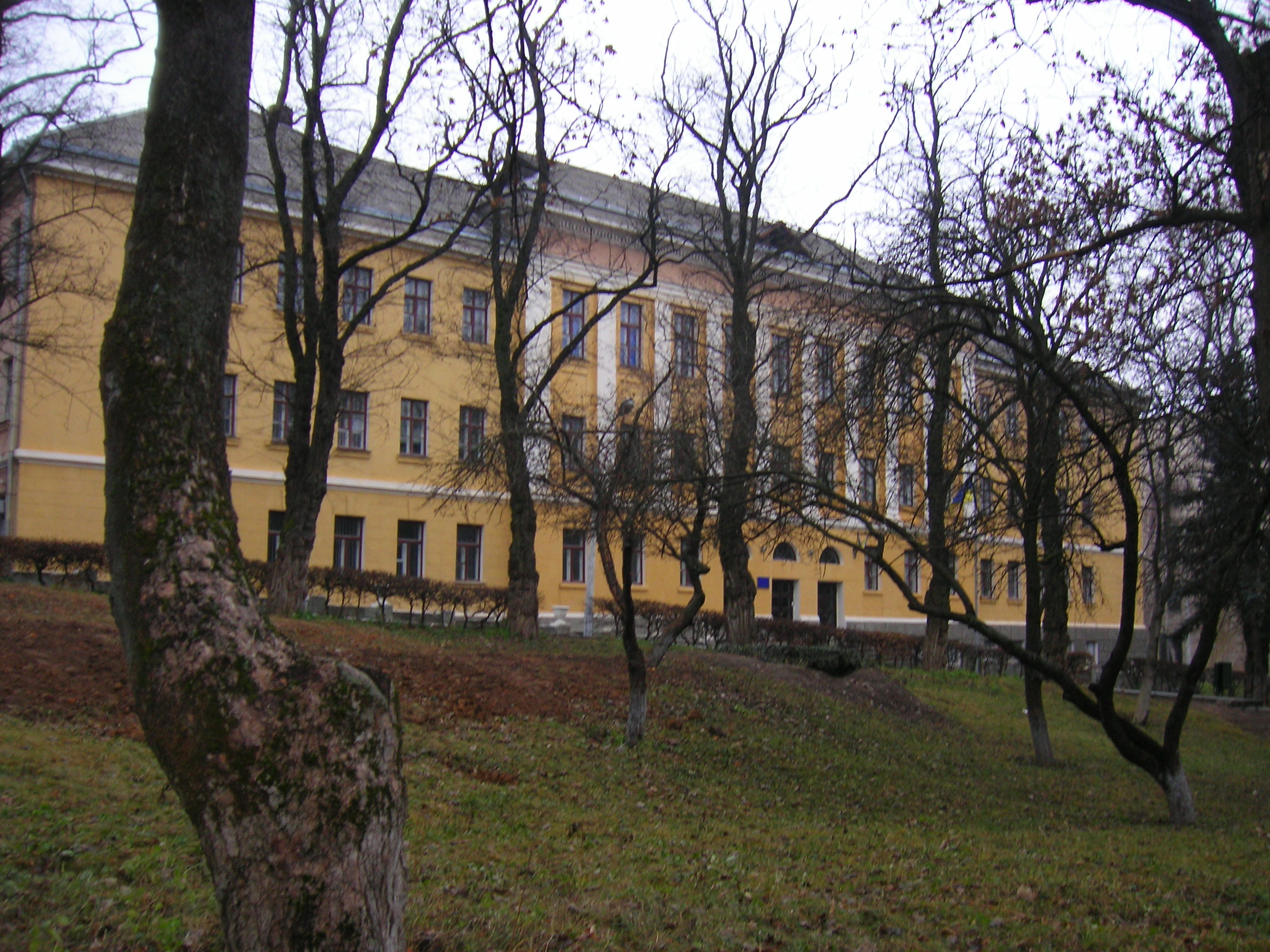
Vasylkiv Air Force College building

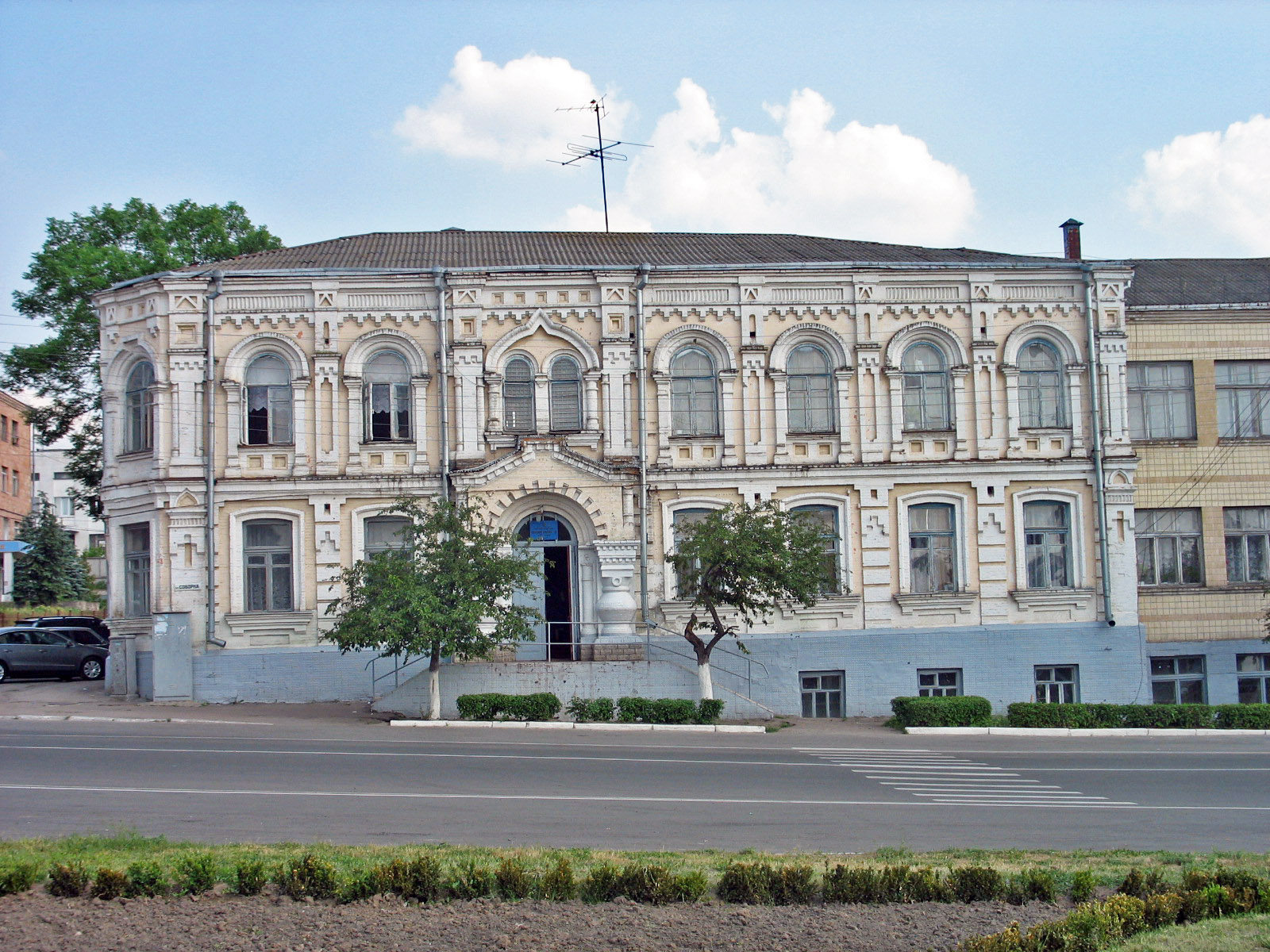
A school

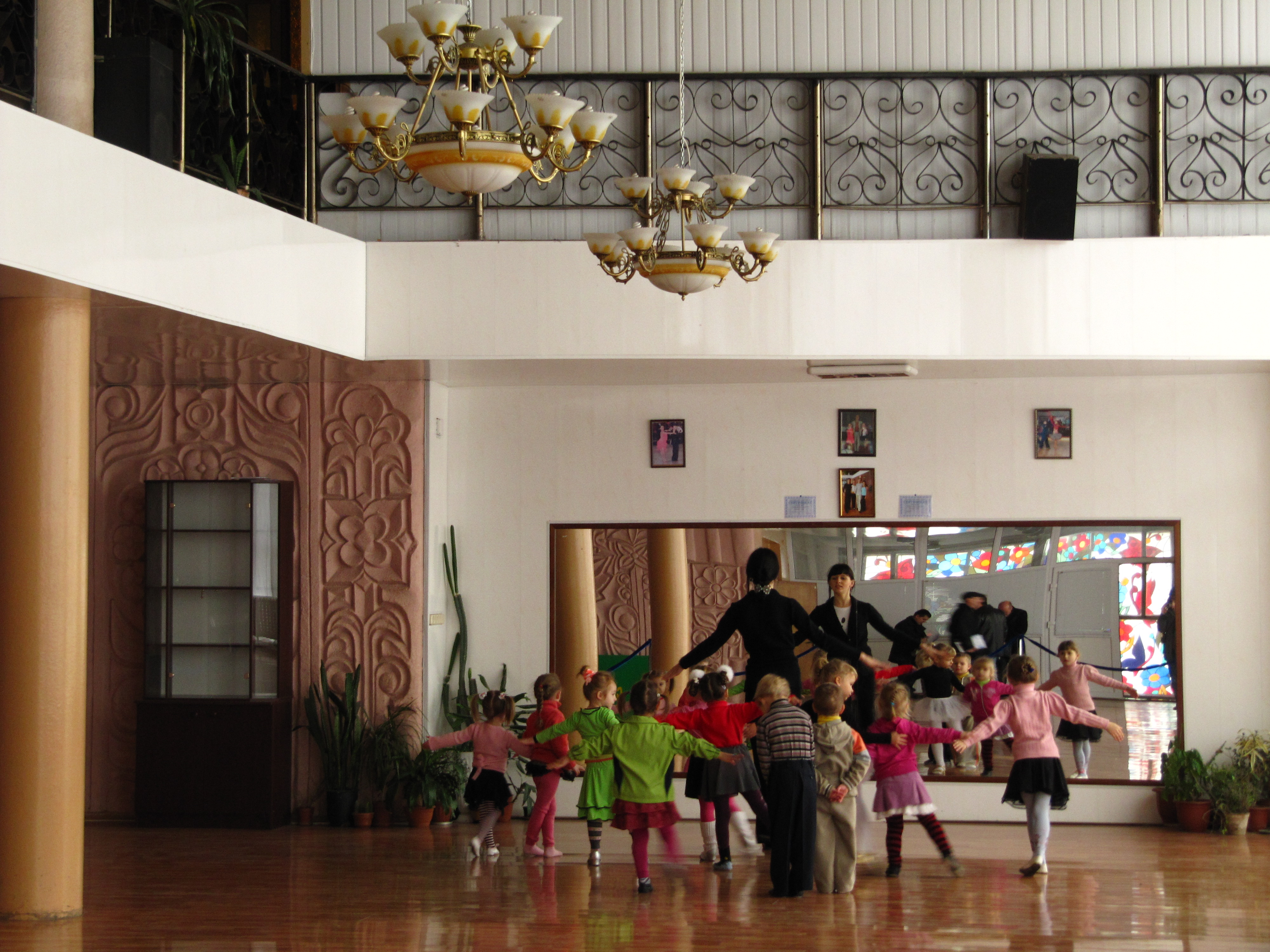
Children dance studio lesson in Vasylkiv Culture House

== Notable people ==
- Theodosius of Pechersk (1009–1074) – Eastern Orthodox saint and missionary
- Petro Poletyka (1778–1849) – Russian imperial statesman of Ukrainian origin
- Mykola Melnychenko (born 1966) – member of Ukrainian security services and political personality
- Vitalina Bibliv (born 1980) – Ukrainian actress
- Jerry Heil (born 1995) – Ukrainian singer, songwriter, and YouTuber
