= Eduard Akhramovych =

Ukrainian entrepreneur

- Едуард Станіславович Ахрамович
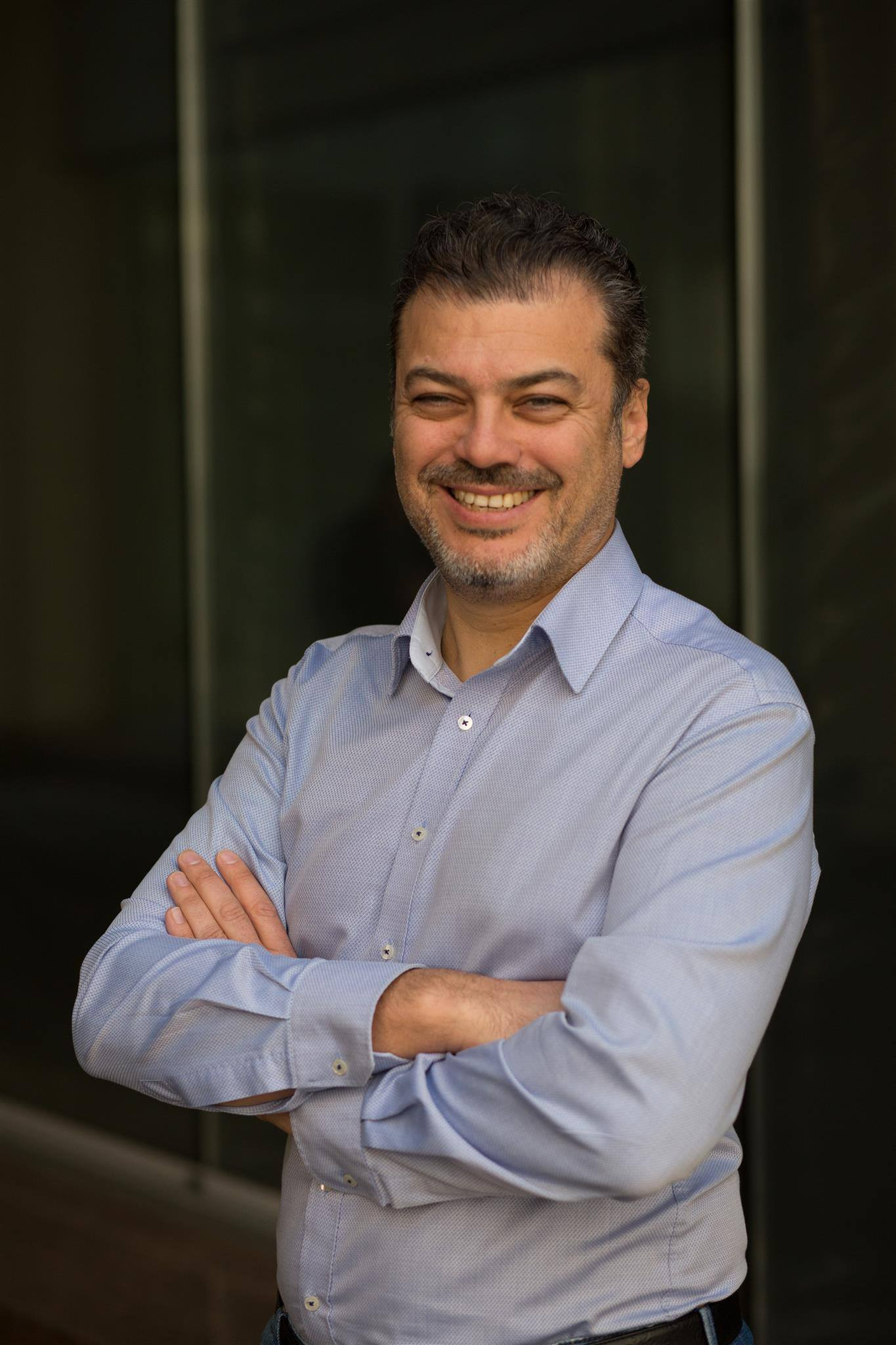
- Born: 22 May 1972 (age 54); Kyiv, Ukrainian Soviet Socialist Republic
- Education: Taras Shevchenko National University of Kyiv
- Occupation: Serial entrepreneur

Eduard Stanislavovich Akhramovych (Ukrainian: Едуард Станіславович Ахрамович; born 22 May 1972, in Kyiv) is a Ukrainian serial entrepreneur, founder, and CEO of Art Nation Group, producer, an expert in loyalty and phygital products. He produces internationally licensed brands in Ukraine, animated films, books with augmented reality, and loyalty programs.

== Biography ==
In 1991, he graduated from the Kyiv Optical-Mechanical College. From 1993 to 1997, he studied at the Higher School of Economics and Business Administration "Azio-College" (Bachelor's degree). In 2001, Akhramovych obtained a master's degree from the Economics Faculty of Taras Shevchenko National University of Kyiv. In 2004, he graduated from the Institute of Intellectual Property under the Department of Intellectual Property of Ukraine. In 2007–2008, he underwent training at the Kyiv-Mohyla Business School (KMBS)

While still a student, in 1994, Akhramovych began his entrepreneurial career founding one of the first music stores in Kyiv "Two Melomans" (Ukrainian: Два меломана, romanized: Dva melomana).

In 1999, Eduard Akhramovych established a separate company for the production, acquisition of rights, and release of its own products. The company was named the "National Multimedia Company" (NMC). The company produced karaoke, games, MP3, DVD, Video-CDs, MP4, and encyclopedias.

From 1999 to 2012, he was the founder of LLC "NMC" and LLC "NMC-Trade," which were engaged in the development, production, and promotion of multimedia products. In 2001, Eduard Akhramovych founded the All-Ukrainian Association of Computer Clubs focused on the legalization of computer games and computer clubs in Ukraine. Akhramovych was delegated to negotiate with American corporations, owners of rights to Counter-Strike and Quake.

In 2001, Eduard Akhramovych founded the All-Ukrainian Association of Computer Clubs focused on the legalization of computer games and computer clubs in Ukraine. Akhramovych was delegated to negotiate with American corporations, owners of rights to Counter-Strike and Quake.

In 2002, he founded the company "CD-com". The company was engaged in the production of karaoke products in the CIS market. Also, "CD-com" worked with companies such as LG, Samsung, BBK, Panasonic, Sony. The company also released musical discs and Video game

In 2004, he founded the company "Peak-Video," which produced all Home video products - DVD, Video-CD, MP4. In 2005, he began cinematographic activities by opening the Ukrainian representative office of the distribution company "Luxor-Ukraine." One of the 10 most active film rental companies, it was responsible for the rental of films such as "The Descent" by Neil Marshall and "Collision" by Paul Higgins

In 2010, he founded the company "Internet Rights Agency", which since 2011 has become an official partner of YouTube. As of 2024, it is the only certified Google partner in Ukraine.

In 2011, he founded the first licensed agency in Ukraine, UDC Licensing Agency, focused on licensing in Ukraine, design and product design, loyalty programs, promo campaigns, and sponsorship. From 2012 to 2017, he headed the state film studio "Ukrаnimafilm".

In 2014, he produced the first Ukrainian full-length rental animated film "Babai". It was released in Ukraine, Belarus, Kazakhstan, and the Russian Federation. On December 18, 2014, it was released in Ukraine on a record number of screens for Ukrainian cinema, 99. Its box office for the first weekend was UAH 960,000. Within a month of release, the box office reached almost 2 million hryvnias.

In 2016, he founded and became the CEO of Art Nation Group. The company manages licensed brands, develops loyalty campaigns for FMCG/grocery retail, and creates marketing strategies. It manages commercial rights to celebrities, and content libraries, creates blockbuster products, and releases books with "augmented reality" (AR).

Eduard Akhramovych was a member of the Expert Commission on Cinematography at the State Agency of Ukraine for Cinema. He is a member of the National Union of Cinematographers of Ukraine.

In 2017, he founded the company Art Nation Loyalty, specializing in the development of gamified loyalty campaigns for FMCG/grocery retail and phygital goods for FMCG. The company has launched more than 30 loyalty campaigns in 6 countries and developed 7 game applications for the retail industry. Art Nation Loyalty was included in the list of 250 promising small and medium-sized Ukrainian companies according to Forbes Ukraine (2023). Art Nation Loyalty is a finalist in the 2024 International Loyalty Awards and has been nominated in 3 categories.

In 2023, he graduated from the Ukrainian Corporate Governance Academy in the field of Corporate Governance. He also studied at the Aspen Institute Kyiv. He is a member of the Union of Ukrainian Entrepreneurs (SUP).

In 2024, together with Art Nation Loyalty, he received the award "Best Trade-Marketing Campaign for Launching a New Product" jointly with the 9-1-1 Pharmacy Chain as part of the first national Big Trade-Marketing Award-2024.

== Personal life ==
Married, has a daughter and a son.

== Filmography ==
He acted as a producer or executive producer of the following films:

- "№201", a short animated film (2013)
- "Liezhn", a short animated film (2013)
- "Ptakhi", a short animated film (2013)
- "Babai", a feature-length animated film (2014)
- "Khalabudka", a short animated film (2014)
- "Attraction", a short animated film (2014)
- "Adventures of Kotygoroshko and his friends", a 4-series animated mini-series (2014)
- "Lahmitko", a short animated film (2016)
- "Cossacks. Football", a 26-series animated series (2016)
- "Kobzar 2015", a short animated film (2017)
- "Cossacks. Around the World", a 3-series animated series (2018)
