= Babay (2014 film) =

2014 Ukrainian animated film

- Directed by: Maryna Medvid
- Written by: Vadim Shinkarev
- Based on: Slavic folklore
- Produced by: Serhiy Mindlin; Eduard Akhramovych
- Starring: Rada Belova; Irma Vitovska; Ostap Stupka; Olesya Chichelnytska; Kateryna Butska; Andrii Fedinchyk; Yugen Pashin
- Edited by: Sergii Tochyn
- Production company: Ukrainimafilm
- Distributed by: Aurora film (Ukraine); Top Film Distribution (Russia)
- Release date: 18 December 2014 (Ukraine)
- Running time: 78 minutes
- Country: Ukraine
- Languages: Ukrainian; Russian (dubbing); English (dubbing)
- Budget: $2 million
- Box office: 2.5 million Hryvnia

Babay (Ukrainian: «Бабай») (Or sometimes spelled "Babai") is a Ukrainian animation adventure fantasy film shot by Maryna Medvyd at the Ukranimafilm studio. The film tells the story of a beautiful girl who was searching for her parents, who were kidnapped by the Babay. The film premiered in Ukraine on December 18, 2014. It was considered to be the first Ukrainian full-length animated film. The film is based on Slavic mythology with depictions of a chort, Zmey Gorynych and Baba Yaga

== Plot ==
An elderly storyteller tells his grandchildren a story where The Alkonost bird lays one egg per century, her eggs grant one wish to whoever possesses it. She laid an egg and a race happened between Baba Yaga and her Chort fiancé who want a daughter, Zmei Gorynych who wants separate bodies for each head, and Viy who wants to be even richer.

The Chort stops Zmei and Viy but before they reached the egg Babai stole it to wish for his own "Little Babay". Enraged Baba sends the Chort to get the egg, meanwhile at Babai's domain the chort accidentally drops the egg in a well, Babai and The Chort get into a fight while the egg ends up at an elderly couple's house where their wish was a daughter named "Svetlanka" which came true.

Babai sends the Chort to find the egg or Chort's horns are replaced with moose antlers. Years later Svetlanka is a teenager and Chort sees the egg shell on the windowsill, Babai and Chort broke into the house and the couple wanting to protect Svetlanka claim they cooked and ate the egg, Babay kidnaps them to work at his domain for a century. Svetlanka comes home and she knows where Babay lives and goes off on an adventure to save them. A goat, mouse and chicken who live in the house go on their own adventure heading to Babay's domain too. Still unsatisfied Baba sends the Chort again and he follows the animals and Svetlanka too.

Svetlanka solves Zmey's riddles to enter the domain, The animals play cards and chess with Zmey to enter, and the Chort fails in checkers. Babay and Viy talk about starting a film studio that would make movies for the nightmare world. When Svetlanka reached the mansion of Babay she meets Babai, Chort, Baba and Viy, She turns Babay's nightmares into toys and everyone figures out she is the wish of the egg and Svetlanka considers Baba, Chort, Babai and Viy family as soon as the animals arrived seeing the adventure has ended.

The storyteller finishes the story and hands toys to the children and shows he is Babai in disguise, the toys turn into nightmares and scare the children while Chort records. Babai used the footage of the scared children to Viy that reality is better then fabricated. Babai breaks the fourth wall and tells the audience are they afraid of him.

== Cast ==
- Rada Belova — Svitlanka-Zoryanka
- Irma Vitovska - Vedmak
- Ostap Stupka - Chort
- Olesya Chichelnytska - Alkonost, twin girls, horrors
- Kateryna Butska - Big boy
- Andriy Fedinchyk - Misha
- Evgeny Pashin - Grandfather
- Olga Radchuk - Grandma, Goat
- Olena Blinnikova - Kura
- Myroslav Kuvaldin - Cat
- Borys Georgievsky — Kazkar, Babai
- Volodymyr Moiseyenko — Zmiy Horynich (1st and 2nd heads)
- Volodymyr Danilets — Zmiy Horynich (3rd head)
- Andriy Sereda - Viy, the carrier

== Production ==
Towards the development of a project under the working title "Who’s Afraid of Uncle Babai?" The team of 80 people started in 2007, although plans to shoot a full-length film at Ukranimafilm appeared as early as 2005. According to film critic "Ukrainian Truth" Alexander Gusev, the film was developed during the presidency of Leonid Kuchma, but was put on hold because Kuchma had a nickname "Babay" in government structures. The screenwriter was chosen by Vadim Shinkaryov, director - Natalya Marchenkova, composer - Alexander Sparinsky, artists-directors - Eduard Kiric and Irina Smirnova. The voice of the main characters was entrusted to Anatoly Barchuk, Viktor Andrienko, Valery Chiglyaev, Viktor Semiruzmenko, Alexander Bondarenko and others. The film was financed by Goskino at 100% (about 8 million hryvnias), but was later put on hold due to lack of financing for a long time.

In 2011, Goskino and Ukranimafilm signed an additional agreement, and the project was restarted with a new director (Marina Medvid) and a completely new team. According to the director himself, the project was restarted because the previous group did not please Goskino, even though they worked enough time and made a lot of material. The work on the film lasted 2 years. According to producer Eduard Ahmadowich, the film was completed "with pure enthusiasm of the team". The film was performed in a classic cartoon drawing at the studio "Ukranimafilm. The animators drew about 100 thousand drawings. The writer Sofia Andrukhovich worked on the dialogues, giving them a special authenticity. At the time of independence of Ukraine, Babay became the first Ukrainian animated feature project to be released on wide screens.

One of the reasons in creating Babay was to encourage Ukrainian animators to create their own full-length projects.

== Release ==
On October 31, 2014 the cinemas of Ukraine held a presentation of the main characters of Babay and a press conference with the participation of creators and actors. In addition to Ukraine, the film was released in theaters of Russia, Belarus and Kazakhstan. According to the CEO of Ukranimilma and producer Eduard Ahramović, the contract with Russia regarding the rental was signed as early as 2013. He also added: "The rental was under shock, but we did. Why? First of all, it is cultural exports that exist outside politics. We understood that there are people living in Russia who are not indifferent to our culture and animation, among others. On January 24, 2015 the television premiere of Babai took place on the TV channel "Inter". The film is also available for online viewing on Megogo.net and through video on demand. On 10 February 2015, Babai was presented at the 65th Berlin International Film Festival as part of the Ukrainian national stand.

== Reception ==
=== Box Office ===
In the first weekend of distribution in Ukraine, Babai took 3rd place: the film was watched by 25,556 viewers on 99 screens, which brought it 959,183 hryvnia. For the first time in the history of the latest Ukrainian film distribution, two Ukrainian films ("Babai" and "Zhurir") were located in the first ten boxing offices of Ukraine, at which a total of 30,000 tickets were sold over the weekend, making up 13% of the total audience of top ten films. In the second weekend, the film’s selections fell by 62%, resulting in it dropping to 6th place: Babai was watched by 10,639 viewers on 85 screens, which brought him another 362,615 hryvnia. For the second weekend, the audience of "Babay" and "Shunyra" fell to 7%, and in monetary terms - to 4%. The total fees for 6 weeks of Ukrainian box office amounted to 1 million 926 thousand hryvnia, and as of 18 December the film was watched by 58 thousand viewers.

In Russia, "Babai" was released on 11 December 2014 - a week earlier than in Ukraine. In the first weekend of the Russian release, it took 14th place: the film earned 990 thousand rubles, and watched its 5,105 viewers on 105 screens, which is five times less than in Ukraine. The total fees for 5 weeks of Russian rental amounted to 1 million 31 thousand rubles (about 400 thousand hryvnia).

=== Critics ===
Babay received mostly negative reviews from critics. Alexander Gusev from "Ukrainian Truth" rated the film 0.5 out of 5, writing that it is bad in everything: characters, animation, and script, and others. Boris Ivanov from Film.ru gave the film 3 out of 10, drawing attention to "an old-fashioned two-dimensional animation and an Alaskan color in the spirit of an explosion at a psychedelic factory". Ukrainian film journalists, according to a survey by the Bureau of Ukrainian Film Journalism, called Babay one of the worst films of 2014.

=== Awards and nominatons ===
Babay was nominated for the Lesia Ukrainian Cabinet of Ministers Award for literary and artistic works for children and youth for 2016 in the category "Film works for children and youth", but eventually the cartoon gave way to the art film "Troubadch" director Anatoly Mateshko.
