= Pavlo Arie =

Ukrainian screenwriter and conceptual artist (born 1977)

- Павло Ар'є
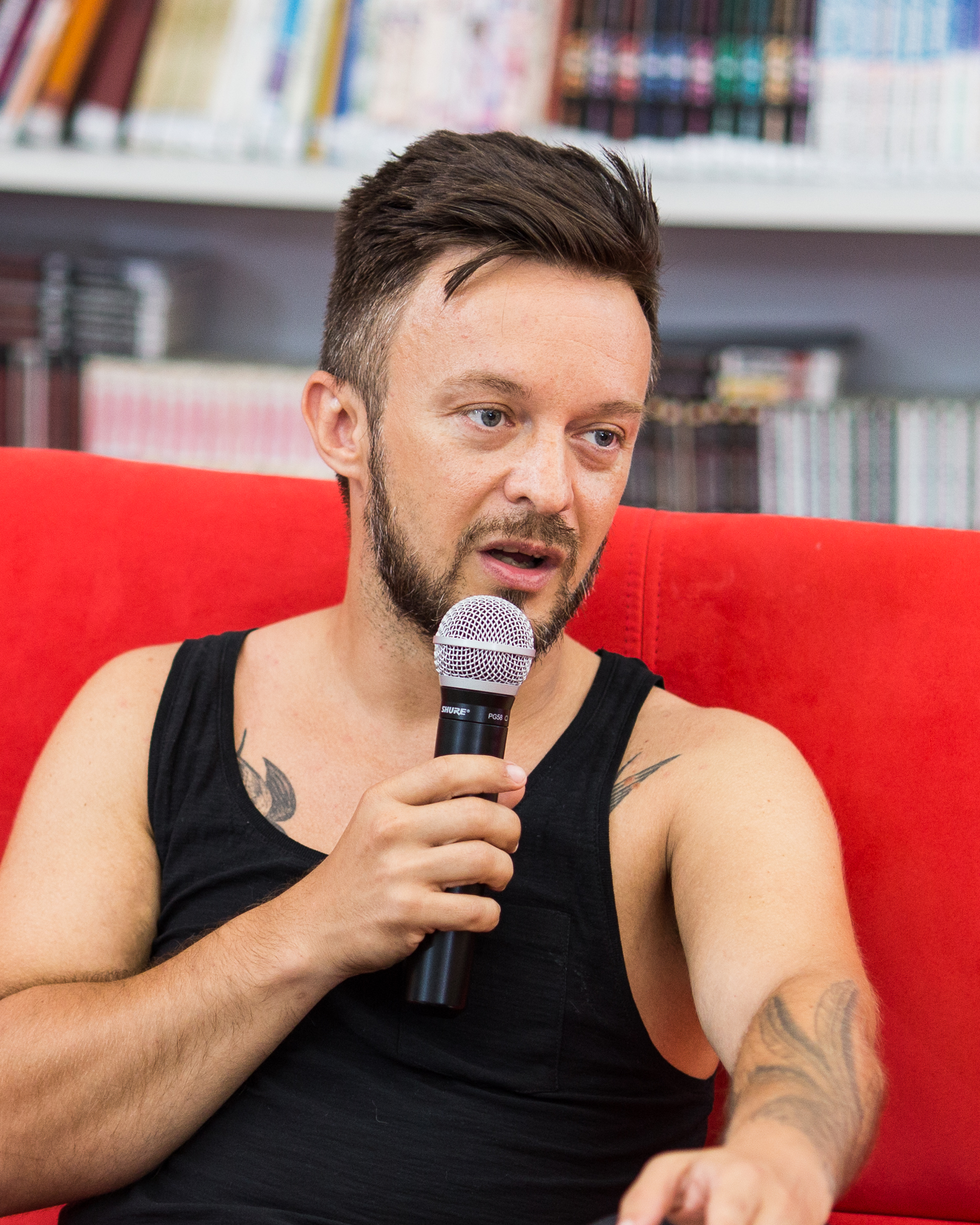
- Arie in 2016
- Born: Pavlo Valentynovych Alieksieiev; 16 October 1977 (age 48); Lviv, Ukrainian SSR, Soviet Union
- Education: Ukrainian Academy of Printing; Taras Shevchenko National University of Kyiv
- Occupations: Playwright; screenwriter; conceptual artist; translator
- Mother: Alexeeva Yaroslava Volodymyrivna
- Awards: see here

Pavlo Valentynovych Alieksieiev (Ukrainian: Павло Валентинович Алєксєєв; born 16 October 1977) is a Ukrainian playwright, screenwriter, conceptual artist and translator for Polish and German. He has written over a dozen scripts and plays. Additionally, his writings have been widely published in a variety of magazines and books, some of them have even been produced and seen at theatre festivals.

== Early life and education ==
Born on 16 October 1977, in the Ukrainian city of Lviv. Arie received his art diploma from the Ukrainian Academy of Printing in Lviv in 1998. He then pursued his studies in sociology at the Taras Shevchenko National University of Kyiv from 2000 to 2004. In an interview, he revealed that he had previously earned a certificate in the specialization of "economist," but that he had ultimately made the decision to try his hand at theater because "he does not want to work with business people."

Arie relocated to Cologne in 2004 to live and study, and he later earned his university degree there. In 2016, he moved back to Lviv to take up the role of creative director of the Lesia Ukrainka Drama Theatre.

== Career ==
Arie's play was originally presented by the professional theater on 24 January 2009. That was the time that Oleksiy Kravchuk's play based on the drama Кольори had its theatrical debut at the Lviv Municipal Theater. During the 2010 summer, the play Експеримент was selected for the prestigious New Performances from Europe European theatrical biennale in Wiesbaden, Germany. Between 2012 and 2013, he collaborated with the London Royal Court Theatre, contributing to the vibrant theatrical scene. Further acclaim followed in 2019, as he clinched the Best Screenplay Award at the Fantazmopoa International Film Festival in Brazil.

Demonstrating a commitment to fostering artistic talent, he was appointed curator of the drama program at the international Art Workshop and Festival Drabina in Ukraine from 2011 onwards, and subsequently curated the annual competition of modern Ukrainian drama, Drama.UA, from 2012 to 2016. Arie's leadership extended to serving as the artistic director and creative director of the Lesia Ukrainka Drama Theatre between 2016 and 2017, as well as curating the international program at the Heidelberg Stückemarkt theater festival in Germany during the same period.

Arie has been a jury member for dramatic and literary competitions, including The Coronation of the Word since 2018. Additionally, he became a member of the Ukrainian Film Academy in 2019 and assumed the role of chief playwright and director at the Kyiv Academic Theatre of Drama and Comedy on the left bank of Dnieper from 2019 to the present day. His influence extended internationally as they served on the jury of the International Festival of Ukrainian Theatre East-West from 2020 to 2022, held in Kraków.

== Works ==
=== Plays ===
- Десять засобів самогубства (2004)
- Революція, кохання, смерть і сновидіння (2005)
- Ікона (2006)
- Експеримент (2007)
- Кольори (2008)
- Людина в підвішеному стані (2010)
- ТУ ТІ ТУ ТУ ТУ (2011)
- Слава Героям (2012)
- На початку і наприкінці часів (2013)
- Вівця (2013)
- Десь на місяці (2013)

=== Theater director ===
- Лондон — by Maxim Dosko (Drama.UA), premiere at the Kyiv Academic Theatre of Drama and Comedy (2014)
- Том на фермі — by Michel Marc Bouchard, premiere at the Lesia Ukrainka Drama Theatre (2017)

== Personal life ==
Alexeeva Yaroslava Volodymyrivna is Arie's mother, a doctor; for two weeks in the summer of 1986, she spent work with a group of firemen close to the Chernobyl nuclear power plant. He said in an interview that he spoke Russian to his mother.

== Awards and recognitions ==
Arie has received awards and recognitions such as:

- Best Screenplay Award at the Fantazmopoa International Film Festival (2019)
- Member of the Ukrainian Film Academy (2019)
- Koronazia Slova Ukrainian Literature Prize (2011)
