= Vladimir Begma =

Russian contemporary artist (1941–2025)

- Владимир Бегма
- Born: 3 January 1941; Lvovka, Kalachinsky District, Omsk Oblast, Russian SFSR, USSR
- Died: 7 July 2025 (aged 84)
- Known for: Painting; illustrating

Vladimir Ivanovich Begma (Russian: Владимир Иванович Бегма, 3 January 1941 – 7 July 2025) was a Russian artist who worked primarily in painting and illustrating. He was an Honored Painter of the Russian Federation.

== Biography ==
Born in Lvovka, Kalachinsky District, Omsk Oblast. Begma studied at Grekov Rostov Art Technical College at the Painting faculty and graduated in 1964. Then he studied at Moscow Polygraphic Institute at the Print Art Design faculty and graduated in 1969. He was an apprentice of Andrei Goncharov and Volya Lyakhov (famous Soviet People's Artists). In 1975 he became a member of the USSR Union of Artists (now Russian Union of Artists).

Begma worked more than fifty years in visual arts and thirty-five years in pedagogy at art schools in Rostov. He was a mentor of Sergei Gavrilyachenko (People's Visual artist of the Russian Federation), N. Polyushenko (Honored artist of the Russian Federation), Alexey Adamov and some other famous Russian artists. His works were crucial to autolithography and animalistic art.

Begma died on 7 July 2025, at the age of 84.

== Art works ==
The series of his works received recognition: “Song to the Forest”, “Under the Don Sky”, “The Smell of Wormwood”, “Grass by the House”, “Hound Hunting”, illustrations for Mikhail Sholokhov’s novel “Quiet Flows the Don”, etc.

== Recognition ==
He was awarded the Silver medal of the Russian Academy of Arts (2008), diplomas of the USSR Union of Artists and the Russian Union of Artists (1980, 1985, 1987, 1999, 2004 and 2008) and other awards. In 2010 he was awarded the title of "Honored Painter of the Russian Federation".
