= Vitalina Bibliv =

Ukrainian actress (1980-)

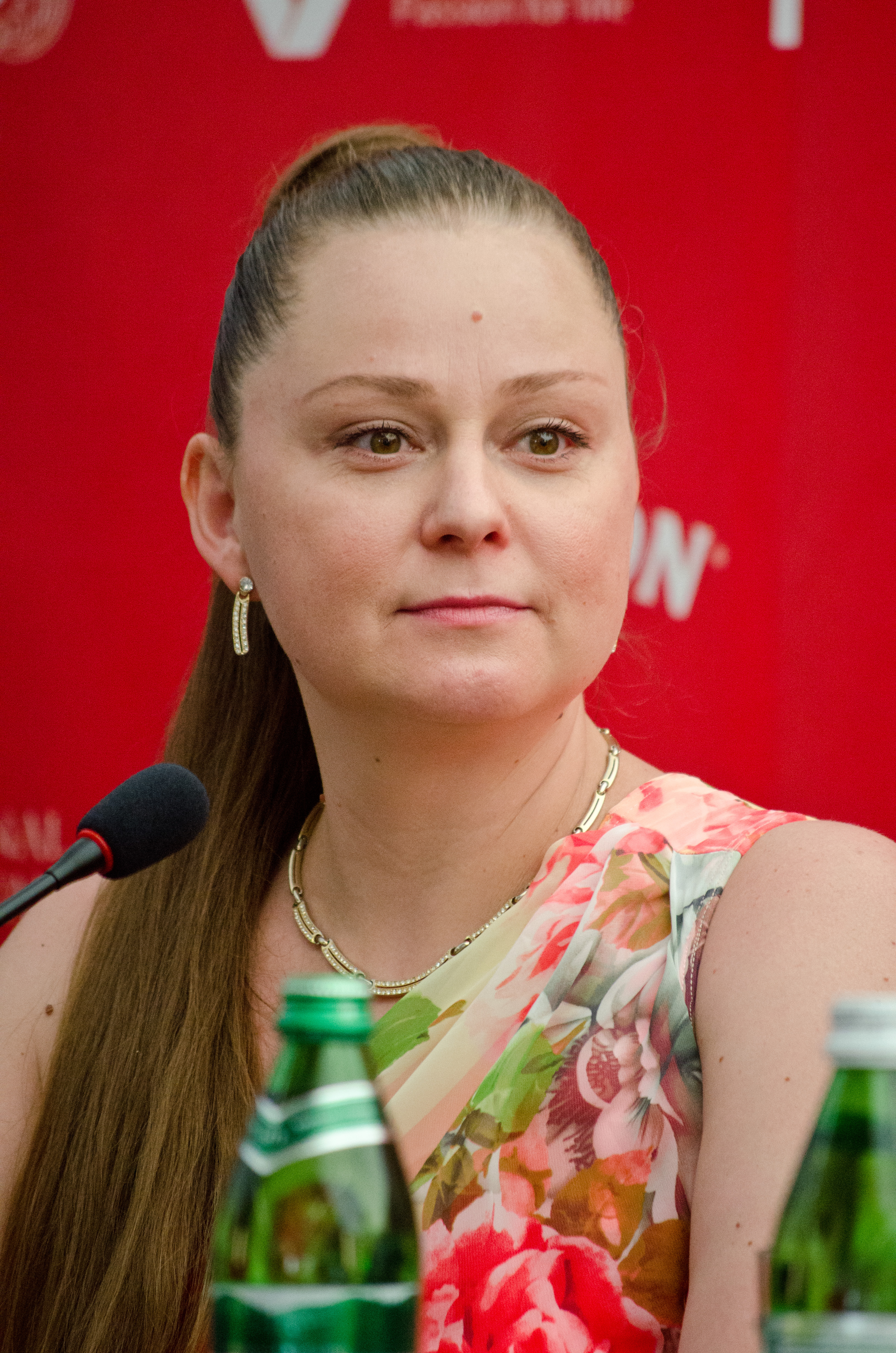
- Vitalina Bibliv at the 6th Odessa International Film Festival (2015)
- Born: Vitalina Nikolaevna Bibliv; October 15, 1980 (age 45); Vasylkiv, Ukraine

Vitalina Mykolaivna Bibliv (Ukrainian: Віталіна Миколаївна Біблів; born October 15, 1980, Vasylkiv, Kyiv region, Ukrainian SSR) is a Ukrainian theater, film and television actress. Winner of the Golden Yula National Prize (2019), Honored Artist of Ukraine (2020).

== Biography ==
Vitalina Bibliv was born on October 15, 1980, in the city of Vasilkov, Kyiv region.

The school teacher Inna Pushkareva helped with the choice of the acting profession. On Teacher's Day in the ninth grade, Vitalina was instructed to make a parody of Verka Serduchka. Although she doubted, the teacher believed in her charisma.

After school, Vitalina studied at the School of Culture. In an interview, she notes that from school she dreamed of being a clown and working in a circus. By that time, a variety and circus education could only be obtained at a school, and Vitalina sought to get a higher education. In 2003 she graduated from the Kyiv Theater Institute. Karpenko-Kary (workshop of Les Tanyuk).

In 2003-2004 she was an actress at the Kyiv Free Stage Theatre. From 2003 to 2008 she worked as an actress at the Kyiv theater "Atelier 16". Since 2008 - in the Kyiv Academic Theater "Golden Gate", while collaborating with the Kyiv Academic Young Theater, the production agency "TE-ART". In 2015, Vitalina Bibliv became a theatrical discovery, playing the role of Glory in the play "Stalkers" by Stas Zhirkov.

The debut in the cinema took place in 2004 - a small role in the TV series "Blind Love" by Nikolai Kaftan. Critics pay special attention to the film Song of Songs (2015 film) directed by Eva Neymann, where Vitalina played a Jewish mother. The tape was recognized as the best film in Europe (2012), the best film of the international and domestic competition of the 2015 Odesa International Film Festival.

In 2009, she was named one of the 20 best actresses in Ukraine.

She teaches at the Kyiv College of Culture and Arts, and lives and works in Kyiv.

Kyiv Academic Theater "Golden Gate"

Theater "Atelier 16"

== Theater ==
- The Threepenny Opera by B. Brecht — Peacham Series
- The Glass Menagerie by T. William - Laura
- "Horse's Egg" based on the play "Victor, or Children in Power" by Roger Vitraka - Teresa Mano
- "The one who fell from the sky", children's musical based on Ukrainian folk tales - Bukhanochka
- "The Importance of Being Earnest" O. Wilde - Miss Prism
- “Waiting for Godot (Waiting Men)” by S. Becket — Orchestra
- "Waiting for Godot (Women's Expectations)" S. Becket - Pozzo
- "Romeo and Juliet" by W. Shakespeare - Nurse
- "Suicide" M. Erdman - Serafima Ilyinichna
- 2015 - "Feeling behind the wall" by Anna Yablonskaya; dir. Stas Zhirkov
- 2015 - "Stalkers" by Pavel Arye; dir. Stas Zhirkov - Slavka (co-production of the Golden Gate Theater and the Kyiv Academic Young Theater)
- 2016 - "Glory to the Heroes" by P. Aryeh; dir. Stas Zhirkov
- 2016 - "Fancy toys on the roof" based on "light steps" by Veniamin Kaverin; dir. Dmitry Gusakov
- 2017 - "KostyaKatyaMamaTea" by Tamara Trunova; dir. Tetyana Gubriy - Katya's mother
- 2017 - "Colors" by Pavel Arye; dir. V. Belozorenko - Violet
- 2017 - "Dad, did you love me?" based on the play "The Quiet Rustle of Disappearing Steps" by Dmitry Bogoslavsky; dir. Stas Zhirkov
- 2018 - "Miss Julia" by August Strindberg; dir. Ivan Uryvsky - Freken Julia
- 2019 - "Take everything from life" by Ruslan Gorovoy and daddy Bo; dir. Tetyana Hubriy
- 2020 - "The family of the pathologist Lyudmila" Pavel Arye; dir. Elena Apchel
- 2021, March 13 - solo performance "The Squirrel Who Lived 100 Years" by Oleg Mikhailov; dir. Stas Zhirkov

=== Producer agency "TE-ART" ===
- 2016 - "Illusions" by Ivan Vyrypaev; dir. Stas Zhirkov
- 2017 — Chaos. Women on the Verge of a Nervous Breakdown” Mika Mylluaho; dir. Maxim Golenko
- 2020, October 31 "faithful wives" of the Olkhovskaya authorities; dir. Tetyana Hubriy

Other

- "Don Juan" by Molière; dir. Stanislav Moiseev - Matyurina (Kyiv Academic Young Theatre)
- 2015 - "The Cauldron" by Maria Starozhitskaya; dir. Evgeny Stepanenko (multimedia performance at the Kinopanorama cinema)
- 2017 - "How to spend a million that does not exist" based on the book "How to spend a million that does not exist and other stories of a Jewish boy" by Garik Korogodsky; dir. Tikhon Tikhomirov (entreprise, Kyiv)
- 2019 - "For family reasons" Ray Cooney; dir. Vyacheslav Zhyla (entreprise, Kyiv)
- 2019 - "Don Juan" modern mix by Marina Smilyanets; dir. Maxim Golenko (Kyiv Academic Theater "Actor")

== Filmography ==
- 2004 - Love is blind - Episode
- 2005 - Thanks for everything - Young midwife
- 2005 "The myth of the ideal man" Nastya
- 2005-2006 - Lesya + Roma (TV series) - episode
- 2006 - Return of Mukhtar-3 (85th series "Marquis and Garden") - nanny
- 2006 - Nine Lives of Nestor Makhno - episode
- 2006 - Grandfather of my dreams 2 - housekeeper
- 2006 - Madhouse - episode
- 2006 - Beware of blondes! - episode
- 2006 - Utiosov, song for life - nurse
- 2006-2007 - Guardian Angel (TV series) - Agatha, journalist
- 2007 - Harp for the Beloved - Methodist
- 2007 - The return of Mukhtar-4 (57th series "Beautiful finale") - Kozlova
- 2007 - Money for daughter - Valentina
- 2007 - Sign of Destiny - episode
- 2007 - Forgiveness Sunday - Lyudka
- 2007-2011 - In search of truth
- 2008 - My daughter
- 2008 - Red Lotus - Zhanna, Dmitry's wife
- 2008 - Blue as sea eyes - Timur's wife
- 2008 - Maid of the Three Masters - Natasha
- 2008 - Mysterious Island - Vachterka
- 2009 - Ice in the coffee grounds - actress
- 2009 - Shark - Valya, a nurse in a special reception
- 2009 - Prodigal children - Lyudmila Nikolaevna, teacher
- 2009 - The return of Mukhtar-5 (48th series "Money does not smell") - an employee of the currency exchange
- 2009 - Legends of witch love - episode
- 2009 - Melody for Katerina - engraving on the machine
- 2009 - Assholes. Arabesque
- 2009 - Windows - pharmacy clerk
- 2009 - Autumn Flowers - Wiring
- 2009 - According to the law - Ant (21st series "Death of the Jubilee") - Murashkin
- 2009 Abduction of the Goddess - Makeup
- 2009 - Matchmakers-2 (TV series) - florist
- 2009 - Life of Captain Chernyaev - episode (uncredited)
- 2009 - Without trial or investigation
- 2009 Dead End
- 2010 — Faith. Hope. Love - Valya, nurse
- 2010 - The war ended yesterday - Manka
- 2010 - Neighbors - Masha, daughter of Radmila
- 2010 - Smile when the stars cry
- 2010 - finished
- 2011 - Indian summer - milkmaid
- 2011 - The Ballad of the Bomber - episode
- 2011 - Grandfather - cashier
- 2011 - House with a tower - curly woman
- 2011 - Return of Mukhtar-7 (55th series "Under the Hat") - Olga Nikolaevna Murzintseva, Petrushkina's housekeeper
- 2011 - Donut Luca - country girl (uncredited)
- 2011 - Casanova's last case - Pavlova, lieutenant of the State Tax Service (uncredited)
- 2011 - Seven miles to the sky - Lida, dressmaker
- 2011 - Urgently looking for a man - an employee of the Central Address Bureau
- 2011 - I will never forget you - Valya, postman
- 2012 - Match - episode
- 2012 - Tales of Mityai - Anya Ptichnitsa
- 2012 - Island of useless people - Vicki, Lisa's friend
- 2012 - Ukraine, goodbye! Non-GMO (short)
- 2012 General's daughter-in-law - Klava
- 2012 - Jamaica - cook in the colony
- 2012 - The road to the void - Raisa Andreevna, savings
- 2012 - Female Doctor (TV series) - Vita Igorevna Polupanova, head nurse
- 2012 - Defender - Tamara, summer resident
- 2012 - Waiting list - Varya, nurse
- 2012 - I love because I love - Lucy, saleswoman
- 2012 - Lover for Lucy - Snow Maiden
- 2012 - Love with a weapon - Inna, psychologist
- 2012 - Dumb - Masha
- 2012 - Odesa-mother - Angela, Arnold's wife
- 2012 - Flight of the Butterfly - Maid
- 2012 - Gunpowder and Fraction (Film 6 "Gray Mouse") - Nurse
- 2012 - Rollfield
- 2013 - Passion for Chapai - episode
- 2013 - Double life - nurse
- 2013 - Steward - Belka, florist
- 2013 - Female doctor-2 (TV series) - Vita Igorevna Polupanova, senior midwife
- 2013 - Love with a trial period - Lisa, librarian
- 2013 - Butterflies (mini-series) - Nina, paramedic
- 2013 - Lonely Hearts - Irina
- 2013 - Divorce of neighbors - Tanechka
- 2013 - Vacation for living - Oksana, Ulyana's friend
- 2013 - Chief of Police - Zina
- 2013 - Schuler - Kurybko, leader
- 2013 - I will always wait for you - Dusy
- 2014 — Botman Seagull
- 2014 - Poddubny - sister of Ivan Poddubny
- 2014 - Brotherhood - Tanya, nurse
- 2014 - Everything will return - registry office worker
- 2014 - Let's kiss - stranger
- 2014 - Farewell, boys - Masha, Zaitsev's wife
- 2014 - Beach - Zoya, Pie Saleswoman
- 2014 - Sing in a moment - Olechka, nurse
- 2014 - While the village sleeps - Baba-1
- 2014 - Charlie - Nurse
- 2015 - Come back - Let's talk - cashier
- 2015 - Officers' wives - Glasha
- 2015 - Song of Songs - Shimek's mother
- 2015 - Servant of the people (TV series) - Mila, Skoryk's wife
- 2015 - This is love - toastmaster
- 2015 — Poor People
- 2016 - Welcome to the Canarian Service - Dear Nurse
- 2016 — Nikonov & Co — Larisa Novikova
- 2016 - Express business trip - Tanya
- 2016 - On the line of life - Yana, nurse
- 2016 — Pushers — Irina Marusheva
- 2016 - Presenter (TV series) - Valya, leading car restaurant
- 2016 - Central Hospital - Vera Nachalova, wife of Vladimir
- 2017 - Upside down
- 2017 - The second life of Eva - Tatyana
- 2017 - Female Doctor - 3 (TV series) - Vita Igorevna Polupanova, Kvitko's wife
- 2017 - Line of Light - Tamara
- 2017 - Dawn will come - Margarita Petrovna Stepanova (Queen Margot), matron
- 2017 - Servant of the people - 2. From love to impeachment (TV series) - Mila, Skorik's wife
- 2017 — Specialists — Council, Secretary
- 2017 — Know our
- 2017 - First night - Faina Zakharovna (short)
- 2018 - Two poles of love ("Two banks of the road") - Zinaida Kurbatova, Fedor's wife, mother of twins
- 2018 - Two mothers (TV series) - Galina Poltorak, mother of Zoya and Sergey
- 2018 — Zainka (short)
- 2018 - A year in debt! - episode
- 2018 - House for happiness - Lyuba
- 2018 - Gate - Glory, daughter of Baba Prisi
- 2019 - 11 children from Morshyn - cleaning lady in the shopping center
- 2019 - Someone else's life (TV series) - episode
- 2019 - Routes of Destiny
- 2019 - Cherkasy - mother Mouse
- 2019 - House for happiness - 2 - Lyuba
- 2019 - Female Doctor-4 (TV series) - Vita Igorevna Polupanova, Kvitko's wife
- 2019 — Meeting of classmates — Irka
- 2019 - Family for a year - Shirma Svetlana Yurievna, OPEC officer
- 2019 - Survive at any cost (TV series) - Galina Fedorovna, mother-in-law
- 2019 — Medfak
- 2020 - Papanki-2 - head of condominiums
- 2020 - Female doctor - 5 (TV series) - Vita Igorovna Polupanova, flower girl
- 2020 - Suffer a little
- 2021 - Dead Lilies - Galina
- 2021 - Amber Cops
- 2021 - Lusya Intern - Nina Rozhok
- 2021 - House of happiness. Bourbon Time - Luba
- 2021 - Doctor Hope
- 2022 - House for happiness - 3 - Lyuba
- 2022 - Bobrinsky House - Olga Nikolaevna Onufrieva
- 2022 — Hope

=== Dubbing and voice acting ===
- 1950 - Cinderella - Drisella
- 2015 - Thoughts inside out - Sadness
- 2015 - The Perfect Voice 2 - (Bella) Cow (Fat) Amy (Patricia) (played by Rebel Wilson)
- 2016 - Actively Seeking - Robin, co-writer of Alice (played by Rebel Wilson)
- 2019 - Desperate Rascals - Lonnie (performed by Rebel Wilson)
- 2019 - Cats - Geniashvendi (played by Rebel Wilson)
- 2020 - Sonic - Sonic the Hedgehog

== Awards and nominations ==
- 2016 - Nomination for the theater award "Kyiv Pectoral" in the nomination "Best production of a supporting actress" for her role in the play "Stalkers"
- 2019 - Victory in the IV Theater Award "Mirror of the Stage" (newspaper "Mirror of the Week. Ukraine") in the nomination "Acting Charisma" for her role in the play "Miss Julia", theater "Golden Gate"
- 2019 - National Film Award "Golden Dziga". Golden Dziga Award for Best Supporting Actress (the role of Slavka in The Gates)
- 2020 - Honored Artist of Ukraine.
