= Motanka doll =

Traditional Ukrainian doll

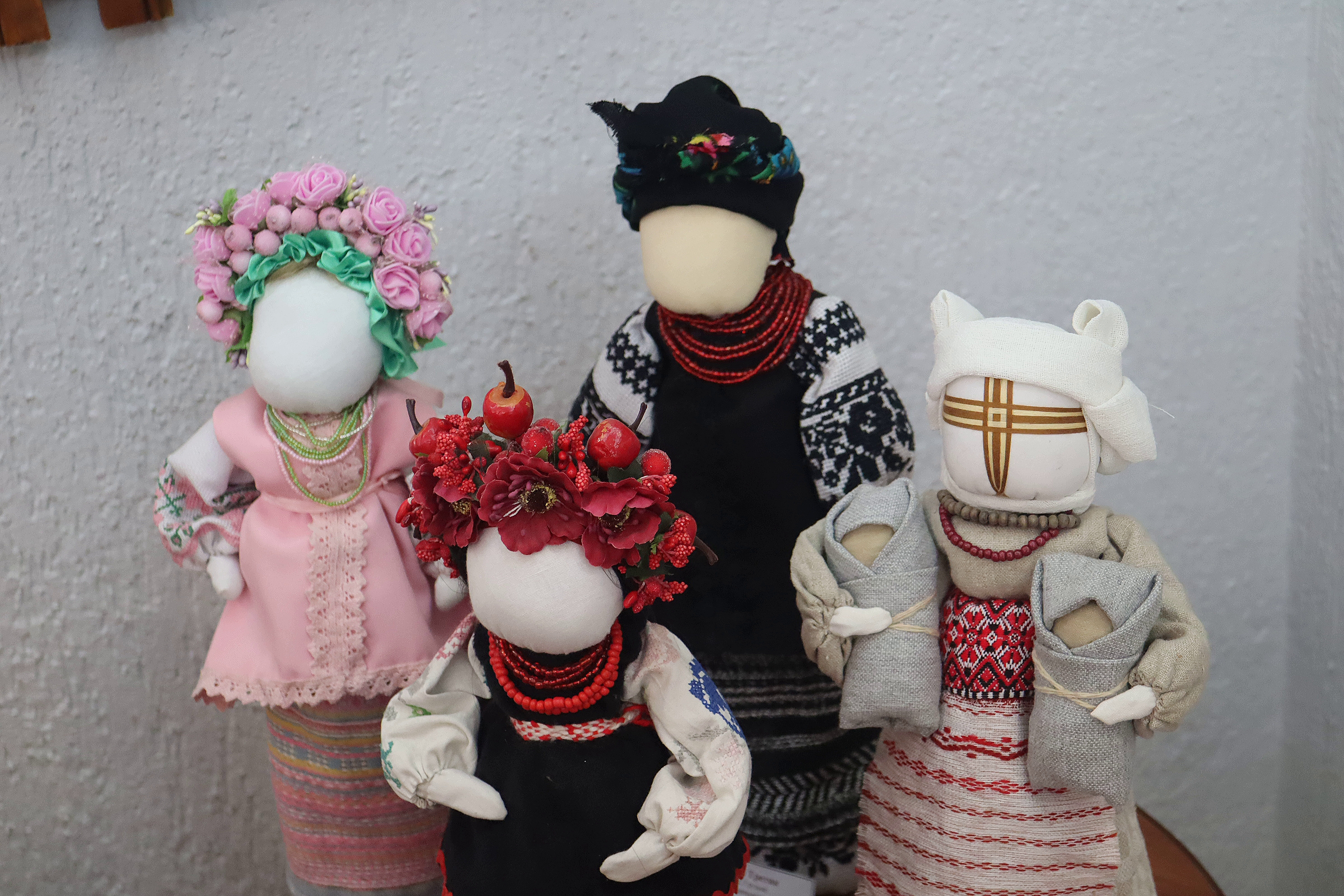
Motanka dolls

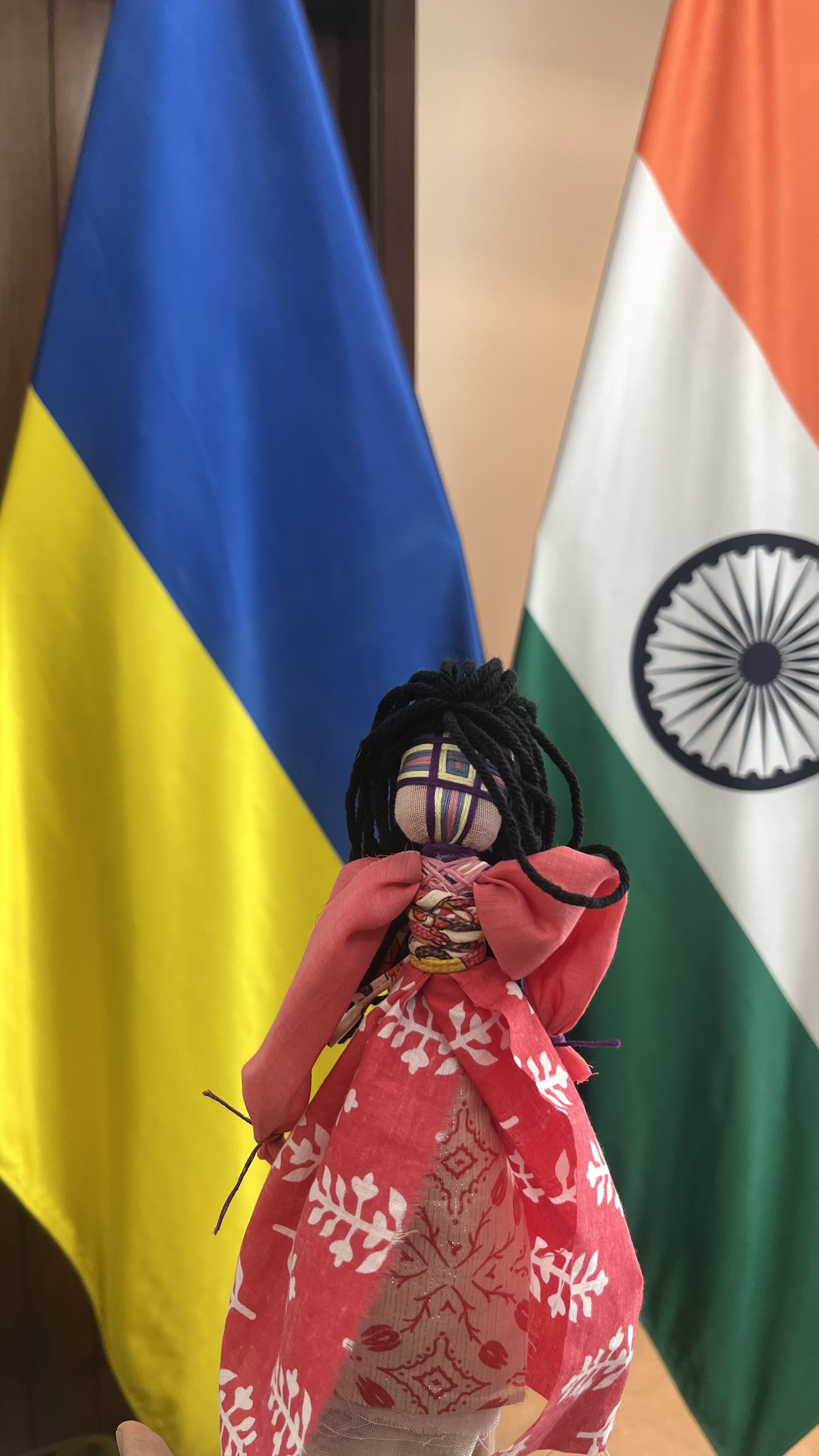
Motanka doll made at the Ukraine Embassy in India during Ukraine's Cultural Diplomacy Month 2026

A motanka doll (Ukrainian: мотанка) is a traditional East Slavic cloth doll associated with folk culture in Ukraine. It is typically handmade by winding and tying pieces of fabric without the use of needles or stitching and is often considered both a toy and a symbolic or ritual object.

== Etymology ==
The term motanka derives from the Slavic verb motaty (to wind or wrap), referring to the method of construction in which fabric and thread are wound around a core to form the figure.

== History ==
Some sources associate the origins of motanka dolls with prehistoric cultures of Eastern Europe, including the Cucuteni–Trypillia culture (c. 5500–2750 BCE), although direct continuity remains a subject of interpretation. Motanka dolls have traditionally been used both as children's toys and as symbolic or protective objects within households.

The dolls are typically constructed without the use of needles or other sharp tools; instead, fabric is wound and tied to form the figure, a method reflected in the name motanka, derived from the Slavic verb meaning "to wind" or "to wrap." This approach has been linked in folk belief to the avoidance of cutting or piercing, which was sometimes thought to negatively affect the object's symbolic function.

A characteristic feature of many motanka dolls is the absence of facial features. In some examples, the face is represented by a cross formed with thread or cloth. This cross has been variously interpreted in ethnographic sources as a symbolic motif, sometimes associated with cosmological or solar meanings. The lack of a face has also been linked in traditional beliefs to the idea that the doll could not embody or attract a human soul or harmful forces.

Historically, such dolls formed part of folk traditions and were used in domestic and ritual contexts. By the 19th century, they were commonly associated with ceremonies related to family life, including birth and marriage.
