= Anti-Hetman Uprising =

1918 uprising in Ukraine

- Part of the Ukrainian War of Independence
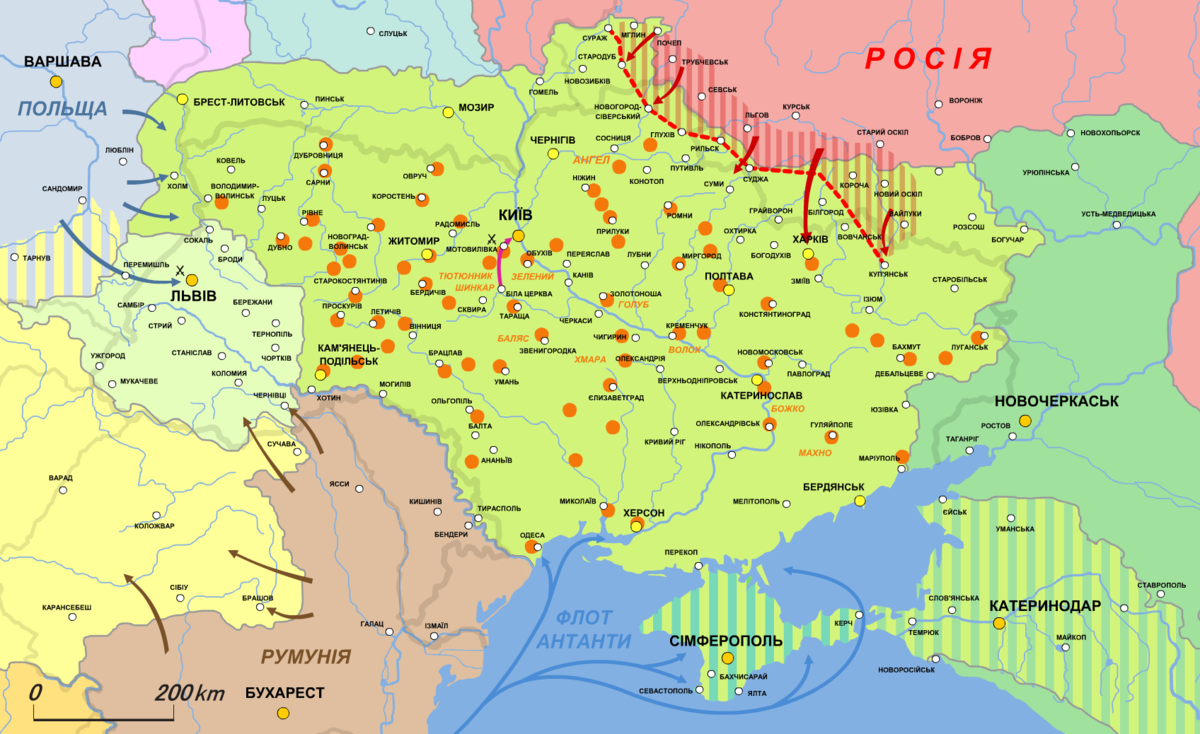
- Ukraine during the Anti-Hetman Uprising: Uprisings Demarcation line with the Russian SFSR; Dashed Negotiations with Crimea and Kuban for joining the Ukrainian State; Dashed Neutral zone between Russia and Ukraine prescribed by the Treaty of Brest-Litovsk
Date	14 November 1918 – 15 December 1918 (4 weeks and 1 day)
Location	Ukrainian State
Result	Directorate victory; Abdication of Pavlo Skoropadskyi; Restoration of the Ukrainian People's Republic

Belligerents
Directorate; Revolutionary Insurgent Army of Ukraine; Black Guards	Ukrainian State; White movement; Supported by: Imperial German Army (Note: Though the Weimar Republic was uninvolved in the conflict, German soldiers present in Ukraine following the end of World War I intervened to prevent the Directorate from taking Kyiv.)

Commanders and leaders
Volodymyr Vynnychenko; Symon Petliura; Yevhen Konovalets; Andriy Melnyk; Petro Bolbochan; Svyryd Kotsur; Volodymyr Oskilko; Nykyfor Hryhoriv; Danylo Terpylo; Fedir “Fed” Chernyk †; Mykola Zahaievych †; Nestor Makhno; Fedir Shchus	(Ukrainian State) Pavlo Skoropadskyi; (Ukrainian State) Kostiantyn Prisovskyi (surrendered); (Ukrainian State) Leonid Sviatopolk-Myrskyi (surrendered); (Russian Empire) Mikhail Drozdovsky; (Russian Empire) Fyodor Keller (executed)

Units involved
Sich Riflemen; Siege Corps of the Sich Riflemen; Greycoats; Separate Zaporizhzhia Division; Separate Black Sea Kish; Dnieper Division	(Ukrainian State) Serdiuk Division; (Ukrainian State) 3rd Kherson Corps; (Ukrainian State) 8th Katerynoslav Corps; Volunteer Army

Strength
60,000	5,000 (Serdiuk Guard Divisions)

The Anti-Hetman Uprising (Ukrainian: Антигетьманське повстання, romanized: Antyhetmanske povstannia or Протигетьманське повстання, Protyhetmanske povstannia) was a 1918 uprising and brief civil war against the government of the Ukrainian State, under Pavlo Skoropadskyi. Led by former Prime Minister Volodymyr Vynnychenko and Sich Riflemen commander Symon Petliura, the uprising brought together groups from throughout Ukraine in opposition to Skoropadskyi's proposed unification of Ukraine and Russia in an effort to garner support from the Allies of World War I.

== Background ==
Lieutenant general of the Ukrainian People's Army Pavlo Skoropadskyi launched a coup d'état on 29 April 1918, with the support of the country's landowners and farmers, as well as the German Empire. The Central Rada that preceded Skoropadskyi's government was regarded in German and conservative circles as ineffective and dysfunctional, owing to its small security forces, insistence on radical land reforms, and poor economic conditions. In the days prior to the coup d'état, Germany–Ukraine relations had been seriously damaged by conflicts between the Central Rada and German occupational authorities over legal matters. The Ukrainian People's Republic was abolished and replaced by the Ukrainian State, with Skoropadskyi as hetman.

Skoropadskyi's government, while initially popular, found itself unable to resolve matters of land reform. Skoropadskyi's conservative efforts also proved unpopular with the Ukrainian peasantry, who were largely landless. By the spring of 1918, an insurgency had begun, led by former members of the Central Rada. Additionally, German and Austro-Hungarian forces occupying Ukraine had lost much of the popularity they had in 1918, a result of frequent violent acts committed by occupational troops.

After the defeat of Germany and Austria-Hungary in World War I, Skoropadskyi's government was isolated, with the Allied Powers intent on supporting the restoration of the Russian Republic within its borders prior to the outbreak of the Russian Civil War. In an effort to appease the Allies and open the door for further support, Skoropadskyi signed the Federal Charter, which stipulated that Ukraine would be part of Russia as an autonomous unit.

The response within Ukraine was overwhelmingly negative, including among Skoropadskyi's supporters. As a result of the Federal Charter's signing, the Directorate of Ukraine, an underground group led by former Prime Minister Volodymyr Vynnychenko, launched an uprising with the intent of restoring the Ukrainian People's Republic. This was followed on 15 November 1918 by the distribution of anti-Hetmanate leaflets throughout Kyiv, Ukraine's capital.

== Events ==
On 16 November 1918, the uprising began with a rebellion of the Sich Riflemen in the city of Bila Tserkva. The city's police force was disarmed, and the Sich Riflemen, led by Symon Petliura, took over the city. From there, Directorate forces battled with Hetmanate troops at the Battle of Motovilivka, which would result in a decisive Directorate victory on 18 November and the capture of Vasylkiv. Petro Yeroshevych also defected from the government to the Directorate, bringing Podolia Governorate under the Directorate's control.

In response to the uprising, Skoropadskyi declared martial law, and mobilised all troops to quell the rebellion. However, Hetmanate forces were troubled by mass defections to the Directorate, particularly within the Podolia Governorate. The Podolia Corps' arsenal was used to arm pro-Directorate insurgents, as well as providing air support to the Directorate's soldiers. The Directorate also suffered from problems of its own in terms of reigning in insurgent commanders, many of whom were effectively independent from the Directorate. These commanders (namely Nykyfor Hryhoriv, and Danylo Terpylo, and Volodymyr Oskilko) were effectively warlords, operating in a fashion known as "Otamanshchyna".

Throughout November, the Directorate took control of most of Ukraine, leading to an attempt to capture Kyiv in December. After Directorate forces were decisively defeated by remaining German forces, it was instead determined to lay siege to Kyiv until the city fell. The Siege Corps of the Sich Riflemen, under the command of Yevhen Konovalets, eventually took the city after two weeks and an uprising by Directorate forces. Seeing that his government was collapsing, Skoropadskyi chose to abdicate, fleeing to Germany. The remaining government surrendered to the Directorate the next day.

== Aftermath ==
On 26 December 1918, the restoration of the Ukrainian People's Republic was formally declared. However, rather than restoring the Central Rada, the Directorate instead established the Labour Congress of Ukraine, a body consisting of members appointed by the Ukrainian government from various occupations. Shortly after the Anti-Hetman Uprising, a preliminary peace agreement between the Soviet and Ukrainian governments was signed, but it failed to stop conflicts between the two sides. Eventually, the remaining tensions culminated in the resumption of the Ukrainian–Soviet War with the 1919 Soviet invasion of Ukraine.

The Anti-Hetman Uprising kickstarted the military careers of several Ukrainian figures, such as Hryhoriv (later known for his uprising against the Bolsheviks), Terpylo (known for his leadership of the Green armies), and Konovalets (future founder of the Organisation of Ukrainian Nationalists). Andriy Melnyk was also a member of the Sich Riflemen during the uprising, and among those who determined to launch the uprising in Bila Tserkva rather than in Kyiv.

== Response ==
The uprising was subject to intense criticism from Ukrainian left-wing nationalist figures. Mykhailo Hrushevsky, Ukrainian head of state prior to Skoropadskyi's coup d'état, allegedly described it as the "darkest moment of the Ukrainian revolution." The left wing of the Ukrainian Socialist-Revolutionary Party also condemned the uprising as "counter-revolutionary." The Ukrainian populace reacted with ambivalence, by this point exhausted after a year of political turmoil, though Petliura faced criticism in non-partisan press organs. The remaining German soldiers in Kyiv, seeking to evacuate after the collapse of the German Empire, were primarily concerned with the continued operation of the Korosten railway station, which would allow them to return to Germany.

Conversely, in Bolshevik circles, the uprising was met with support. Prior to the uprising's beginning, Bolsheviks Christian Rakovsky and Dmitry Manuilsky met with the Directorate's leaders, where they agreed to support the Directorate through ceasefire violations and recognition of the Ukrainian People's Republic in return for the legalisation of the Communist Party of Ukraine. These agreements were a tactical move by the Bolsheviks, as part of a broader campaign to weaken Ukrainian nationalists and strengthen the position of communist insurgent groups. Other left-wing groups from throughout the Russian Empire, including the Left Socialist-Revolutionaries and anarchists, also supported the uprising.

== In culture ==
Events of Mikhail Bulgakov's semi-autobiographical novel The White Guard take place in Kyiv during the uprising against Skoropadsky's rule, when the city was contested between Germans, the White Guard and Ukrainian forces.
