= Dnieper Flotilla =

Various naval flotillas on the European Dnieper River

The Dnieper Flotilla (Russian: Днепровская военная флотилия, Ukrainian: Дніпровська військова флотилія) is the name given to the various naval flotillas on the Dnieper River. These were particularly active in four conflicts: the Russo-Turkish wars of 1735–39 and 1787–92, the Russian Civil War, and World War II (called, in Russia, the Great Patriotic War).

== The Dnieper Flotilla in the Russian Empire ==
=== Russo-Turkish War (1735–39) ===
Small naval vessels were built in Bryansk on the Desna River (a tributary of the Dnieper) from 1724.

At the start of the Russo-Turkish war in 1735, the Dnieper Army of Field Marshal B. K. Minich requested naval assistance in capturing the Turkish fortress of Ochakiv on the Black Sea. At the instigation of Vice-Chancellor Count Osterman, the Governing Senate issued a decree on January 4, 1737, for the building at Bryansk of a flotilla for operations on the Dnieper River. At least ten British officers served with the flotilla

For the construction and manning of the flotilla, 4650 sailors, soldiers, and craftsmen were sent to Bryansk. The boats constructed were mainly dubel boats, a type of shallow draft Russian 18th century rowing/sailing galley, of which 400 were ordered. According to some sources, though, most of the boats in the flotilla were Cossack boats which – according to a report made in 1738 by Rear Admiral Yakov Barch – were narrow, unstable, hard to row, suitable perhaps for Cossack journeys but very unfit for naval operations.

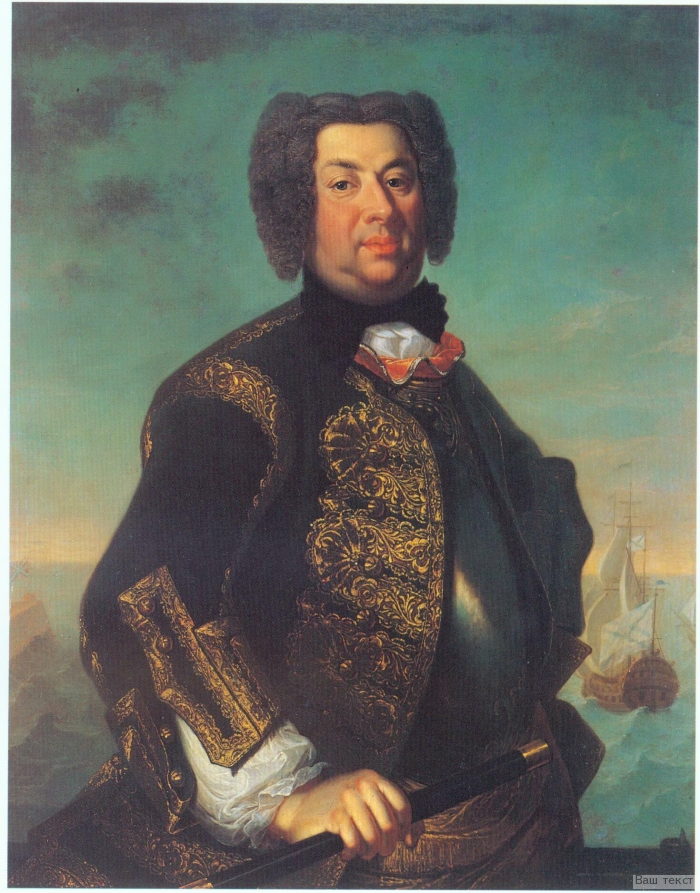
Vasily Dmítriev-Mamónov, first commander of the flotilla

On February 3, 1737, by order of Empress Anna, Rear Admiral Vasily Dmitriev-Mamonov took command of the flotilla.

In the spring of 1737 a flotilla consisting of 355 vessels with troops, supplies, siege artillery, and ammunition on board was sent down from Bryansk on the Desna to the Dnieper. Due to shallow water on the Dnieper that summer, most of the ships could not pass to the target destination (Ochakiv), and the first boats past the rapids arrived there only on July 17, when the fortress had already been taken by Russian troops.

On September 3, 1737, at the insistence of Field Marshall Minich, command of the flotilla was given over to Vice-Admiral Naum Senyavin. Under Senyavin's leadership, construction work in Bryansk intensified.

By October 1, 1737, there were only 18 boats remaining in the flotilla. On October 30, 40,000 Turkish troops supported by 12 galleys attacked Ochakiv; the Dnieper Flotilla played an active role in repelling the attack. Ochakiv remained besieged for two weeks, and naval combat continued in the area through October, during which time the flotilla was reinforced by another 30 small vessels. Although the Turks abandoned their attempt to retake Ochakiv, Russian access to the Black Sea remained blocked by the strong Turkish squadron.

In the spring of 1738 plague broke out among the troops, claiming Vice Admiral Senyavin, who was replaced as flotilla leader by recalling Rear Admiral Dmítriev-Mamónov. Under threat of the plague, the Russians – both land troops and Dnieper Flotilla – abandoned Ochakiv (as well as Kinburn Fortress on the tip of the Kinburn Peninsula at the extreme end of the Dnieper estuary). Dmítriev-Mamónov in turn succumbed to the plague and was replaced by Rear Admiral Yakov Barch. The war ended with the Treaty of Niš on October 3, 1739, and the Dnieper Flotilla – by then numbering 647 boats – was disbanded by 1741; most of the vessels were burned.

=== Russo-Turkish War (1787–92) ===
Nassau-Siegen

The Dnieper Flotilla in the Russo-Turkish War of 1787–92 was commanded by Karl Heinrich von Nassau-Siegen. With 51 boats of various types – dubel boats, cossack boats, and others – the flotilla combined with a squadron of 13 seagoing warships of the Black Sea Fleet commanded by John Paul Jones for operations in the Liman (the Dnieper-Bug Estuary), part of the Siege of Ochakiv of 1788. The Turkish fleet was roughly equal in large ships, but somewhat inferior in smaller craft to the Dnieper Flotilla.

Nassau-Siegen failed in everything he undertook.

— Samuel Eliot Morison, John Paul Jones

The command structure in the Liman was difficult, as neither Jones nor Nassau-Siegen had operational control, each reporting to Potemkin, who, being in charge of all armed forces of the empire, was not in a position to exercise tactical command. In addition, Jones thought poorly of Nassau-Siegen's abilities – an opinion shared by Jones's biographer, Samuel Eliot Morison – and Nassau-Siegen was jealous of Jones's more luxurious flagship.

At the First Battle of the Liman on the morning of June 7, 1788, the Turkish Fleet attacked the combined Russian fleet; Jones's big guns destroyed two Turkish vessels and the Turks retreated, but Nassau-Siegen did not pursue. He wrote to Potemkin "...unhappily, the wind was contrary, so our ships could not attack and had to retreat under the guns of the sailing squadron". Potemkin found this disingenuous, wondering why Nassau-Siegen's rowing boats could not go against the wind, especially considering that he had the current at his back. (Nevertheless, Nassau-Siegen – better at politics than fighting – was able to outmaneuver Jones politically, and eventually Jones was dismissed while Nassau-Siegen stayed.)

The next major battle, on June 16 and 17, saw Nassau-Siegen distracted with claiming prizes while Jones entreated him to help repel a Turkish attack; unsuccessful with Nassau-Siegen, Jones nevertheless persuaded some of the flotilla's individual captains to rally to him. This battle ended with a grisly episode which saw the Dnieper Flotilla attack several grounded Turkish vessels with flaming missiles, immolating alive the Turkish rowers – slaves and prisoners who were chained to their stations.

Osten-Sacken, at bay, ignites the magazine

Ultimately, the Siege of Ochakiv was successful and the Russians gained a permanent powerful presence on the Black Sea.

In a legendary incident, a dubel boat of the Dnieper Flotilla commanded by Captain Second Class Christian Ivanovich Osten-Sacken, scouting for the Black Sea Fleet, was surrounded and outnumbered by Turkish vessels. As the Turks attempted to board, Osten-Sacken blew up his boat, destroying it and four Turkish vessels. The explosion warned the Russians at Ochakiv that the Turkish fleet was approaching.

=== Dubel boats ===
Dubel boat

A main component of the Dnieper Flotilla in both the 1735–1739 and 1787–92 Turkish wars was the dubel boat (Дубель-шлюпка, with variant names also used). The dubel boat is a type of boat, unique to Russia, and extant from the 1730s to the 1790s, when they were replaced by gunboats. Their name may come from the English "double" in the sense of "duplicate", on the grounds that the boats appeared to be smaller versions of larger ships.

Chief Quartermaster R. Broun designed the boats and made the first model (still existing, at the Central Naval Museum). The dubel boat was a shallow draft rowing and sailing galley with 18 pairs of oars and two masts rigged with lateen sails. They were designed to be able to pass the Dnieper rapids and also serve as bridge pontoons to move armies across the Dnieper or other rivers. The boats were armed with six two-pounder falcon guns mounted on swivels. They were capable of transporting 50 soldiers and two small battalion guns.

Three dubel boats also accompanied Vitus Bering on the Great Northern Expedition (1733–1743).

== The Dnieper Flotilla in the Russian Civil War ==
The Dnieper Flotilla of the Ukrainian Front was formed in Kiev on March 12, 1919, by order of the Revolutionary Military Council of the Ukrainian Front (a Soviet Army Group formed during the Russian Civil War for offensive operations into Ukraine) and its commander Vladimir Antonov-Ovseyenko.

In May 1919, the flotilla was subordinated to the Office of Military Communications of the Ukrainian Front. On June 1, 1919, the All-Russian Central Executive Committee decided to disband the Ukrainian Front, which occurred on June 15, after which the Dnieper Flotilla was attached to the Soviet 12th Army. On August 27, 1919, control of the flotilla was transferred to the Commander of Naval Forces of the Russian Soviet Federative Socialist Republic.

As of March 21, 1919, the Dnieper Flotilla was organized into a headquarters and the following squadrons:

- 1st Squadron – the Charlotte, and Armored Boat Number 1 through Armored Boat Number 5
- 2nd Squadron – the Courier, the Apollo, and the Samuel
- 3rd Squadron – the Arnold, the Faithful, and the flotilla flagship, the Admiral

By late March the flotilla consisted of 19 combat and support vessels.

Armored boat Number 2 of the Dnieper Flotilla, armed with a machine gun in a turret

The flotilla's combat vessels were of two kinds: gunboats and armored boats. The gunboats were usually conversions of boats confiscated from Kiev shipowners, on which were installed one or two guns of 37–152 millimetres (1.5–6.0 in) calibre (fore and aft, if two guns) and up to six machine guns – Hotchkiss, Maxim, or whatever was available – with some iron or steel sheet bolted on for protection if any was available. The armored boats were purpose-built patrol craft inherited from the Imperial Navy; their armament consisted of one Maxim machine gun in a rotating turret, with a crew of 7.

The flotilla commander from March 12, 1919, to September 13, 1919, was A. V. Polupanov.

Beginning in April 1919 the Dnieper Flotilla supported about 21,000 Soviet troops engaged in a campaign against anti-Soviet forces under the turncoat rebel Daniil Ilich Terpilo (known as Ataman Zelyony (Зелёный, literally "Green")). The flotilla ultimately engaged in six campaigns against Zelyony.

On April 11, 1919, the rebels stormed Soviet-occupied Kiev. 400 of Zelyony's men attacked the Kiev docks from the steamer Baron Ginzburg. Later the rebels seized the Dnieper, Salubrious, Gogol, Charlotte, and Zeus from the Dnieper Flotilla. Zelyony moved his headquarters to the Charlotte.

Zelyony's insurgent army, calling itself Army of the Independent Soviet Ukraine, was thus able to block navigation of the Dnieper. But on May 1 and 2 of 1919 shelling by the Dnieper Flotilla destroyed much of the villages of Trypillia and Plyuty; on May 30 Trypillia was again shelled by the armed tugboat Taras Bulba and the armed steamer Courier. During fierce fighting near Trypillia in June and July 1919 Zelyony's captured boats were beaten back.

The Trypillia Incident, where Zelyony's men massacred a Komsomol special forces detachment, occurred on July 3, 1919. By the end of July, Zelyony's army was defeated (although not destroyed) and forced to retreat from Trypillia. Crucial to this was an operation by the Dnieper Flotilla which landed troops in the rear of the rebel army and rendered their position in Trypillia untenable.

On September 26, 1919, the boats of the Pripyat River Flotilla were added to the Dnieper Flotilla. In the Battle of Chernobyl of the Polish–Soviet War, on April 25–27, 1920, the Dnieper Flotilla was defeated by the Riverine Flotilla of the Polish Navy.

The Dnieper Flotilla was disbanded in December 1920.

== The Dnieper Flotilla during the Second World War ==
A Dnieper Flotilla was constituted in June 1931, but disbanded in June 1940, its vessels distributed to the newly formed Danube Flotilla (since, with the Soviet occupation of Bessarabia and Northern Bukovina the Soviets now had a border on the Danube) and the Pinsk Flotilla. The Danube river was seized by the German and Romanian forces early in the 1941 invasion of the Soviet Union, and the Danube Flotilla was disbanded on November 21, 1941.

Later in the war, with the advance of the Red Army back to the Dnieper River, a new Dnieper Flotilla was constituted from ships of the Volga Flotilla, in September 1943.

By the beginning of the Spring 1944 offensive the Dnieper flotilla consisted of about 140 boats and ships, including:

- 16 armored gunboats
- 10 patrol boats
- 40 river minesweepers
- 32 motorboats
- 1 floating artillery battery
- 2 anti-aircraft units

The commander of the Dnieper flotilla from October 1943 until the end of the war was Rear Admiral Vissarion Grigoriev. The flotilla's chief political commissar from April 1944 until the end of the war was P. B. Boyarchenkov. Flotilla chiefs of staff were J. V. Nebolsin in October and November 1943, and K. M. Balakirev from November 1943 to the end of the war.

The Dnieper Flotilla operated on the Dnieper River and its tributaries, the Berezina River and the Pripyat River, and also on the Vistula River and its tributary the Western Bug, and on the Oder River and the Spree River (which flows through the heart of Berlin). The Dnieper and its tributaries drain into the Black Sea, while the Bug, Vistula, Oder, and Spree drain into the Baltic Sea; the Flotilla was able to cross between watersheds using then-existing canals. (Late-war operations in the Black Sea watershed were left to the Danube Flotilla).

The Dnieper Flotilla's vessels contributed to the flank defense of advancing Soviet troops in Ukraine, Belarus, and Poland, and enabled the crossing of water obstacles, provided logistic support, and performed amphibious landings – the largest being the Pinsk Landing during the liberation of that city, with others including landings at Zdudichi, Petrikovsky, Borkinsky, and Doroshevichinsky. Flotilla units continued fighting to the end of the war, in battles on the Oder and Spree, and PG-117 motorboats of the Dnieper Flotilla participated in the storming of Berlin, the only naval units to do so.

In the summer of 1945 Armored Gunboat Number 302 was transferred to the far east, where it became part of the Amur Flotilla and fought in the 1945 war against Japan.

After the end of the war the Dnieper Flotilla was disbanded.

=== Types ===
Many different types of vessels served with the Dnieper Flotilla.

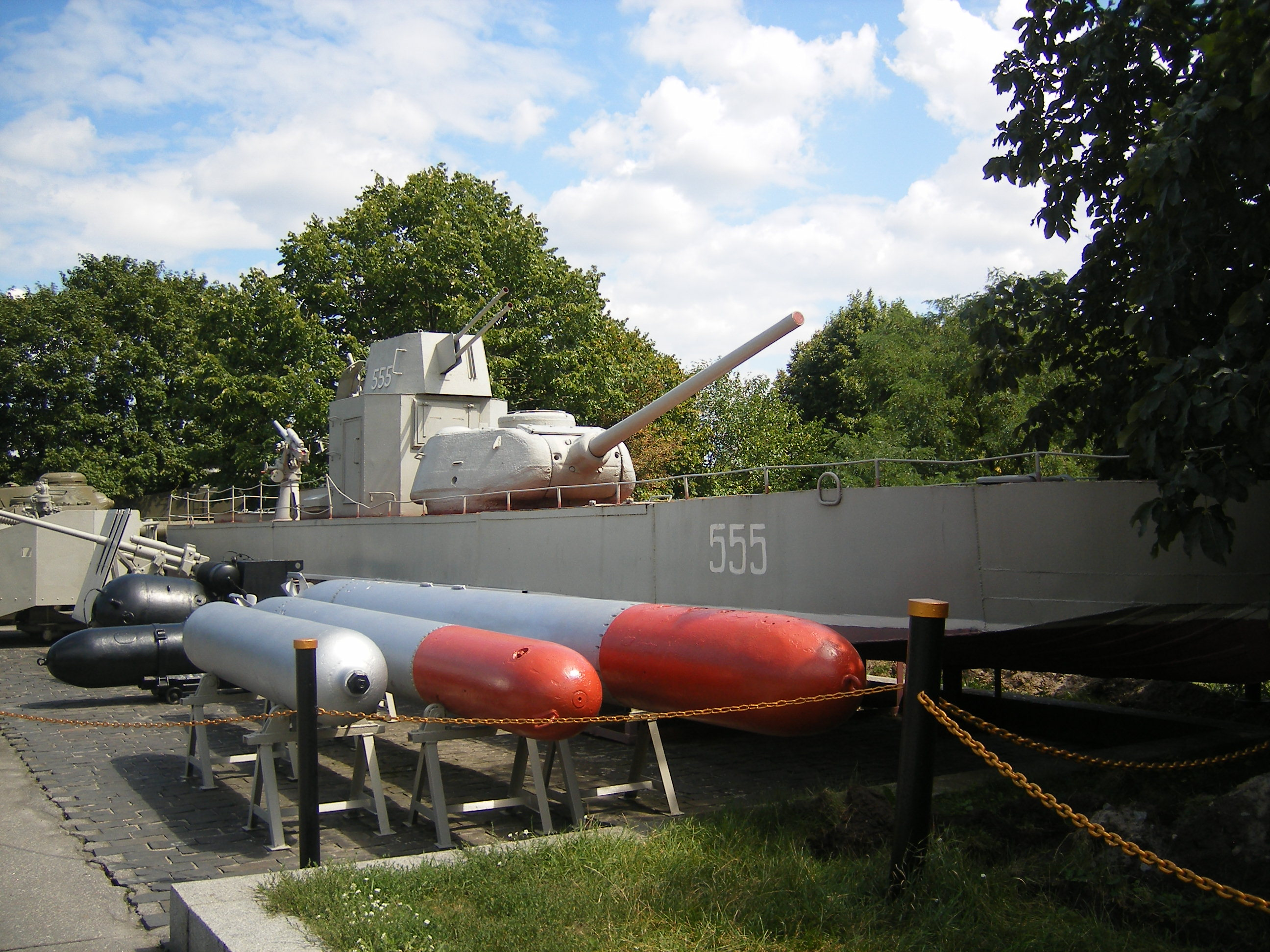
BK type made into a monument in Kiev, showing the tank turret main armament

One common type was the BK armored gunboats. This type served in large numbers with the Dnieper Flotilla as well as other Soviet river flotillas. At the time of the German invasion 85 of these were in commission, 68 were under construction, and a further 110 were ordered on August 18, 1941, all of which were completed during the war, and about 90 of which were lost. These boats carried a tank gun in a tank turret as their main armament – early units using T-28 and T-35 turrets, later units using T-34 turrets when these became available in 1939, all fitted with a 76.2 millimetres (3.00 in) gun. Model BK-1124 had two turrets and BK-1125 one turret. 22.6 metres (74 ft) long and 3.5 metres (11 ft) wide, they displaced 26.3 tonnes (29.0 short tons). They carried a crew of 10 and had a single gasoline engine generating 720 boiler horsepower for a speed of 37 kilometres per hour (23 mph). Besides the 3-inch main armament, the boats carried a 12.7mm machine gun and two 7.6mm machine guns.

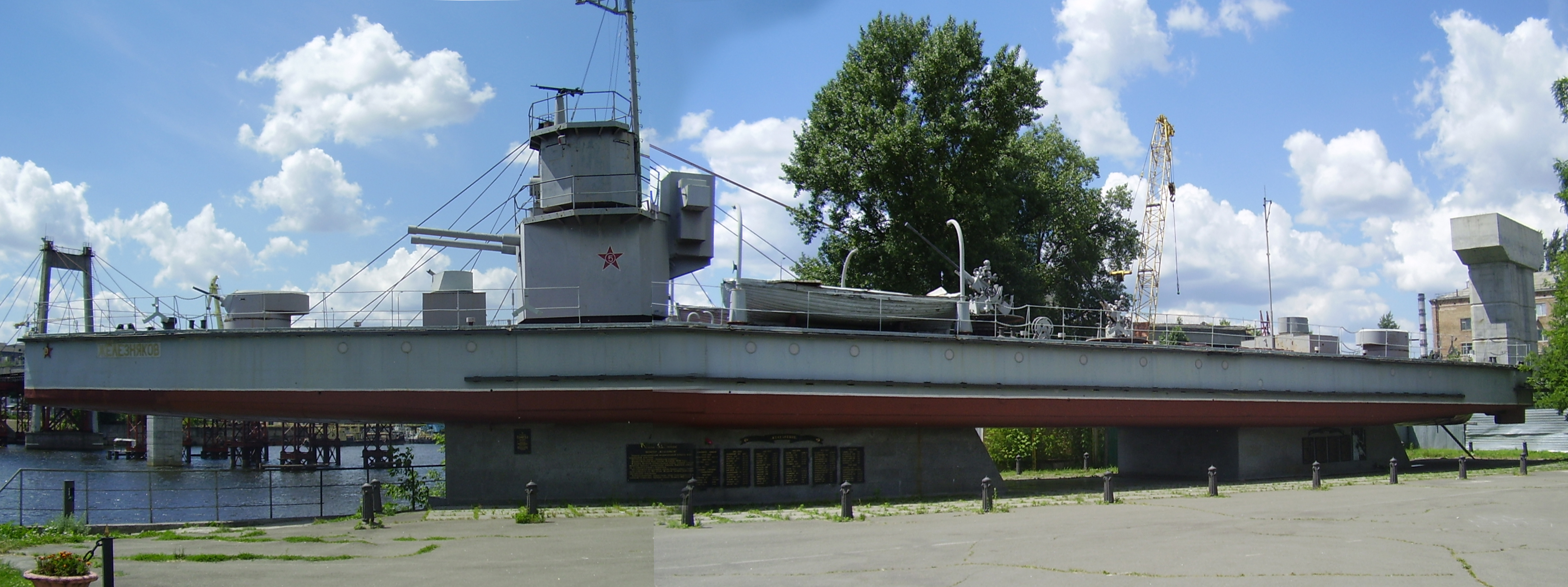
Zheleznyakov at Sailor's Park in Kiev

A much larger, slower, and less numerous but somewhat more powerful craft was the Zheleznyakov-class river monitor. Five of these were built at Kiev between 1934 and 1939 and all served in the Dnieper Flotilla. All were lost except the class leader, which is preserved at Kiev. These boats were 48 metres (157 ft) long and 7.6 metres (25 ft) wide with a displacement of 238.6 tonnes (263.0 short tons). They carried a crew of 70, had twin diesel engines generating 300 boiler horsepower for a speed of 14.1 kilometres per hour (8.8 mph), and were armed with a twin 4-inch (100 mm) main armament, two twin 44-millimetre (1.7 in) guns, and four machine guns.

=== Awards and monuments ===
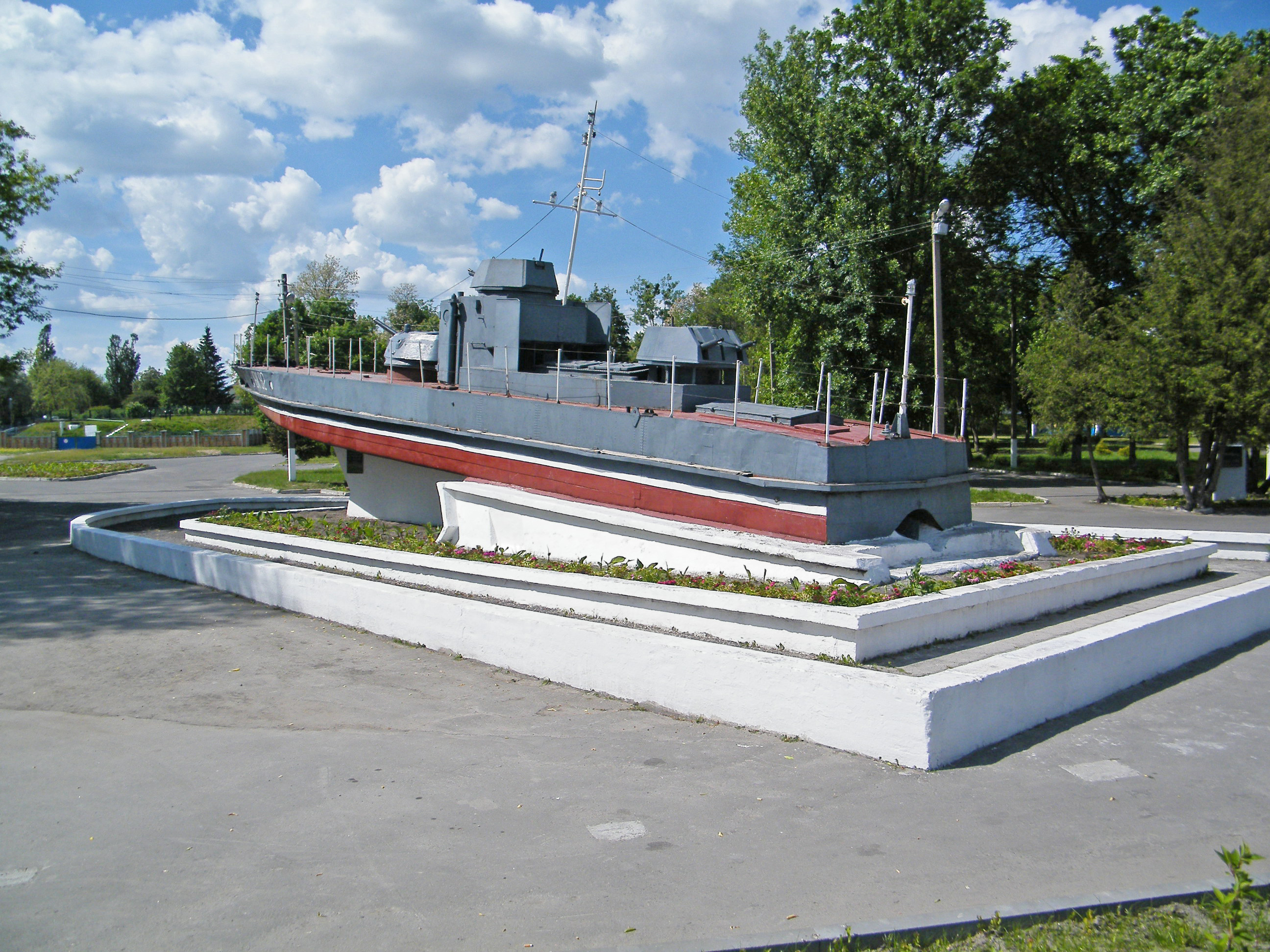
Monument in Pinsk to the Pinsk Landing

The Dnieper Flotilla was awarded the Order of the Red Banner in 1944 and, as a unit citation, the Order of Ushakov First Class in 1945. Some subunits of the flotilla were also awarded the Order of the Red Banner or were awarded Guards status or given honorary titles memorializing battles (Pinsk, Bobruisk, Luninets, Berlin). Three thousand soldiers and sailors of the flotilla were awarded orders and medals of the state, twenty of these being Hero of the Soviet Union, including one awarded to Alexander Firsov.

In Pinsk a memorial to the flotilla (a BK boat) was erected and a museum was created (closed in the early 1990s). A street in Pinsk was named Dnieper Flotilla Street. BK boats have also been installed as memorials in Kiev, in Mariupol in Ukraine, in Blagoveshchensk in Russia, and in Khabarovsk in the far east where Armored Gunboat Number 302 from the Dnieper Flotilla is preserved as a sailor's memorial on Pacific Street.

== The Dnieper Flotilla during the Russo-Ukrainian War ==
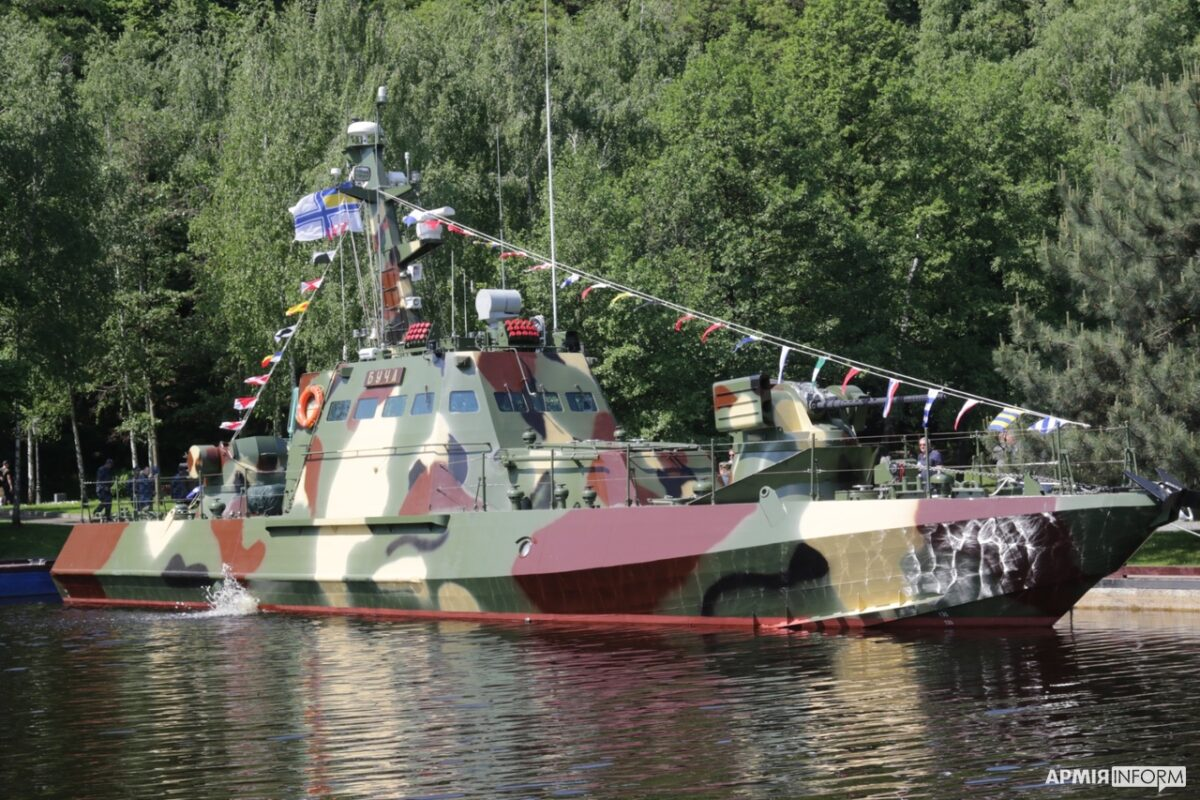
Bucha is a boat of the Dnieper river flotilla.

The Naval Forces of the Armed Forces of Ukraine reestablished the Ukrainian Dnieper flotilla in 2022. The first division of river boats was created in March and has assumed service in the north of the country. In the future, a flotilla of river boats will operate on the whole Dnieper and will consist of several divisions, which will be deployed in different cities.
