= Trypillian Incident =

1919 incident in Ukraine

- Part of Ukrainian-Soviet War
Date	June 28 – July 25, 1919
Location	Trypillia, Ukrainian Soviet Socialist Republic
Result	Green victory

Belligerents
Green armies (Borotbists)	Ukrainian Soviet Socialist Republic

Commanders and leaders
Danylo Terpylo	Mikhailo Ramatsky †

Units involved
Terpylo's force	Bolshevik Kiev city garrison

Strength
2,000	Initial force 1,500; Later force Unknown

Casualties and losses
Unknown probably few	Hundreds of Red Army soldiers massacred

The Trypillian Incident also known as the Trypillian tragedy (Russian:Трипольская трагедия) occurred in the summer of 1919 between Ukrainian anti-Bolshevik forces and the Bolshevik Kiev garrison.

== Background ==
A couple of months earlier, the Red Army captured Kiev during the Soviet westward offensive. After that, many Ukrainians were unhappy with the Soviet occupation, which ultimately culminated in an armed uprising 50 km from Kiev.

== The incident ==
On June 28, 1919, a Bolshevik unit was sent to Trypillia to liquidate one of the largest gangs of anti-communists near Kiev. A group of 1,500 soldiers was deployed and began clashing with the anti-Bolshevik forces. The Bolsheviks were defeated, and hundreds of Soviet soldiers were massacred, with only a few escaping.

== In media ==
The movie The Trypillia Tragedy (Трипольская трагедия) was filmed in 1926 based on the events of the clash.
