= The Trypillia Tragedy =

1926 Soviet drama film

- Трипольская трагедия
- Directed by: Alexander Anoschenko-Anoda
- Screenplay by: Grigori Epik
- Cinematography: Vladimir Lemke
- Production company: ВУФКУ (All-Ukrainian Motion Picture Organization)
- Release date: 1926
- Country: Soviet Union
- Language: Russian

The Trypillia Tragedy (Russian: Трипольская трагедия, romanized: Tripolskaya tragedia) is a 1926 Soviet drama film by Alexander Anoschenko-Anoda.

== Plot ==
The film is based on a historical incident, the massacre of a Komsomol special detachment during the Russian Civil War in Ukraine. In 1919, during Anton Denikin's offensive, the Komsomol forces faced the irregular troops of the Army of Independent Soviet Ukraine, led by the turncoat rebel Daniil Ilich Terpilo (known as Ataman Zelyony (Russian: Зелёный, literally "Green")).

Zelyony's men surrounded the Komsomol forces at the village of Trypillia in Ukraine south of Kyiv, trapped them on the steep banks of the Dnieper River, and slaughtered them.

== Cast ==
- Yevgenia Petrova - Kate
- Boris Bezgin - Secretary of the Komsomol District Committee
- Vera Danilevich - Komsomol fighter
- Vladimir Shakhovskoy - resident of the village of Trypillia
- George Astafev - seminarian Daniel, member of Zelyony's gang
- E. Timofeev - young Komsomol leader Mikhail Samoylovich Ratmansky
