= Dniprova Chayka =

Ukrainian educator and writer

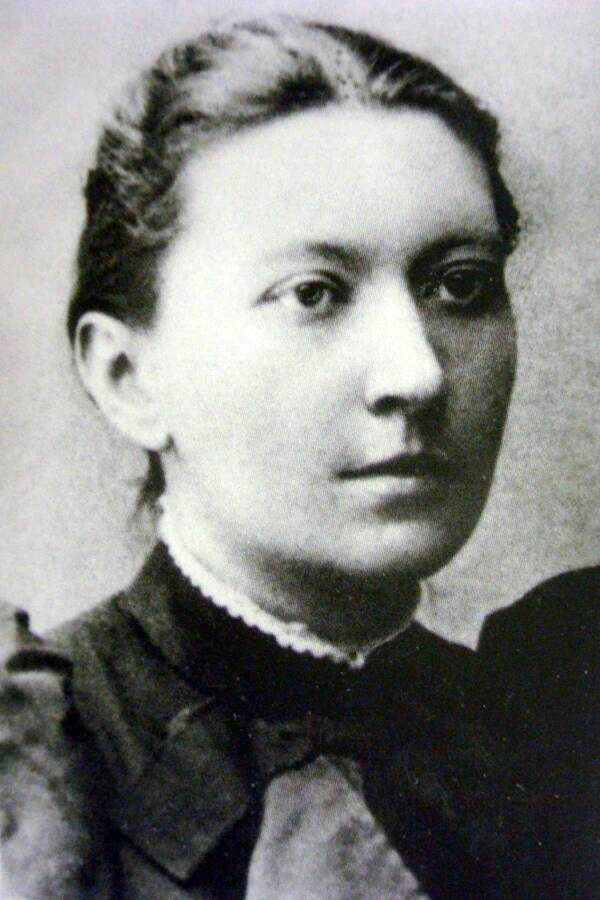
Dniprova Chayka

Dniprova Chayka was the pen name of Liudmyla Vasylevska (October 20, 1861 – March 13, 1927), a Ukrainian educator and writer. Starting as a creator of realist short stories, she eventually became known for her modernist prose and works in the sphere of children's literature, as well as folklore studies.

== Biography ==
The daughter of a Russian village priest and a Ukrainian mother, she was born Liudmyla Berezyna in Karlivka in the southern Ukraine and was educated at a private gymnasium in Odessa. She worked as a private tutor and then taught in a village school and later high school. She compiled Ukrainian folk songs and oral tradition. In 1885, she married Teofan Vasylevsky, a Ukrainian historian and patriot. Because Ukrainian nationalism was suppressed within the Russian empire, the couple often found themselves under police surveillance and, in 1905, Vasylevska's writings were confiscated.

Her first poems and short stories were published in journals in Ukraine. She also wrote poems and fairy tales for children and the librettos for a number of children's operettas; the scores were written by Mykola Lysenko. Berezyna also wrote poetry in Russian and translated Swedish and Russian literature into Ukrainian.

She and her husband separated after their children were grown up.

Vasylevska died in Hermanivka at the age of 65.

== Works ==
Dniprova Chayka started her literary career in 1884. Her early works were printed in newspapers and almanacs. She created both short stories, known for their realism and narodnik influences, as well as lyrical studies in prose, which became examples of Ukrainian Modernism. Among other works by Dniprova Chayka are poems and librettos for children's operas, some of them created in cooperation with Sofia Rusova and Andriy Hrabenko.

A collection of her works was published in 1929 and another in 1931. Her work was translated to English for the collection In the Dark of the Night (1998). A collection of folk songs recorded by Dniprova Chaika was published in 1974, and in 1987 a collection of her selected works saw the light in Kyiv.

== Legacy ==
A commemorative coin bearing her image was released into circulation in Ukraine in 2011, the 150th anniversary of her birth. It was part of a series called "Outstanding Personalities of Ukraine".
