= Dnieper Division =

- Active: 1918-1919
- Country: Ukraine
- Size: Around 4,000
- Engagements: Ukrainian War of Independence

Commanders
- Notable commanders: Danylo Terpylo

The Dnieper Division (Ukrainian: Дніпро́вська дивізія) was a military formation of the Army of the Ukrainian People's Republic, active in 1918–1919.

== History ==
The division was formed in early 1918 by Danylo Terpylo and Mykhailo Danchenko from local volunteers and former soldiers in the region south of Kyiv. It initially consisted of two large divisional-sized units, hence its occasional description as a "two-division formation".

The division operated primarily in the territory of present-day Kyiv Oblast, centred on the village of Trypillya and the towns of Vasylkiv, Bila Tserkva, and Fastiv. On 3 December 1918, the Dnieper Division was incorporated into the Siege Corps of the Sich Riflemen, growing to four regiments with approximately 4,000 soldiers.
