= Battle of Chornobyl =

1920 battle of the Polish–Soviet War

Coordinates: 51°16′20″N 30°13′27″E

- Part of Polish–Soviet War
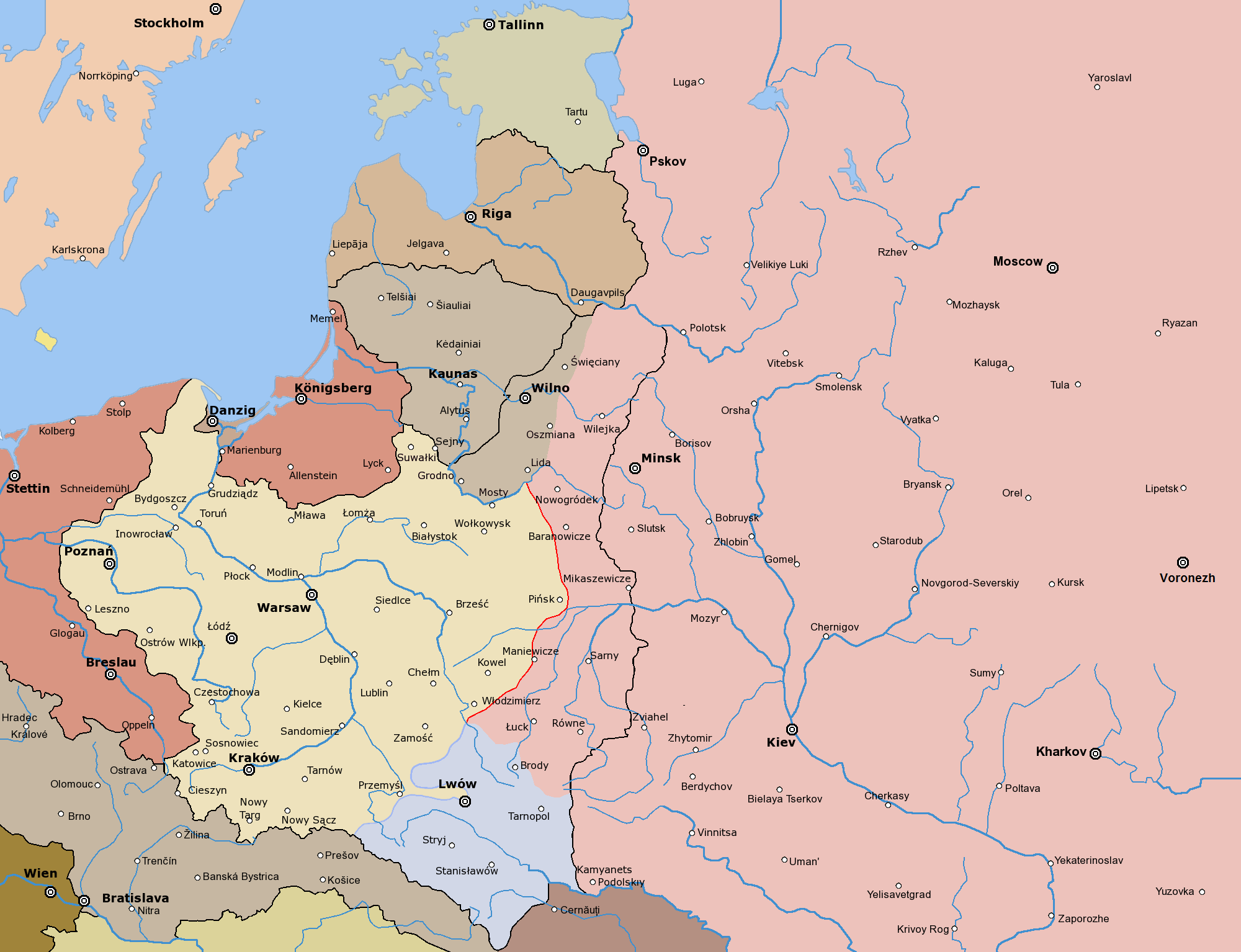
Date	27th April 1920
Location	Around Chornobyl
Result	Polish victory

Belligerents
Poland	Russian SFSR

Commanders and leaders
Feliks Jaworski	Unknown

The Battle of Chornobyl took place on 27 April 1920, near the town of Chornobyl (Chernobyl), Ukraine, during the Polish-Soviet War. It was part of the Kiev Operation of the Polish Army, and ended in Polish victory.

The main Polish unit, which operated in the swampy area of Polesia, was the 9th Infantry Division from Siedlce, commanded by General Władysław Sikorski. Its first task was to seize Chornobyl, an important Prypiat river port, and a base of the Soviet Dnieper Flotilla, which operated at the confluence of the Prypiat, and which protected the rear of the Red Army units fighting near Kiev (Kyiv). To capture Chornobyl, General Sikorski created the Cavalry Group of Major Jaworski, supported by the newly created Riverine Flotilla of the Polish Navy.

On 25 April, at 4:00 a.m., the Cavalry Group left the village of Demowicze and headed towards Chornobyl. Together with the cavalry, boats of the Flotilla sailed on the Prypiat. After a few hours, they were attacked by Soviet boats. Polish motorboats destroyed one Soviet unit and forced the enemy into retreat. At the village of Koszarowka, Major Jaworski divided his soldiers into two groups: the first, commanded by him personally, was to attack the town from north. The other, commanded by Colonel Kazimierz Galinski, was ordered to attack from the west. Both attacks were scheduled for 27 April in the morning.

Chornobyl was defended by Soviet 61st Rifle Brigade, supported by twelve boats of the Dnieper Flotilla, which were armed with cannons and heavy machine guns.

Polish columns left their positions in the evening of 26 April. The next morning, the group of Major Jaworski reached the village of Lelow, where it clashed with parts of the Soviet 61st Rifle Regiment and the Dnieper Flotilla. Thanks to support of the Polish Pinsk Flotilla, Major Jaworski and his soldiers broke through Soviet positions and opened the way towards Chornobyl. Nevertheless, due to this clash, Jaworski was late, compared to the second column, which had already attacked Chornobyl on 27 April, at 5 a.m.

Despite Soviet resistance, the infantry of the 34th Regiment, supported by an artillery battery, seized a cemetery and green areas located west of the town. At approximately 5 a.m., the unit of Major Jaworski also appeared on the spot, together with the Pinsk Flotilla. It immediately assaulted Soviet positions, forcing the enemy to retreat. The battle quickly turned into a rout, as Polish units chased fleeing Soviets. The Dnieper Flotilla retreated to the Pripyat estuary, and Polish boats returned to the port of Chernobyl.

The Battle of Chornobyl was commemorated on the Tomb of the Unknown Soldier, Warsaw, with the inscription: "CZERNOBYL 27 IV 1920".

== See also ==
- Kiev offensive (1920)

== Sources ==
- J. Bartlewicz, Flotylla Pińska i jej udział w wojnie polsko-bolszewickiej 1918–1920, Warszawa 1933 (in Polish)
- J. Izdebski, Dzieje 9 Dywizji Piechoty 1918–1939, Warszawa 2000 (in Polish)
- J. Odziemkowski, Leksykon wojny polsko-rosyjskiej, wyd. RYTM Warszawa 2004 (in Polish)
- Mullins, Justin. “Chernobyl.” New Scientist, vol. 206, no. 2755, 2010, pp. vi–vii
- Polidori, Robert., and Culbert, Elizabeth. Sperrzonen : Pripjat und Chernobyl . Steidl, 2004.
