= Obukhiv urban hromada =

Obukhiv urban hromada Обухівська міська громада
- Hromada
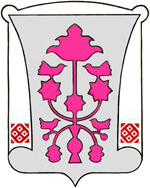
- Seal
- Interactive map of Obukhiv urban hromada
- Country: Ukraine
- Oblast: Kyiv
- Raion: Obukhiv

Area
  - Total: 396.8 km^{2} (153.2 sq mi)

Population (2020)
  - Total: 42,639
  - Density: 107.5/km^{2} (278.3/sq mi)
- Settlements: 25
- Cities: 1
- Villages: 24

Obukhiv urban hromada (Ukrainian: Обухівська міська громада) is a hromada of Ukraine, located in Obukhiv Raion, Kyiv Oblast. Its administrative center is the city of Obukhiv.

It has an area of 396.8 square kilometres (153.2 mi^{2}) and a population of 42,639, as of 2020.

The hromada contains 25 settlements: 1 city (Obukhiv), and 24 villages:

- Bezimenne
- Hermanivka
- Hryhorivka
- Husachivka
- Dereviana
- Deremezna
- Dolyna
- Zastuhna
- Koziivka
- Kopachiv
- Krasna Slobidka
- Krasne Pershe
- Kuli
- Lendy
- Makarivka
- Mala Vilshanka
- Matiashivka
- Neshcheriv
- Perehonivka
- Pershe Travnia
- Semenivka
- Stepok
- Tatsenky
- Shevchenkove

== See also ==
- List of hromadas of Ukraine
