= Danylo Terpylo =

Ukrainian military commander; leader of the Green armies (1886–1919)

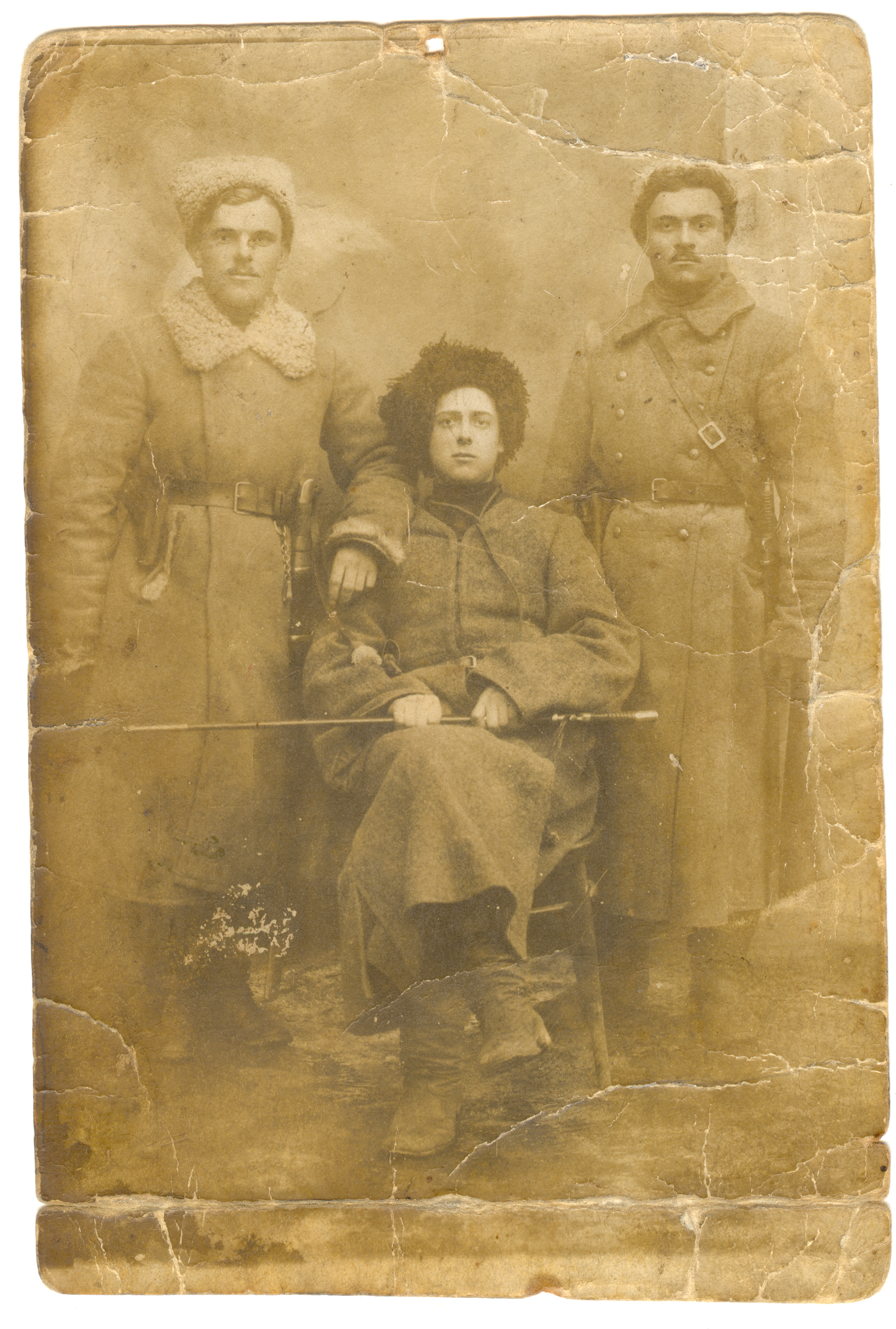
- Danylo Terpylo (sitting in the middle)
- Nickname: Otaman Zelenyy
- Born: Danylo Ilkovych Terpylo; December 28, 1886; Trypillia, Kyiv Governorate, Russian Empire (now Ukraine)
- Died: October 1919 (aged 32) Near Kaharlyk, Kyiv Governorate, Ukrainian People's Republic (now Ukraine)
- Allegiance: Russian Empire (1914–1917); Ukrainian People's Republic (1918–1919, 1919); Borotbists (Jan-July 1919)
- Service: Imperial Russian Army (1914–1917); Ukrainian People's Army (1918–1919, 1919); Green Army (1919)
- Service years: 1914-1917, 1918–1919
- Rank: Otaman
- Commands: 35th Army Corps (1914-1917); Dnieper Division (1918-1919); 1st Kiev Insurgent Division (February–July 1919); Rebel divion (July-October 1919)
- Known for: Ataman of the Green armies

Danylo Ilkovych Terpylo, (Note: Ukrainian: Данило Ількович Терпило, Danylo Il'kovych Terpylo Russian: Дании́л Ильи́ч Терпи́ло, Daniil Il'ich Terpilo) widely known as the Green Ataman (Note: Ukrainian: Отаман Зелений, Otaman Zelenyy) (28 December [O.S. 16 December] 1886 – October 1919) was a Ukrainian revolutionary, ataman and a commander of the Green armies during the Russian Civil War. Terpylo's forces fought against both the White Army, the Red Army, and the Ukrainian People's Republic forces.

== Biography ==
=== Early years ===
Danylo Ilovych Terpylo was born on December 28, 1886, in Trypillia, where he was educated first by the church-parish school and then at a Zemstvo school.

During the 1905 Russian Revolution he became a member of the Ukrainian Socialist Revolutionary Party. Terpylo was first arrested in 1907 and stayed in prison for three months. He was arrested a second time on September 22, 1908, for anti-government activity, and sent to the Arkhangelsk Oblast for three years. In 1914–1917 he was mobilized into the Russian army, participating in the World War I. He served on the Western Front at the headquarters of the XXXV Corps.

During the February Revolution, he returned to Ukraine. In 1917 he studied at the Zhytomyr school of ensigns.

After the October Revolution, the Trypillians recognized the authority of the Central Rada. The Trypillian organization of socialist-revolutionaries had a great influence in the areas of Trypillia, Cherniakhiv, Hermanivka and Obukhiv. At that time, Terpylo and his comrades were laying the network of the future insurgent movement: the structure of the army, the weapons, the places of assembly and everything else that is included in the concept of mobilization readiness.

=== Against the hetman ===
In March 1918, the German Empire and troops of the Ukrainian State came to Trypillia. The liberal-minded Ukrainian intelligentsia took a stance against the imperialist-backed Hetmanate, as did Terpylo. In November 1918, he participated in the rebellion against the Hetmanate in Trypillia. On November 21, Terpylo's troops defeated the Trypillian hetman. At that time, his detachment was made up of 4000 peasants.

In November 1918, he created a three-thousand-strong rebel division, which together with the troops of Petliura and the Sich Riflemen, occupied Kyiv in December 1918.

=== Against Petliura ===
However, once victorious, Petliura ordered Terpylo to dissolve his division. Instead, he revolted, refusing to continue fighting for the Ukrainian People's Republic.

At the beginning of January 1919 factions emerged from among the parties that were part of the Government of the Directory: from the independentist Ukrainian Social Democratic Labour Party to the left Ukrainian Socialist-Revolutionary Party (later Borotbists), who favoured closer ties to Soviet Russia. Though they all recognized Soviet power in Ukraine. In Trypillia, at the peasant Cossack congress, Terpylo stated that his aspirations were at odds with the Directory's policy and he was confronting it. After the congress, the rebels of the surrounding townships began to gather in Trypillia. A few days later, a second congress was convened, to which 80 delegates arrived. The congress elected a county executive committee and elected Terpylo as commander of the Green Army.

On January 22, 1919, a detachment of Sich Riflemen was sent from Kyiv to suppress Terpylo's rebellion. After Trotsky ordered the reorganization of Green units along the undemocratic structure of the Red Army, Terpylo turned against them too.

=== Against the Bolsheviks ===
On February 5, 1919, the Bolsheviks occupied Kiev. In April 1919, relying on the support of the population, Terpylo began a fight against the Bolshevik occupying power, which in March declared the Green movement outlawed. The Green army occupied Trypillia and killed the Bolshevik agitators there.

Terpylo formed part of the underground All-Ukrainian Revolutionary Committee and became the military commissioner of the Revolutionary War. In his address "To the peasants and workers of Ukraine", Terpylo emphasized: "We are striving for this: Ukraine must be independent...".

On April 8–10, 1919 Terpylo briefly occupied Kyiv, supporting a socialist uprising against the Bolsheviks, largely paralyzing the Bolshevik structures in the city.

The Green detachments were named “First Kyiv Soviet Division”. And already in the summer the rural areas surrounding Kyiv completely passed into the hands of the rebels. In early May, the Green Army was defeated by the Bolsheviks in Chernihiv.

In May 1919, Bolshevik authorities threw a rebel detachment of 21,000 Red Army soldiers against the rebels. The Reds launched even the Dnieper Flotilla against the rebels. By May 14–16, Terpylo was expelled from the area, and his army dispersed – reduced to two thousand, and broken up into small detachments. At the end of May 1919, the Council of People's Commissars of Ukraine announced a reward for Terpylo's head, dead or alive, in the amount of 50 thousand rubles. At the beginning of June 1919, Green moved to the left bank of the Dnieper, where they fought a guerilla war against the Bolsheviks.

In Pereyaslav, on July 15, 1919, in the presence of the local people and his army, Terpylo cancelled the Pereyaslav Agreement for "reunification" with Moscow. At this time, his strength was measured by about 30 thousand Cossacks. Terpylo's troops committed numerous pogroms. This includes participation in the pogrom at Trypillya, alongside the White Guard, which included atrocities such as the killing of children and elderly people. The Trypillya pogrom resulted in the complete evacuation of all Jews from the town. Elias Heifetz estimates that Terpylo's troops killed about 2,000 people in 15 pogroms.

=== Against Denikin ===
On August 31, 1919, Denikin's White Army captured Kyiv. On September 17, 1919, Terpylo arrived at Kamianets-Podilskyi with one of the detachments, he personally met with Symon Petliura. The rebels demanded the provision of ammunition and the immediate start of the offensive against Denikin. Afterwards, Terpylo held an assembly with his troops, which approved the recognition of the Ukrainian Directory.

Throughout the autumn, the Terpylo fought with the Whites, leading a large guerrilla army that numbered up to 30,000 soldiers. The area of activity of the guerrilla green detachments was the Chyhyryn, Cherkasy, Kaniv and Zvenyhorodka counties. The Greens kicked Denikin out of the area, and on October 11, 1919, they again managed to capture Kiev for a while.

In October 1919, the Greens entered into a battle with the Whites near Kanev and were badly wounded. Terpylo died on the way back to Trypillia, where he was buried along the bank of the river Donets. His tomb was not preserved.

== Memory ==
- ballad about the green Otaman
- song about the green Otaman
