= Obukhiv =

City in Kyiv Oblast, Ukraine

Obukhiv Обухів
- City
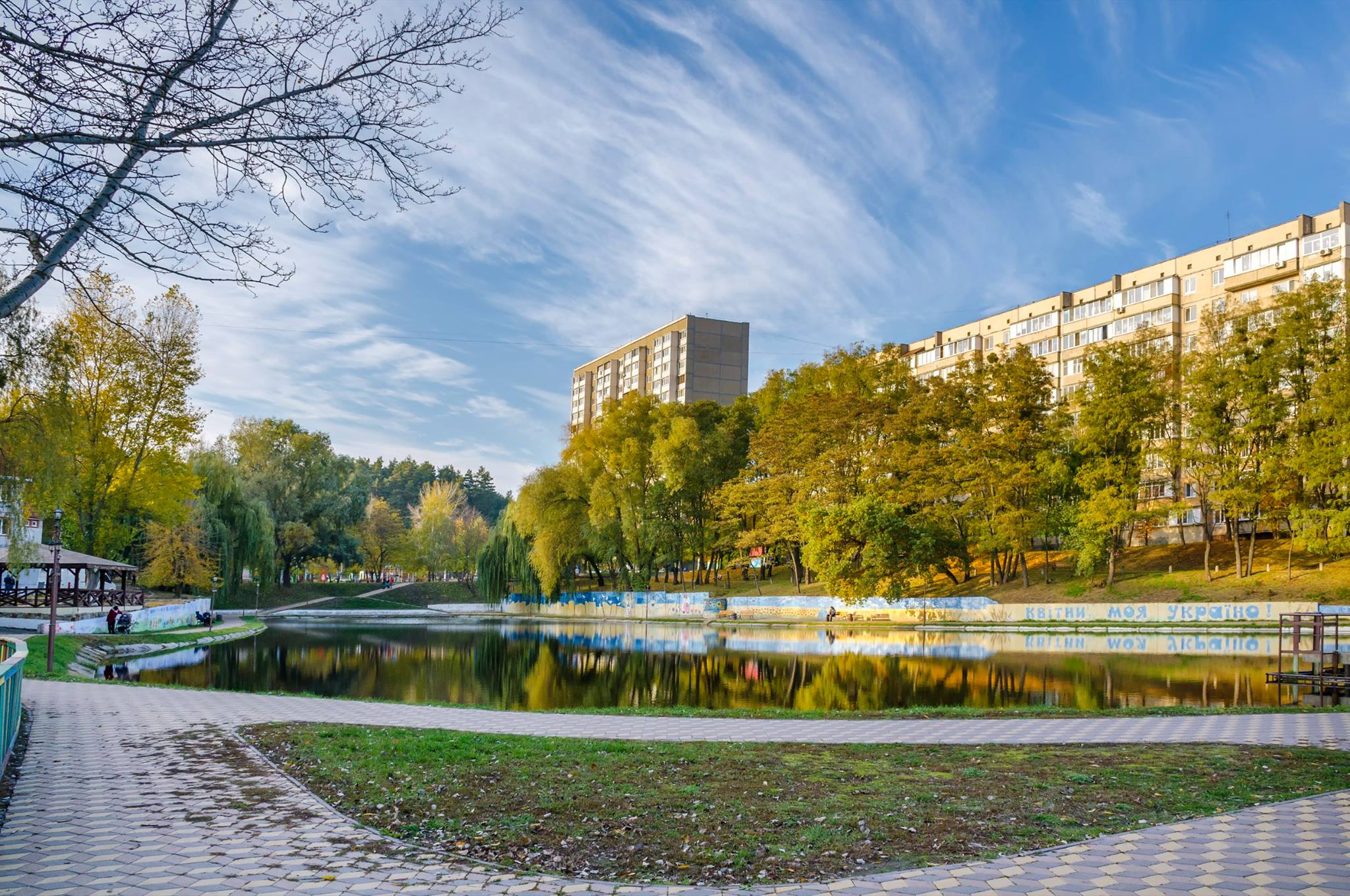
- Main square of Obukhiv

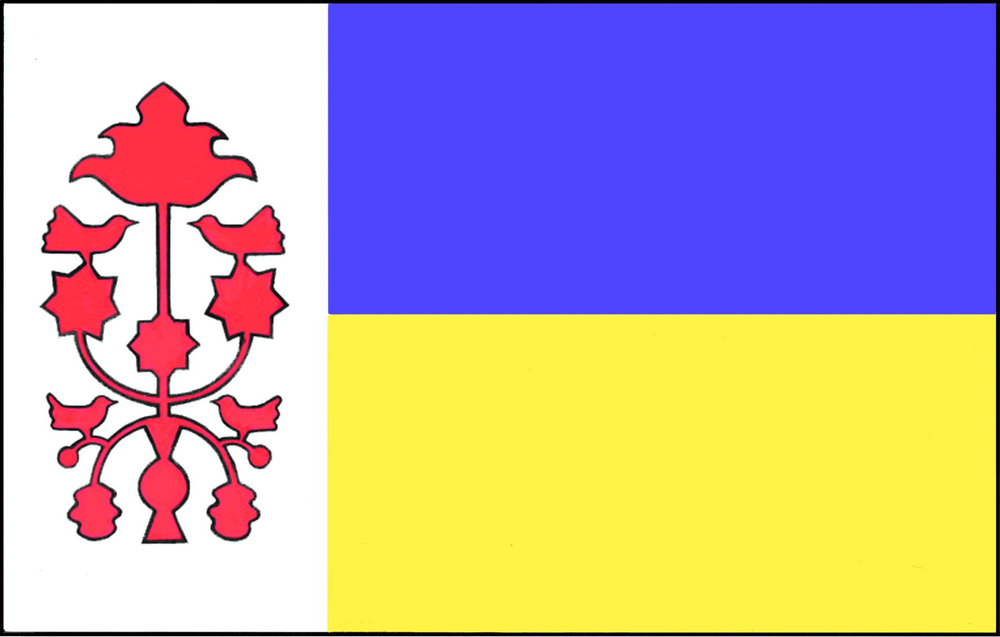
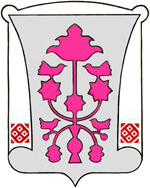
- Flag Coat of arms
- Interactive map of Obukhiv
- Location within Kyiv Oblast Location within Ukraine
- Coordinates: 50°7′48″N 30°39′24″E
- Country: Ukraine
- Oblast: Kyiv Oblast
- Raion: Obukhiv Raion
- Hromada: Obukhiv urban hromada
- First mentioned: 1362

Area
  - Total: 24.2 km^{2} (9.3 sq mi)
- Elevation: 177 m (581 ft)

Population (2022)
  - Total: 33,287
  - Density: 1,380/km^{2} (3,560/sq mi)
- Time zone: UTC+2 (EET)
  - Summer (DST): UTC+3 (EEST)
- Postal code: 08700—08705
- Area code: +380 4572

Obukhiv (Ukrainian: Обухів, IPA: [oˈbuxiu̯]) is a city in Kyiv Oblast (province) of Ukraine and the administrative center of Obukhiv Raion. It hosts the administration of Obukhiv urban hromada, one of the hromadas of Ukraine. Population: 33,287 (2022 estimate). In 2024, the population was 32,600.

The city has a Holodomor memorial and in 2009 the municipal administration took down the Lenin monument which was repeatedly vandalized. It is 178 km south - southeast of Chernobyl.

Until 18 July 2020, Obukhiv was incorporated as a city of oblast significance and the center of Obukhiv Municipality. It also served as the center of Obukhiv Raion even though it did not belong to the raion. In July 2020, as part of the administrative reform of Ukraine, which reduced the number of raions of Kyiv Oblast to seven, Obukhiv Municipality was merged into Obukhiv Raion.

== History ==
The settlement of Obukhiv, originally known as Lukavytsia was first mentioned in historical documents in 1362.

== Geography ==
Obukhiv has a dry sub-humid (0.5 - 0.65 p/pet) climate. The land area is not cultivated, but most of the natural vegetation remains intact. The landscape is mainly covered with mosaic vegetation/croplands. The climate is classified as humid continental (humid with severe winter, no dry season with a cool temperate moist forest bio-zone. The soil in the area is high in chernozems, phaeozems, greyzems (ch), dark colored, deep soils in organic matter, calcareous lower in profile, also typical of grass steppe/prairie.

=== Climate ===
July is the warmest with an average temperature of 24.8 °C at noon. January is coldest with an average temperature of -8.3 °C at night. Obukhiv has distinct cold and warm seasons, like cold winters and warm summers. The temperatures at night are cooler than during the daytime.

Winter has prolonged freezing periods, with the coldest month most often being December. July is on average the month with the most sunshine. Rainfall and other precipitation have no distinct peak month.

Climate data for Obukhiv, Ukraine
Month	Jan	Feb	Mar	Apr	May	Jun	Jul	Aug	Sep	Oct	Nov	Dec	Year
Record high °C (°F)	11.0 (51.8)	15.0 (59.0)	10.0 (50.0)	26.0 (78.8)	35.0 (95.0)	34.0 (93.2)	36.8 (98.2)	37.0 (98.6)	33.0 (91.4)	27.0 (80.6)	19.0 (66.2)	15.0 (59.0)	37 (99)
Mean daily maximum °C (°F)	−2.6 (27.3)	−1.3 (29.7)	3.9 (39.0)	13.4 (56.1)	20.3 (68.5)	23.5 (74.3)	24.8 (76.6)	24.0 (75.2)	18.9 (66.0)	12.0 (53.6)	4.5 (40.1)	0.0 (32.0)	11.8 (53.2)
Daily mean °C (°F)	−5.4 (22.3)	−4.4 (24.1)	0.4 (32.7)	8.7 (47.7)	15.1 (59.2)	18.3 (64.9)	19.6 (67.3)	18.7 (65.7)	13.9 (57.0)	8.0 (46.4)	1.9 (35.4)	−2.4 (27.7)	7.7 (45.9)
Mean daily minimum °C (°F)	−8.2 (17.2)	−7.3 (18.9)	−3.0 (26.6)	4.0 (39.2)	9.9 (49.8)	13.2 (55.8)	14.5 (58.1)	13.5 (56.3)	9.0 (48.2)	3.9 (39.0)	−0.7 (30.7)	−4.7 (23.5)	3.7 (38.6)
Record low °C (°F)	−27.0 (−16.6)	−30.0 (−22.0)	−19.0 (−2.2)	−7.0 (19.4)	−3.0 (26.6)	2.0 (35.6)	6.0 (42.8)	4.0 (39.2)	−2.0 (28.4)	−10.0 (14.0)	−25.0 (−13.0)	−30.0 (−22.0)	−30.0 (−22.0)
Average rainfall mm (inches)	35 (1.4)	32 (1.3)	34 (1.3)	47 (1.9)	55 (2.2)	97 (3.8)	74 (2.9)	57 (2.2)	60 (2.4)	37 (1.5)	45 (1.8)	39 (1.5)	612 (24.1)
Average rainy days	9	8	8	10	10	13	11	9	10	8	10	10	116
Source: Obukhiv Weather History

== Demographics ==
As of the 2001 Ukrainian census, Obukhiv had a population of 32,737 inhabitants. At the time of the census, ethnic Ukrainians accounted for roughly 88% of the population, followed by a Russian minority (10%), Belarusians (0,7%) and ethnic Poles (0,2%). The exact ethnic composition of the city was as follows:

Ethnic groups in Obukhiv
	percent
Ukrainians	88.11%
Russians	9.82%
Belarusians	0.73%
Poles	0.24%
Azerbaijanis	0.13%
Armenians	0.12%
Moldovans	0.11%
others	0.34%

In terms of spoken languages, 87% of the population spoke Ukrainian as their native language, while 11% spoke primarily Russian. The exact linguistic composition of the city was as follows:

Native languages in Obukhiv
	percent
Ukrainian	87.1%
Russian	12.3%
Belarusian	0.2%
Armenian	0.1%
others	0.3%

== Culture ==
September 15 is the Day of Obukhiv.

== Government ==
Oleksandr Levchenko was elected mayor in March 2012 (with 38.6% of the total vote); thanks to a low voter turnout of 43% with only 4,500. In the 2010 local elections Levchenko's Party of Regions also won most seats in the 46 seats city council (18 with 39,1%), followed by UDAR of Vitaliy Klychko (11 with 23,9%).

Levchenko was reelected as mayor in the October 2020 Ukrainian local elections with 51.5% of the votes as a candidate of the Servant of the People.)

== Transportation ==
=== Airports ===
No major airports are close to the city.

== International relations ==
=== Twin towns – Sister cities ===
Obukhiv is twinned with:

- Radebeul, Saxony Germany

== Notable people ==
- Andriy Malyshko (1912–1970), Ukrainian poet
- Andriy Mostovyi, the Midfield of the club Desna Chernihiv playing in Ukrainian Premier League.

== Gallery ==
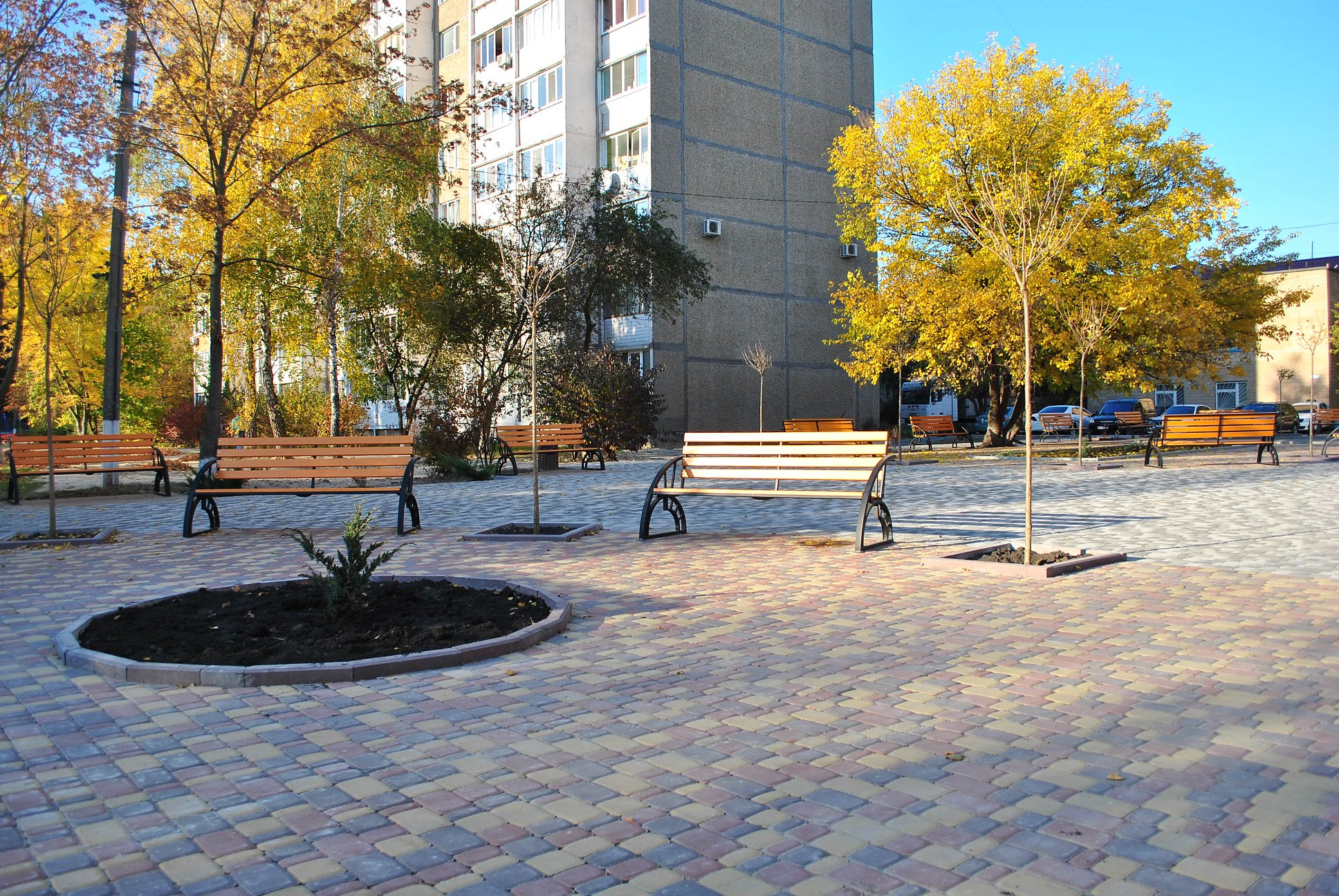
One of the city streets

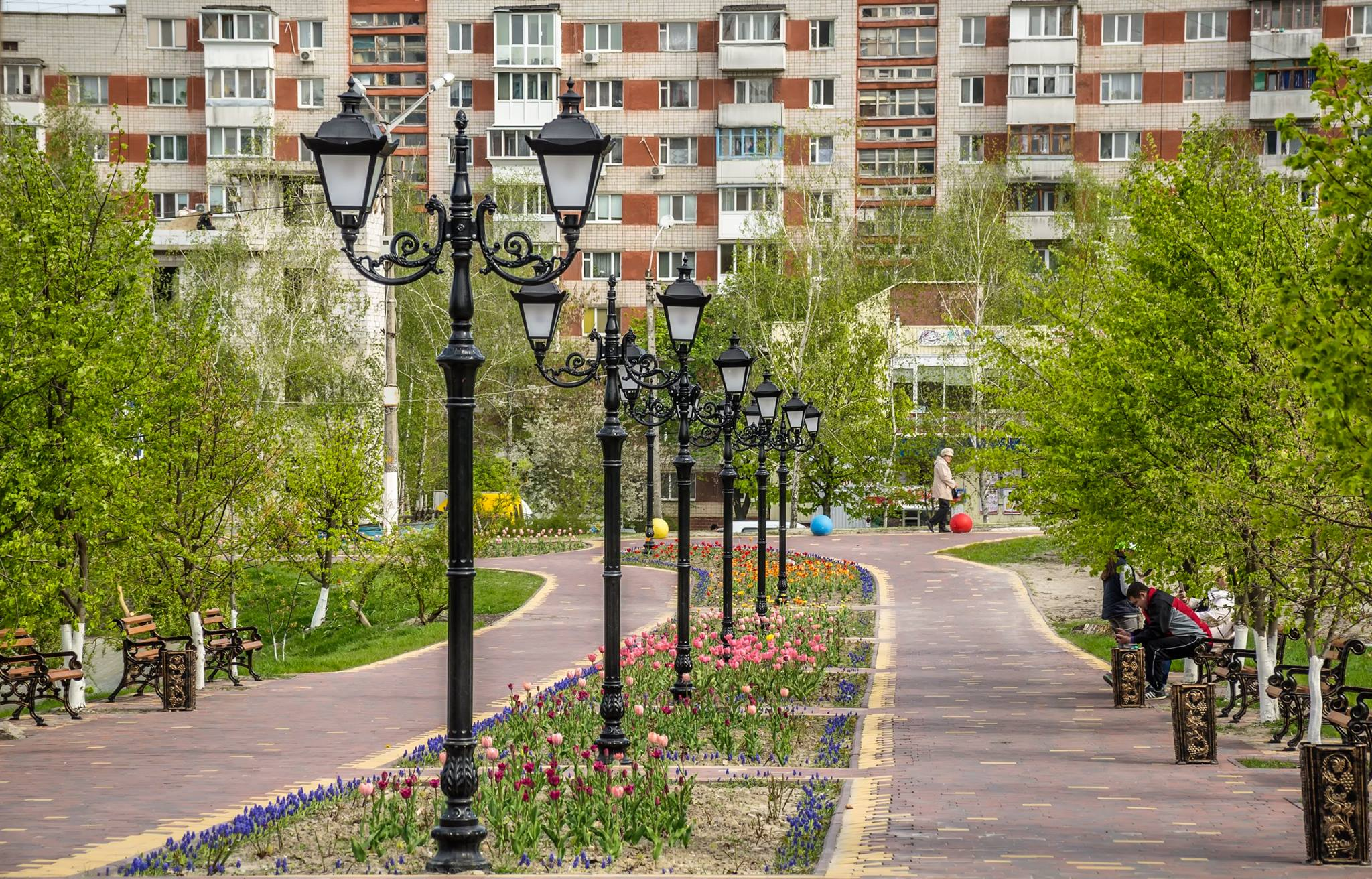
One of the city streets

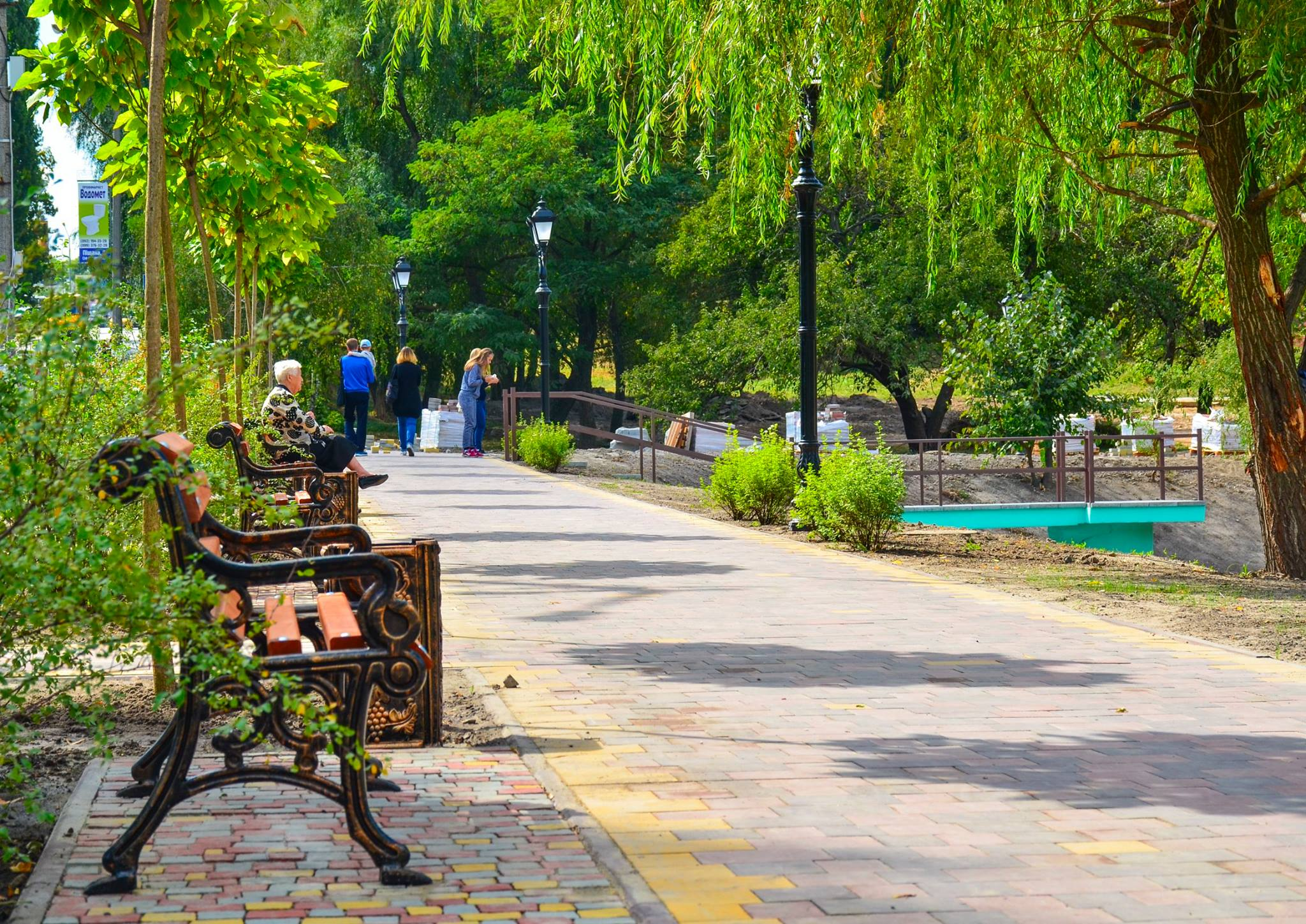
City Park

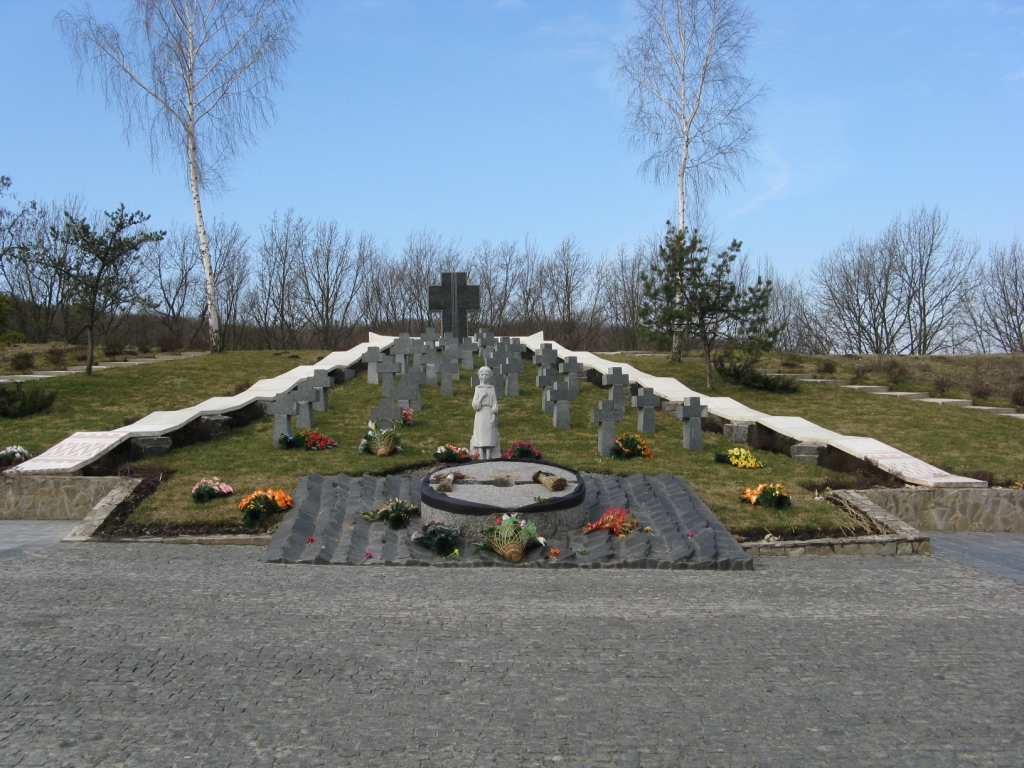
Holodomor monument

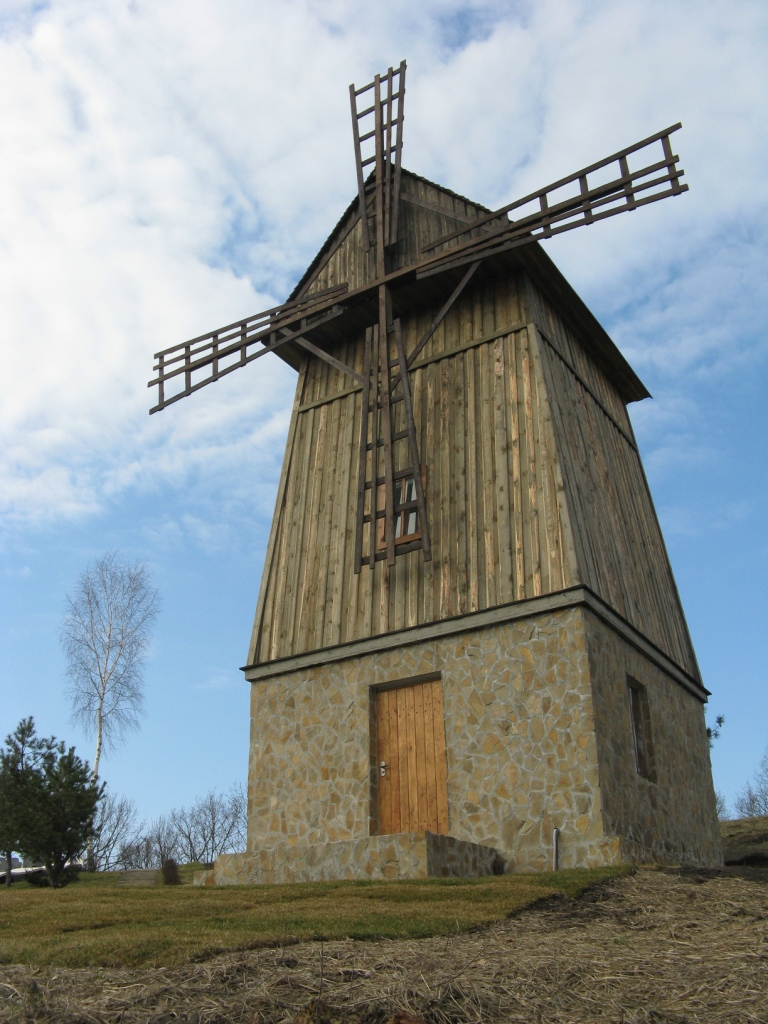
Old mill at the Holodomor monument

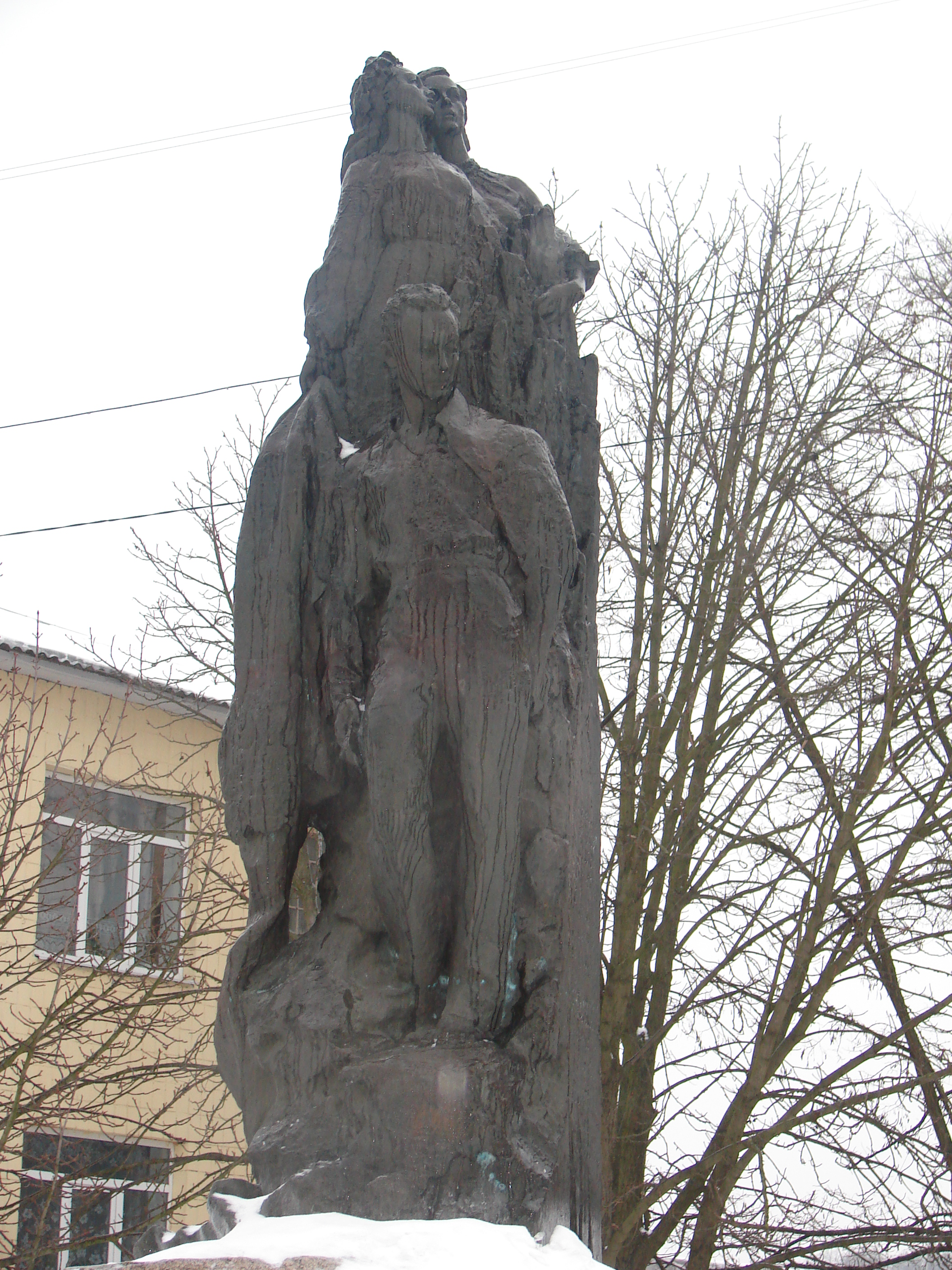
Monument to poet Andriy Malyshko
