= Hermanivka, Kyiv Oblast =

Rural locality in Kyiv Oblast, Ukraine

Coordinates: 49°59′24″N 30°33′36″E

Hermanivka (Ukrainian: Германівка) is a village (selo) in Obukhiv Raion (district), Kyiv Oblast, south of Kyiv, in central Ukraine. It belongs to Obukhiv urban hromada, one of the hromadas of Ukraine.

The Chervona River flows through the town on its way to confluence with the Dnieper. Hermanivka's history extends back some 900 years.

Hermanivka has a small museum opened in 1995 which contains more than 4,000 exhibits related to the history of the town, with substantial coverage of its involvement with the Zaporizhian Cossacks.

Cossack Hetman and Ukrainian national hero Bohdan Khmelnytsky twice battled Polish–Lithuanian Commonwealth forces at Hermanivka in 1651. A few years later, in 1658, the Hadiach Treaty between the Cossacks and Poles was declared in Hermanivka by Cossack Hetman Ivan Vyhovsky. A famous Cossack leader Severyn Nalyvaiko twice visited Hermanivka in the 1590s. Two Cossack colonels – Prokop Vereshchak and Stepan Sulyma – are buried in Hermanivka.

In the 18th century, peasants of Hermanivka, by then a part of the Russian Empire, participated actively in the anti-serfdom movement.

Hermanivka suffered greatly during the Holodomor famine of 1932–33, losing 20 percent of its population.

At present Hermanivka has 890 households, several schools, libraries and churches.
