= Trypillia =

Rural locality in Kyiv Oblast, Ukraine

Coordinates: 50°06′54″N 30°46′35″E

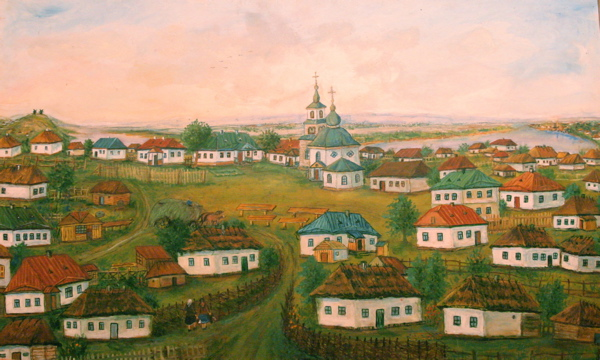
Nineteenth-century view of Trypillia, prior to damming of the Dnieper River (Regional Archeological Museum)

Trypillia (Ukrainian: Трипiлля) is a village in Obukhiv Raion (district) of Kyiv Oblast in central Ukraine, with 2,800 inhabitants (as of 1 January 2005). It belongs to Ukrainka urban hromada, one of the hromadas of Ukraine. Trypillia lies about 40 km (25 mi) south from Kyiv on the Dnipro.

== History ==
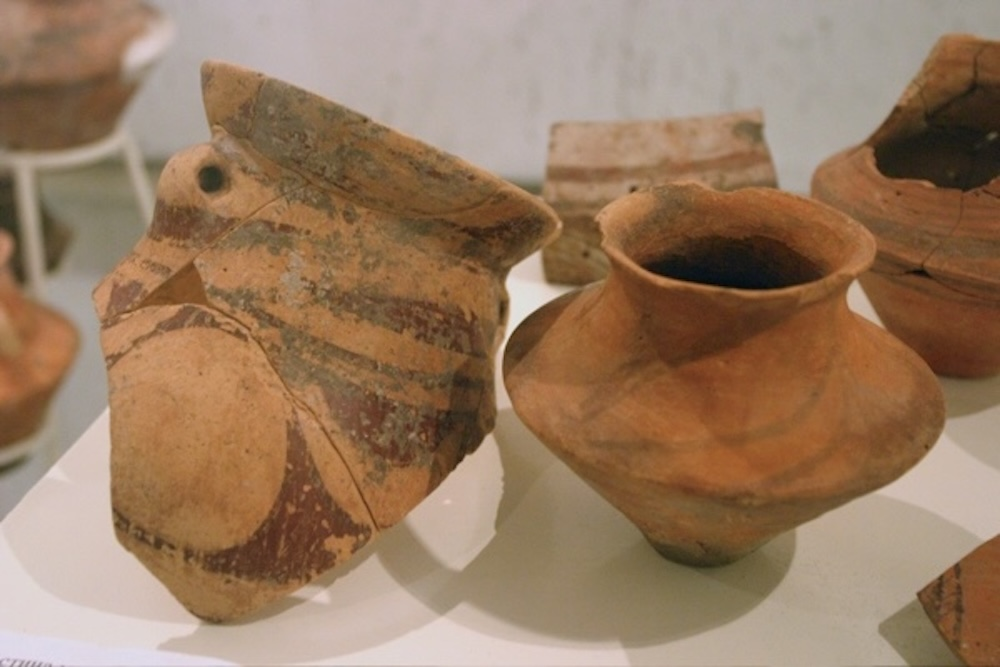
Trypillian pots (Regional Archeological Museum)

It was near Trypillia that the archaeologist Vikentiy Khvoyka discovered an extensive Neolithic site of the Cucuteni-Trypillian culture, one of the major Neolithic–Chalcolithic cultures of eastern Europe. Khvoika reported his findings in 1897 to the 11th Congress of Archaeologists, marking the official date of the discovery of this culture.

The name Trypillia means 'three fields' in Ukrainian. It was first mentioned by Kyivan chroniclers in connection with the Battle of the Stugna River in 1093. During the 12th century, Trypillia was a fortress that defended approaches towards Kyiv from the steppe. One of its rulers was Mstislav Mstislavich. During the subsequent centuries, the town dwindled into insignificance. In 1919 it was the venue of the Trypillia Incident, in which Ukrainian forces under Danylo Terpylo defeated a unit of Bolsheviks.

== See also ==
- History of Ukraine
- Neolithic Europe

== Bibliography ==
- Videiko M. Yu. Trypillia Civilization in Prehistory of Europe. Kyiv Domain Archeological Museum, Kyiv, 2005.
