= Huliaipole offensive =

2025 offensive in the Russo-Ukrainian war

- Part of the southern front of the Russo-Ukrainian war (2022–present)
- Map of the offensive as of 17 December 2025
Date	11 September 2025 – January 2026 (3 or 4 months)
Location	Southern Ukraine: Eastern Dnipropetrovsk Oblast; Northeastern Zaporizhzhia Oblast
Result	Russian victory
Territorial changes	Russia captures Huliaipole and 42 villages (Note: Ternove, Novomykolaivka, Olhivske, Novoivanivka, Berezove, Kalynivske, Stepove, Verbove, Novovasylivske, Novohryhorivka, Oleksiivka, Pryvillia, Poltavka, Pavlivka, Zlahoda, Pryvilne, Yehorivka, Vyshneve, Krasnohirske, Novooleksandrivka, Uspenivka, Rybne, Nove, Novomykolaivka, Novouspenivske, Okhotnyche, Solodke, Rivnopillia, Yablukove, Danylivka, Hai, Nechaivka, Vesele, Radisne, Nove Zaporizhzhia, Vidradne, Zatyshshia, Zelenyi Hai, Vysoke, Dobropillia, Ostapivske and Varvarivka) in Dnipropetrovsk and Zaporizhzhia Oblasts

Belligerents
Russia	Ukraine

Units involved
Russian Armed Forces; Russian Ground Forces; 127th Motor Rifle Division; 114th Motor Rifle Regiment; 36th Motor Rifle Brigade; 37th Motor Rifle Brigade; 38th Motor Rifle Brigade; Russian Aerospace Forces	Ukrainian Armed Forces; Ukrainian Ground Forces; 20th Army Corps; 141st Mechanized Brigade; 225th Assault Battalion; 154th Mechanized Brigade; Ukrainian Territorial Defence Forces; 102nd Territorial Defense Brigade; 106th Territorial Defense Brigade

As part of the southern front of the Russo-Ukrainian war, a military engagement between the Russian Armed Forces and Ukrainian Armed Forces for control over the Ukrainian city of Huliaipole and the northern surrounding area began in September 2025 and ended with the Russian capture of the city in January 2026.

== Background ==
Huliaipole has been a frontline city since the early stages of Russia's full-scale invasion in 2022, with the line of contact stagnating just south of it. The city witnessed intensive shelling in the years that followed. Citizens from Huliaipole who decided to stay went to live underground in their basements. According to the governor of Zaporizhzhia Oblast, Ivan Fedorov, only 500 civilians remained in Huliaipole by late 2025.

Following the Russian capture of Velyka Novosilka in January 2025, its forces continued advancing westward toward the Dnipropetrovsk region. By 1 September, the Russian army seized the village of Komyshuvakha, located at the border junction of the Donetsk, Dnipropetrovsk and Zaporizhzhia Oblasts.

== Offensive ==
=== Opening advances and crossing of the Yanchur river ===
The Russian Armed Forces began advancing westwards from their positions along the administrative border of Donetsk Oblast into the Dnipropetrovsk region, capturing the villages of Sosnivka and Ternove on 12 September. The next day, Russia said its forces seized the village of Novomykolaivka. Further south, Russian forces also started to advance west of Velyka Novosilka into the northeastern outskirts of the Zaporizhzhia region by securing Olhivske. Continued Russian assaults to the west along the Huliaipole – Velyka Novosilka road resulted in the capture of Novoivanivka by 19 September. That same day, Ivan Fedorov reported that a Russian drone attacked a civilian car in Huliaipole, killing a married couple. In eastern Dnipropetrovsk, elements of the Russian 36th Motor Rifle Brigade raised Russian flags in multiple locations of Berezove, located to the west of Ternove. In the final week of September, Russian forces increased control around Berezove by taking control of Kalynivske and Stepove, which was denied by the Ukrainian military.

In early October, Russian assault units made further gains to the west with the capture of Verbove. Simultaneous assaults began to the north of Malynivka, where Russian forces were able to advance into eastern Poltavka. On 7 October, units of the Ukrainian 141st Mechanized Brigade launched a counterattack in eastern Dnipropetrovsk resulting in the recapture of Sosnivka and Sichneve. In northeastern Zaporizhzhia, Russian troops advanced into Novovasylivske and Novohryhorivka. The following week, Russian forces seized the village of Oleksiivka, located to the north of Verbove. A Russian push west of Verbove led to the capture of Pryvillia, thus reaching the Yanchur river. Meanwhile in Poltavka, Russian troops took full control of the village by 19 October. Geolocated footage indicated that Russian forces established a bridgehead across the Yanchur river with the seizure of Zlahoda (formerly Pershotravneve).

=== Push towards the Haichur river and approach of the city ===
In the final week of October, the Russian army secured the settlements of Pavlivka, Pryvilne and Krasnohirske, all located on the right bank of the Yanchur river. Further north, soldiers of the Russian 36th Motor Rifle Brigade displayed Russian flags over the villages of Vyshneve and Novooleksandrivka, indicating that they are under Russian control. One week later, Russian forces gained a second foothold across the Yanchur river with the capture of Uspenivka. In the days that followed, Russian units of the 37th Motor Rifle Brigade levelled the frontline along the left bank of the Yanchur river seizing the village of Rybne. Due to dense fog and increased pressure, Ukrainian forces withdrew from the settlements of Nove, Novomykolaivka, Novouspenivske, Okhotnyche and Solodke in eastern Zaporizhzhia. Ukraine's Southern Defense Forces spokesman Vladyslav Voloshyn told ABC News that Russia launched over 400 artillery strikes per day on Ukrainian positions. Ukrainian commander-in-chief Oleksandr Syrskyi acknowledged that the situation in the Huliaipole sector had deteriorated, with the "numerically superior" Russian forces capturing three settlements and clashing in Rivnopillia and Yablukove. Governor Ivan Fedorov reported that a 56-year-old civilian was killed by a Russian FPV drone in Huliaipole.

The Ukrainian army pulled back from Rivnopillia on 12 November. The day after, DeepStateMap showed that Russian forces had taken control of Rivnopillia and Yablukove located to the northeast of Huliaipole. The capture of Rivnopillia gave Russian forces operational room to advance on the city of Huliaipole from the north. As a result of this retreat, the fighting came significantly closer to Huliaipole itself and the remaining residents started to evacuate. Vladyslav Voloshyn reported that Ukrainian forces were clashing with Russians west of Solodke, preventing a Russian advance toward Varvarivka. Further north, Russian forces penetrated Ukrainian defenses through the village of Yehorivka. Russian units were spotted waving flags in the neighbouring settlement of Danylivka, thus cutting the T-0401 Pokrovske – Huliaipole highway. Towards Pokrovske itself, the Russian 36th Motor Rifle Brigade took control of Hai on 17 November. Governor Ivan Fedorov, announced on 20 November that the regional administration was beginning to evacuate civilians from Huliaipole, at a rate of around 10 to 20 people each day. At the time of the announcement, an estimated number of 400 people remained inside the city.

Along the T-0401 highway, Russian forces reached the eastern bank of the Haichur river by gaining a foothold in the settlements of Nechaivka, Radisne and Nove Zaporizhzhia. At the same time, Russian units began to advance east of Huliaipole, seizing the locality of Vesele. According to Vladyslav Voloshyn, 150 Russian soldiers were killed every day in the Huliaipole sector, representing half of daily Russian casualties on the southern front. The Russian army captured the remaining villages of Vysoke, Zelenyi Hai and Zatyshshia to the east of Huliaipole by 27 November. As a result of these advances, Russian troops reached both the eastern and northern flank of the city of Huliaipole. The Southern Defense Forces reported that they eliminated at least 250 Russian soldiers and 50 pieces of military equipment each day. They also denied reports of an encirclement at Huliaipole. Military analysts of DeepState described a chaotic retreat of the Ukrainian 102nd Territorial Defense Brigade caused by Russian troops infiltrating its rear positions. Amid the confusion, one of the battalions lost command and control and retreated without orders, which resulted in incidents of friendly fire with the 225th Assault Battalion. Furthermore, they reported Russian execution of four captured Ukrainian drone operators. According to The New York Times, the Russian army seized 75 square miles around the city of Huliaipole in November.

=== Assault and subsequent capture of Huliaipole ===
At the beginning of December, Russian forces advanced in the fields north of Huliaipole towards Varvarivka. Simultaneously, Russian troops began assaulting the city of Huliaipole itself from the north and east. This led to Russian forces penetrating into the eastern and northeastern parts of the city. Geolocated footage indicated that Russian units also made advances in southeastern Huliaipole. Meanwhile along the T-0401 highway, Russian assault groups were spotted in the villages of Dobropillia and Varvarivka by 14 December. In the second half of December, Russian forces crossed the Haichur river and advanced into central Huliaipole. The Russian army managed to capture the headquarters of the 1st Battalion of the Ukrainian 106th Territorial Defense Brigade. Video footage showed Russian soldiers inside the abandoned command post, accessing multiple laptops and an unlocked smartphone. On 20 December, the Russian forces executed three captured Ukrainian soldiers. In eastern Dnipropetrovsk, Ukrainian forces managed to regain control over several villages during this month, including Orestopil and Sosnivka.

On 27 December, Russia reported the complete capture of Huliaipole. In response, the Ukrainian General Staff dubbed the Russian announcement "false" and added that the defensive operation of its forces in the western parts of the settlement is still ongoing. The next day, DeepStateMap displayed the entirety of Huliaipole as a gray zone, indicating an unclear frontline. The Southern Defense Forces reported that, although part of the city was under Russian control, a "significant part" of it remained under Ukrainian control; they additionally reported to have killed 300 Russian soldiers and destroyed dozens of pieces of military equipment that same day. DeepState reported that Russian and Ukrainian forces were present throughout the city, and that they were likely sheltering in neighbouring basements, while only assault groups operated in the open. Both the Ukrainian Defense Forces and DeepState reported that Russian forces had significantly more manpower in the area.

According to military blogger David Axe of Euromaidan Press, on 31 December, the city was likely seized by Russian forces, noting that if there are any Ukrainian forces in the city they were "probably clinging to the western outskirts". DeepStateMap showed on 15 January 2026 that Russian forces had advanced in the city. The following day, DeepState analysts reported that continuous Russian infantry offensives had resulted in most of the city falling under Russian control, although intense fighting was still taking place in the western portion of the city. On 19 January, Vladyslav Voloshyn described the city as a gray zone and reported that Russian forces were placing anti-personnel and anti-tank mines in the areas they could not hold. The Institute for the Study of War confirmed in its report of 6 February that Russia captured the city on a prior date.

== Aftermath ==
In the following month, the Ukrainian army launched a counteroffensive in the eastern Dnipropetrovsk region in an attempt to reverse some of the Russian advances.
Vladislav Voloshyn, spokesman for Ukraine's Southern Defense Forces, reported that heavy fighting continued in the region. Over one week, from 13 to 19 April 2026, 80 Russian assaults were recorded, who "lost nearly 1,800 personnel and 800 units of weapons and military equipment".

On 16 September 2026, the ISW reported that a Ukrainian brigade reported that Russian forces continued to suffer heavy losses while conducting offensive operations in the Huliaipole direction, with 750 killed and wounded per day (within the brigade's area of operations). The Russian 5th Combined Arms Army operating in region was also reportedly "constantly" receiving reinforcements and drone operators, including from Russia's elite "Rubikon" unit.

== Analysis ==
The Huliaipole sector had been one of the most stable parts of frontline, which has not seen any movement since the first months of the full-scale war. A new dynamic in this direction emerged in late 2025 when the Russian army began advancing westwards from Donetsk Oblast in the east towards Huliaipole, instead of directly from the south. The majority of Ukrainian defenses were built to defend attacks from the south. According to The Kyiv Independent, the Russian advances north of Huliaipole could lead to Russia outflanking Ukraine's main defense line in Zaporizhzhia Oblast in 2026, with the potential of making a push towards the city of Zaporizhzhia itself thereafter.

The Institute for the Study of War assessed that Russia's ability to cross the Haichur river will be the determining factor for the Russian army to make further operationally significant advances to the west. Vladyslav Voloshyn emphasised the strategic importance of Huliaipole, as a transport and logistical hub between Pokrovske and the regional capital of Zaporizhzhia. Analysts from DeepState reported that the lowland terrain would make defending Huliaipole difficult and called for a preparatory defensive line to be built behind the city, to prevent a repeat of the battle of Avdiivka.

== See also ==
- Battle of Krasnohorivka
- Battle of Kurakhove
- Battle of Vuhledar
