= 2026 Ukrainian counteroffensives =

2026 offensive in the Russo-Ukrainian war

2026 Ukrainian counteroffensive
- Part of the eastern and southern front of the Russo-Ukrainian war (2022–present)
- Border guards of the Pomsta Brigade in liberated Ridkodub during Vivaldi
Date	11 February 2026 – present (9 months and 1 week)
Location	Eastern and Southern Ukraine: Eastern Dnipropetrovsk Oblast; Western Donetsk Oblast; Northeastern Zaporizhzhia Oblast
Status	Ongoing

Belligerents
Ukraine	Russia

Commanders and leaders
Mykhailo Drapatyi; Oleksandr Syrskyi; Oleh Apostol; Andriy Biletsky	Valery Gerasimov

Units involved
Order of battle	Order of battle

Casualties and losses
See Casualties and casualty claims	See Casualties and casualty claims

In February 2026, Ukraine launched a local counteroffensive on the southern front of the Russo-Ukrainian war with the goal of expelling Russian forces from the Dnipropetrovsk Oblast. The offensive later extended into Donetsk Oblast and aimed to disrupt Russia’s 2026 spring-summer offensive.

The offensive marked the first time since the 2024 Kursk offensive that Ukrainian forces made a monthly net gain of territory over Russia and the largest Ukrainian offensive inside the country since the 2023 counteroffensive.

Later that same year, Ukraine also launched Operation Vivaldi, in reference to Antonio Vivaldi's notable work The Four Seasons, in the northern part of Donetsk Oblast, near the city of Lyman.

== Background ==
In the second half of 2025, the Russian army made advances towards the city of Huliaipole, taking control of several villages in Dnipropetrovsk Oblast. Ukraine had mostly been conducting defensive operations throughout 2024 and 2025. However, the Ukrainian command stressed that victory on the battlefield could not be achieved through defence alone. Therefore, the Ukrainian army was planning to launch an offensive in 2026.

In early February 2026, Russian war bloggers and channels began publishing reports of a Ukrainian offensive in the south. The Ukrainian army initially denied the reports. The initial February 2026 local counteroffensive on the southern front of the Russo-Ukrainian war had the goal of expelling Russian forces from the Dnipropetrovsk Oblast.

== Counteroffensive ==
=== Southern front ===
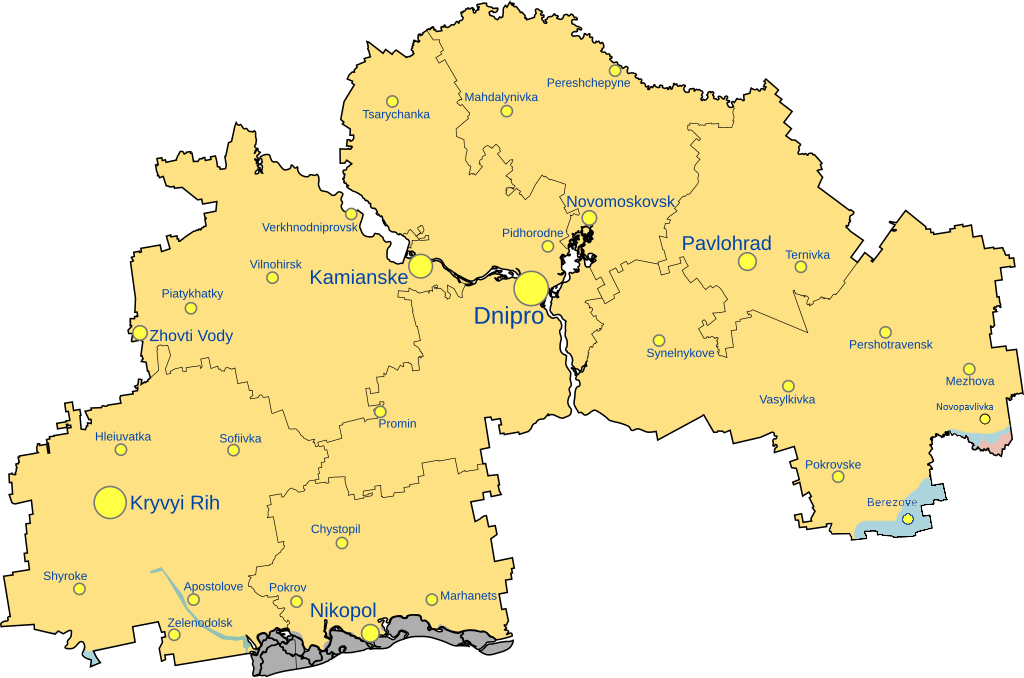
Map of Dnipropetrovsk Oblast as of 21 August 2026, with Russian-occupied areas in red and areas liberated by Ukrainian troops in blue

The Ukrainian Air Assault Forces launched an offensive from their positions along the Vovcha river in eastern Dnipropetrovsk towards the south. This sector of the frontline is referred to by the Ukrainian army as the “Oleksandrivka front,” named after the settlement of Oleksandrivka located south of Pokrovske. Ukrainian forces managed to advance into the village of Vidradne. Ukrainian military observer Kostyantyn Mashovets reported on 15 February that Ukrainian troops pushed Russian forces out of Oleksiivka and Vyshneve and penetrated Russian defenses by the Yanchur river reaching up to Zlahoda. After one week of fighting, Ukraine recorded its biggest territorial gains since June 2023.

Ukrainian president Volodymyr Zelenskyy stated in an interview with AFP that the Ukrainian army recaptured 300 square kilometers on the southern front, without specifying the exact area of advances. The Institute for the Study of War (ISW) assessed on 21 February that Ukrainian forces took control of Hai and Novooleksandrivka on a prior date. Additional geolocated footage showed Ukrainian troops advancing into the village of Ternove. Two days later, the ISW assessed Ukrainian control over the villages of Ostapivske, Nechaivka, and Radisne due to a lack of visual evidence of Russian presence. Ukraine's Air Assault Forces reported that its units seized eight settlements in the Oleksandrivka direction. Ukrainian commander Oleksandr Syrskyi corroborrated this report and added that the Armed Forces of Ukraine regained control over 400 square kilometers in the south. Geolocated footage showed Ukrainian units advancing south of Verbove by 25 February. The following day, the ISW assessed that Ukrainian forces captured Pryvillia and Zlahoda (formerly Pershotravneve). The seizure of these settlements also indicates that Ukraine likely has control over Danylivka and Yehorivka along the Yanchur river. Further to the east, fighting took place near the villages of Ternove and Berezove.

At the end of the month of February, Ukraine captured more territory than it lost to Russia. This marked the first month since the summer of 2023 that Ukrainian forces made a net gain of territory compared to Russia (excluding the 2024 Kursk offensive). In early March, Ukrainian commander Syrskyi confirmed that the Ukrainian counteroffensive was ongoing and led by Ukraine's Air Assault Forces under the command of brigadier general Oleh Apostol. On 10 March, Ukrainian major general Oleksandr Komarenko told RBC-Ukraine that almost the entire territory of the Dnipropetrovsk Oblast has been recaptured by the Ukrainian military. He added that fighting is ongoing in three settlements, while two others still need to be cleared. That same day, the ISW reported that Ukrainian forces recently took control of Kalynivske and Stepove. The following day, fighting reached the village of Novohryhorivka, indicating that Ukrainian troops crossed the administrative border of the Dnipropetrovsk and Zaporizhzhia oblasts.

A second Ukrainian crossing into Zaporizhzhia Oblast occurred near the Yanchur river where Ukrainian units seized the settlement of Rybne. On the other hand, Russian forces maintained control over Berezove, while the Ukrainian army advanced into the southeastern parts of Novomykolaivka. By 19 March, the fighting continued for Novohryhorivka and extended to the outskirts of nearby Novoivanivka. One week later, Ukraine’s 95th Air Assault Brigade announced the capture of Berezove. Ukrainian commander Syrskyi reported on 27 March that Ukraine retook control of 470 square kilometers of territory and cleared 12 settlements of Russian forces. War analyst Emil Kastehelmi expressed caution in response to this announcement, noting that the roughly 400 square kilometers captured had been mentioned several times over the past few weeks. He observed that the initial Ukrainian momentum is gone compared to the progress made in February and early March.

The Russian army managed to halt further Ukrainian advances in the area and recaptured the settlements of Berezove and Ternove by early April. Commander of Ukraine’s 1st Assault Regiment, Dmytro Filatov, told Ukrainska Pravda that the counteroffensive prioritised advances in Dnipropetrovsk Oblast over the recapture of the city of Huliaipole. Over the entire month of April, Ukraine achieved a net gain of territory over Russia. Ukrainian president Zelenskyy said the frontline situation in the east was the ‘most favourable’ for Ukraine in 10 months.

In late May, the Ukrainian army launched a renewed offensive near the border of the Dnipropetrovsk Oblast and the Donetsk Oblast. The Institute for the Study of War assessed that Ukrainian forces had retaken control over the villages of Andriivka-Klevtsove, Zelenyi Hai and Tovste in western Donetsk, reportedly capturing 30 Russian troops when liberating the former. Furthermore, Ukrainian units advanced into the settlements of Oleksandrohrad and Piddubne. DeepStateMap reported that Ukraine also seized Novoselivka just across the border in Dnipropetrovsk. Ukrainian forces had largely halted the Russian spring-summer offensive by the end of the month.

Ukrainian commander Syrskyi announced on 8 June that the Ukrainian military had recaptured 600 square kilometers of territory since the start of the counteroffensive. As shown by footage published on 13 June, by that time Ukrainian forces were operating east of Ternove and north of Zaporizke, indicating that Ukraine retook control over Berezove and Ternove. In addition, Ukrainian troops seized the village of Novoheorhiivka. Footage published two days prior indicated Ukrainian troops had recently launched an assault toward the village of Voskresenka. Russian forces restored control over the settlement by 24 June.

Two weeks later, the Ukrainian 37th Marine Brigade seized Novokhatske, located to the east of Zelenyi Hai. Ukraine’s 425th Skelya Regiment announced on 14 July the capture of the settlements of Zaporizke, Vorone, Sichneve and Maliivka in the eastern Dnipropetrovsk region. On 19 July, Ukrainian military observer Kostyantyn Mashovets reported that Ukrainian forces were clearing Novopavlivka of Russian presence. On 20 July, soldiers of Ukraine's 225th Separate Assault Regiment conducted a 'mopping-up' operation in the settlements of Ternuvate, Kosivtseve, Rizdvianka, Verkhnia to eliminate Russian infiltration groups. During the operation, they reportedly captured 64 Russian prisoners.

On 12 August, the Ukrainian Air Assault Forces published a list of 26 settlements (Note: Berezove, Hrushivske, Kalynivske, Krasnohirskе, Maliivka, Myrne, Novoheorhiivka, Novohryhorivka, Novomykolaivka, Novokhatske, Oleksandrohrad, Piddubne, Pryvillia, Pryvilne, Rybne, Sichneve, Stepove, Ternove, Tovste, Tsehelne, Voskresenka, Yalta, Zaporizke, Zelenyi Hai, Zirka and Zlahoda.) that were captured by its forces during the counteroffensive on the Oleksandrivka front. President Zelenskyy claimed that Ukrainian forces had recaptured 745 square kilometers since the operation's start.

=== Lyman front ===
Military control of Donetsk Oblast as of March 5th 2026: Russian-occupied territory in shades of red, Ukrainian-controlled territory in yellow and blue

The Russian army conducted a protracted campaign in the first half of 2026 to advance on the Ukrainian ‘fortress belt’ from the north by attempting to encircle the city of Lyman. Ukrainian forces began counterattacking the Russian salient north of Lyman by the end of May. This resulted in the capture of Ridkodub and additional advances toward Nove. Ukrainian units seized the village of Karpivka by 8 June, while fighting continued for Lypove and Nove. In the meantime, Russian forces continued to infiltrate the city of Lyman. By the end of June, Ukrainian forces advanced into the settlement of Lypove. The spokesperson of the Ukrainian Armed Forces, Viktor Tregubov, stated in late June that the Ukrainian army was successfully pushing Russia back north of Lyman.

Following over two months of operational security (OPSEC), military analysts and mappers began assessing the results of the Ukrainian counterattacks north of Lyman in early September. Ukrainian forces pressed the Russian salient from three sides, with the main thrust driving into Nove from the north. Russian milbloggers acknowledged by early September the Ukrainian counteroffensive near Lyman, with some bloggers claiming that Russian troops were forced to withdraw from their positions. In the weeks that followed, Ukrainian forces gradually advanced inside the salient, with some mappers estimating the recapture of up to 240 square kilometers in northern Donetsk Oblast.

Ukrainian 3rd Army Corps commander, Andriy Biletsky, confirmed the Ukrainian counteroffensive near Lyman on 15 September. During the operation, codenamed Vivaldi, the 3rd Army Corps cleared the settlements of Korovii Yar, Novoselivka, Oleksandrivka, Serednie and Yarova from Russian infiltrators. Furthermore, Biletsky emphasized maintaining the operational silence as the offensive was still ongoing. The Ukrainian elimination of the Russian salient north of Lyman would thwart Russia’s plans to encircle Ukraine’s fortress belt from the north. The Russian Defence Ministry denied reports of Ukrainian successes near Lyman, claiming that Russian units continued advancing in the area, contradicting both Russian milbloggers and geolocated footage.

On 20 September, Biletsky announced that the second phase of Operation Vivaldi resulted in the recapture of Derylove, Drobysheve and Shandryholove. He claimed that Russian forces had lost 800 troops in this second phase, and more than 3,000 during both phases of the operation. One week later, Biletsky stated in a video that Ukrainian forces took control of Ridkodub, Karpivka, Katerynivka, Nove and Novomykhailivka in northern Donetsk Oblast. He also stated that the operation is ongoing, and will include a fourth phase.

On 14 October 2026, phase four of Operation Vivaldi concluded, with some 101 square kilometers of territory claimed to have been recaptured. The settlements of Zelena Dolyna, Lypove, and Kolodiazi were recovered by Ukrainian forces. In total, brigadier general Andriy Biletsky, commander 3rd Army Corps, said that all four stages had recaptured 277 square kilometers of territory and recovered 16 settlements.

== Casualties and casualty claims ==
=== Russia ===
On 12 August 2026, Ukrainian President Zelenskyy claimed that 9,550 Russian soldiers had been killed, 6,600 had been wounded, and an unspecified number had been taken prisoner since the start of Operation Vivaldi.

On 20 September 2026, Brigadier General Andriy Biletsky, the commander 3rd Army Corps, claimed that Russian forces had lost 800 troops during phase two of Operation Vivaldi and that more than 3,000 Russian soldoers had become causalites during both phase one and two of the operation.

On 29 September 2026, Brigadier General Andriy Biletsky claimed that 2,000 Russian troops killed or wounded and 250 taken prisoner during phase three of Operation Vivaldi.

On 14 October 2026, Brigadier General Andriy Biletsky claimed that in total, all four stages of Operation Vivaldi had inflicted 8,000 casualties on Russian forces, with stage four claiming to have inflicted 3,000 casualties on Russian forces. He also claimed that the Russian 144th Motor Rifle Division of the 20th Combined Arms Army had been effectively defeated and "ceased to exist" as an organized force.

=== Ukraine ===
On 25 May 2026, American volunteer Spencer Burns Meek who was serving with the 3rd Assault Brigade was killed during the initial stages of Operation Vivaldi. His body was recovered in September and repatriated in October.

== Analysis ==
Two soldiers of the 2nd Assault Battalion of the 3rd Assault Brigade handling EW equipment

The Ukrainian counteroffensive in Dnipropetrovsk and subsequently Donetsk oblasts followed Elon Musk's February decision to block Russian forces from accessing Starlink. This enabled Ukrainian forces to conduct offensive operations due to compromised Russian command and control and decreased situational awareness. Furthermore, the Ukrainian action prevented Russia from executing its 2026 spring-summer offensive. However, despite the Ukrainian offensive, the Russian army continued launching offensive operations west of Huliaipole toward Orikhiv.

According to the Institute for the Study of War, Operation Vivaldi was a "dramatic setback" to the Russian goal of encircling the fortress belt.

Center for European Policy Analysis (CEOPA) noted that Operation Vivaldi included significant innovations in drone and combined arms warfare. The 3rd Army Corps used electronic warfare (EW), air defense (AD) units as well as both aerial drones and ground drones in conjunction with tanks and armored vehicles engaged in maneuver warfare. While EW and AD teams suppressed Russian reconnaissance drones heavy UAVs were used to air-drop kamikaze ground robots behind Russian lines. UGVs also advanced ahead of infantry, clearing mines as armed UGVs cleared Russian troops from villages.

TVP World analysis of the offensive called it the second drone revolution of the war. The first revolution was the introduction of cheap drones that stopped the movement of the frontlines and the current second revolution uses drones and electronic warfare as part of a greater system allowing Ukraine to move the frontlines again. Australian former major-general Mick Ryan described the operation as a “large, real-time experiment and proving ground”.

== See also ==
- 2022 Kharkiv counteroffensive
- 2022 Kherson counteroffensive
- Middle strike campaign
- Velyka Novosilka offensive
