= Russian occupation of Dnipropetrovsk Oblast =

Military occupation by Russia

- Part of Russian invasion of Ukraine
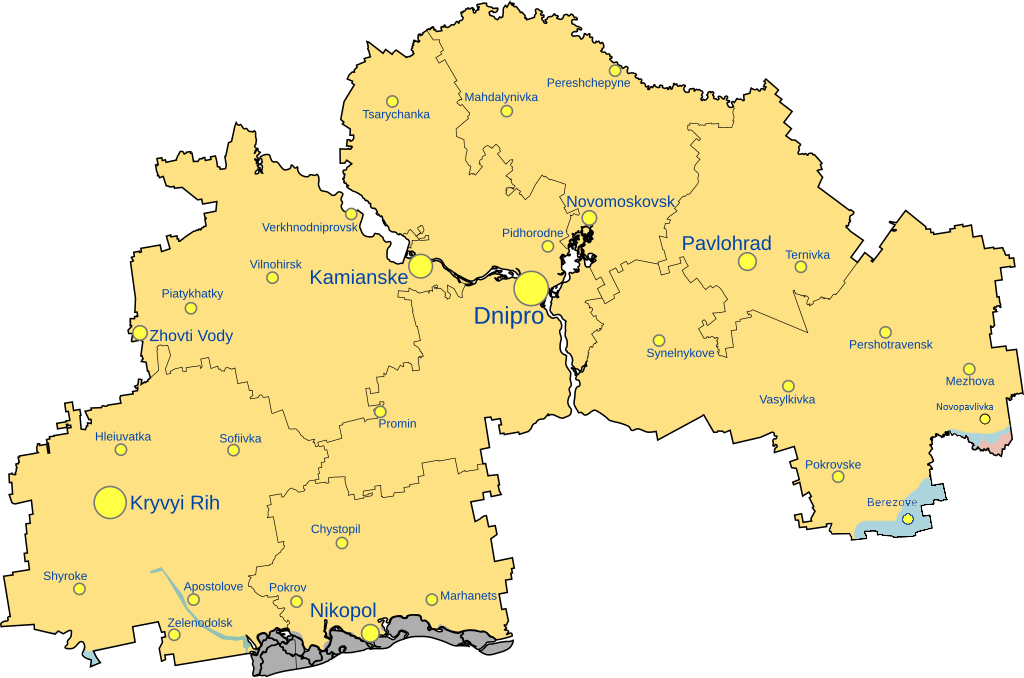
- Territory never captured by Russian forces Previously Russian-held, now Ukrainian-held; Territory currently under Russian control
- Date: 9 June 2025 – present (1 year and 3 months)
- Location: Dnipropetrovsk Oblast, Ukraine

The Russian occupation of Dnipropetrovsk Oblast is a military occupation of the Dnipropetrovsk Oblast by Russia after the Russian Invasion of Ukraine.

During the initial 2022 offensive, the oblast's capital, Dnipro, was not reached by Russian ground forces, but did suffer heavy damage from long-range missile strikes. Frontline cities such as Apostolove and Zelenodolsk held the line under Ukrainian control, though they were later subjected to heavy rocket shelling as the front stabilized.

As of 12 August 2026, Russia only fully controls one Ukrainian settlement in Dnipropetrovsk Oblast: Dachne.

A significant settlement was contested from 14 November 2025 to 12 August 2026 – Novopavlivka. The pace of Russian advances in the region has slowed down, mainly due to the inability to cross the Vovcha river in the western axis, and the Solena river in the eastern axis of Russian control in the region.

== Occupation ==
=== 2025 ===
In June 2025, Russian forces entered the Dnipropetrovsk Oblast from the Synelnykove Raion direction, as part of the Novopavlivka Offensive. The Institute for the Study of War (ISW) assessed that Russian forces reached northwest of Horikhove, based on geolocated footage.

On 1 July 2025, the village of Dachne was captured by Russia. However, the Ukrainian side initially denied the presence of Russian forces in the village, as well as the entire oblast. A month from this, Ukrainian forces entered Dachne, and the village would be contested.

On 9 July 2025, Suspilne reported that the Russian forces tried to enter Dnipropetrovsk Oblast through the border settlement of Dachne close to Donetsk Oblast, but failed to do so as the Ukrainian 37th Special Forces Brigade firmly held the positions. Following this, on 24 and 25 July, Russia captured Maliivka and re-captured Dachne.

On 15 December 2025, Russian drones assaulted a railway station in Piatykhatky, destroying large parts of it in the process. According to the official report, no passengers or employees of Ukrzaliznytsia were injured. Train traffic has been restored, and most sections have been powered back.

On 18 December 2025, Suspilne reported that in the Synelnykove Raion of the Dnipropetrovsk Oblast, five military administrations were formed in accordance with the decree of the President of Ukraine Zelenskyy. This was announced by the head of the regional council, Mykola Lukashuk, in his Telegram channel.

In particular, the following administrations appeared in the districts: Velikomykhailivska, Malomykhailivska, Mezhivska village, Pokrovskaya village, Slavic village.

Between 19 and 20 December 2025, Russia attacked the Synelnykove Raion with drones, striking Petropavlivska, Ukrainska, and Dubovykivska communities located within.

On 20 December 2025, 13 settlements in the Synelnykove Raion of the Dnipropetrovsk Oblast have been added to the list of territories where hostilities are underway.

=== 2026 ===
Beginning on 11 February 2026, Ukrainian forces launched a counteroffensive in the border area of Dnipropetrovsk and Zaporizhzhia oblasts, conducting localized counterattacks and later reclaiming over 400 km² of territory as the operation continued through February and March 2026.

The list includes the following settlements of the Dubovykivska rural territorial community: Chaplyne, Dovhe, Zhuravlynka, Zelenyi Hai, Kasaieve, Kopani, Kruten'ke, Novoandriivka, Petrykove, Rivne, Khvyli and Khutoro-Chaplyne.

By 10 March, Ukraine had recaptured most of the Russian-held territories in the Dnipropetrovsk Oblast.

On 12 August, President Volodymyr Zelenskyy reported that 745 square kilometers and 26 villages in Dnipropetrovsk, Donetsk, and Zaporizhzhia regions were liberated. In particular, Maliivka, Zaporizke, and Novopavlivka were officially liberated.

== Control of settlements ==
Name	Pop.	Raion	Held by	As of	More information
Apostolove	16,356	Kryvyi Rih	Ukraine	24 Feb 2022	
Chaplyne	3,655	Synelnykove	Ukraine	24 Feb 2022	See Chaplyne railway station attack
Dachne	121	Synelnykove	Russia	1 Jul 2025	Contested by Russia before 1 July 2025. Captured by Russia on 1 July 2025. Contested by Ukraine since around 6 July 2025. Recaptured by Russia on 24 July 2025.
Dnipro	980,948	Dnipro	Ukraine	24 Feb 2022	See Dnipro strikes
Hannivka	236	Kryvyi Rih	Ukraine	11 May 2022	
Kamianske	229,794	Kamianske	Ukraine	24 Feb 2022	
Kryvyi Rih	612,750	Kryvyi Rih	Ukraine	24 Feb 2022	See Bombing of Kryvyi Rih
Maliivka	161	Synelnykove	Ukraine	12 Aug 2026	Contested by Russia before 25 July 2025. Captured by Russia on 25 July 2025. Recontested by Ukraine since 14 July 2026. Recaptured by Ukraine on 12 August 2026.
Marhanets	45,718	Nikopol	Ukraine	24 Feb 2022	
Mezhova	7,022	Synelnykove	Ukraine	1 Sep 2024	
Nikopol	107,464	Nikopol	Ukraine	24 Feb 2022	
Novomoskovsk	70,230	Novomoskovsk	Ukraine	24 Feb 2022	
Novopavlivka	3,439	Synelnykove	Ukraine	19 Jun 2026	
Pavlohrad	103,073	Pavlohrad	Ukraine	24 Feb 2022	
Pershotravensk	27,573	Synelnykove	Ukraine	24 Feb 2022	
Piatykhatky	18,457	Kamianske	Ukraine	24 Feb 2022	
Pidhorodne	19,336	Dnipro	Ukraine	24 Feb 2022	
Pokrov	38,111	Nikopol	Ukraine	24 Feb 2022	
Prosiana	4,547	Synelnykove	Ukraine	7 Sep 2024	
Synelnykove	30,021	Synelnykove	Ukraine	24 Feb 2022	
Ternivka	29,226	Pavlohrad	Ukraine	24 Feb 2022	
Verkhivtseve	10,081	Kamianske	Ukraine	5 Jul 2022	
Verkhnodniprovsk	16,976	Kamianske	Ukraine	24 Feb 2022	
Vilnohirsk	22,458	Kamianske	Ukraine	24 Feb 2022	
Zaporizke	103	Synelnykove	Ukraine	12 Aug 2026	Captured by Russia on 26 August 2025. Recontested by Ukraine since 14 July 2026. Recaptured by Ukraine on 12 August 2026.
Zelenodolsk	12,874	Kryvyi Rih	Ukraine	27 Apr 2022	
Zhovti Vody	42,901	Kamianske	Ukraine	24 Feb 2022	

== See also ==
- Russian invasion of Ukraine
- Russo-Ukrainian War
- Outline of the Russo-Ukrainian war
- Russian-occupied territories of Ukraine (former occupation marked in italics)
  - Russian occupation of Crimea
  - Russian occupation of Chernihiv Oblast
  - Russian occupation of Donetsk Oblast
  - Russian occupation of Kharkiv Oblast
  - Russian occupation of Kherson Oblast
  - Russian occupation of Kyiv Oblast
  - Russian occupation of Luhansk Oblast
  - Russian occupation of Mykolaiv Oblast
  - Russian occupation of Sumy Oblast
  - Russian occupation of Zaporizhzhia Oblast
  - Russian occupation of Zhytomyr Oblast
  - Snake Island campaign
- Annexation of Crimea by the Russian Federation
- Collaboration with Russia during the Russian invasion of Ukraine
- Russian annexation of Donetsk, Kherson, Luhansk and Zaporizhzhia oblasts
