= Stepove, Velykomykhailivka rural hromada, Synelnykove Raion, Dnipropetrovsk Oblast =

Stepove Степове
- Village
- Location of Stepove within Ukraine and Dnipropetrovsk Oblast Stepove (Ukraine)
- Coordinates: 47°53′12″N 36°27′8″E
- Country: Ukraine
- Oblast: Dnipropetrovsk Oblast
- Raion: Synelnykove Raion
- First settled: 1922

Government
  - Head of Village: Ternovyi Anatoliy Ivanovych

Area
  - Total: 0,047 km^{2} (18 sq mi)
- Elevation: 140 m (460 ft)
- Zip: 53624

Stepove (Ukrainian: Степове) is an abandoned village in the Synelnykove Raion of the Dnipropetrovsk Oblast, Ukraine. The village name comes from the surrounding steppes.

== Geography ==
It is located near the surrounding villages of Novomykolaivka, Berezove and Kalynivske. Near the village flows a drying stream with dams. It is located near the border of Dnipropetrovsk and Zaporizhzhia oblasts. Up until 2020, the village was part of the Pokrovske Raion until it was merged into the Synelnykove Raion. The elevation is 140 meters.

== History ==
Parts of the village were contested by Russian forces during the 2022 Russian invasion of Ukraine.
