= Zaporizke, Velykomykhailivka rural hromada, Synelnykove Raion, Dnipropetrovsk Oblast =

Zaporizke Запорізьке
- Village
- Location of Zaporizke within Ukraine Zaporizke (Ukraine)
- Coordinates: 47°51′12″N 36°31′55″E
- Country: Ukraine
- Oblast: Dnipropetrovsk Oblast
- Raion: Synelnykove Raion
- First settled: 1922

Area
  - Total: 0.08 km^{2} (0.031 sq mi)
- Elevation: 149 m (489 ft)

Population
  - Total: 103
  - Density: 1,287.5/km^{2} (3,335/sq mi)

Zaporizke (Ukrainian: Запорізьке) is a village in the Synelnykove Raion of the Dnipropetrovsk Oblast. It has a population of 45 in 2025. The body of local self-government is Berezivske village council.

== Overview ==
=== Geography and topography ===
The village is located close to tripoint border of Dnipropetrovsk, Zaporizhzhia, and Donetsk Oblast. The terrain is mostly flat with minor hills. Close to the village are other small villages such as eastwardly located from Novomykolaivka and Kalynivske, south-west of Berezove and occidental from Novoheorhiivka. A small pond is found near the north portion of the settlement. The elevation is 149 meters.

=== History ===
==== Russian Empire ====
The village was part of the Ekaterinoslav Governorate.

==== Invasion of Ukraine ====
During the Russian invasion of Ukraine, clashes were reported near the radius of the village. Russian forces most likely managed to occupy the village, but withdrew after a short period of time.

The village is still regularly shelled.

According to Deepstatemap.live, Russian forces have occupied the village since at least 25 August 2025.
