= Prosiana =

Rural locality in Dnipropetrovsk Oblast, Ukraine

Prosiana Просяна
- Rural settlement
- Location in Dnipropetrovsk Oblast Location in Ukraine
- Coordinates: 48°07′01″N 36°22′20″E
- Country: Ukraine
- Oblast: Dnipropetrovsk Oblast
- Raion: Synelnykove Raion

Population (2022)
  - Total: 4,547
  - Estimate (2026): ~100
- Time zone: UTC+2 (EET)
  - Summer (DST): UTC+3 (EEST)
- Postal code: 53610

Prosiana (Ukrainian: Просяна) is a rural settlement in Synelnykove Raion, Dnipropetrovsk Oblast, Ukraine. It is located at the east of the oblast, southeast of the city of Dnipro. Prosiana belongs to Malomyhailivka rural hromada, one of the hromadas of Ukraine. Population: 4,547 (2022 estimate).

== Name ==
According to legend, the name of the station was given by the engineer who supervised the construction. The reason was that "Просо" (Panicum) grew on the site selected for the station.

== History ==
Prosiana was founded in 1884 near the railway station.

In 1882, Steyger Medvedev conducted geological exploration, which revealed reserves of kaolin raw materials in many places.

In 1894, the first kaolin enrichment plant on these lands was built here, and three years later, a small brick factory for the production of refractories was built.

During the Ukrainian War of Independence, from 1917 to 1920, it passed between various factions. Afterwards it was administratively part of the Zaporizhzhia Governorate of Ukraine.

In 1938, it was granted the status of an urban-type settlement.

Until 18 July 2020, Prosiana belonged to Pokrovske Raion. The raion was abolished in July 2020 as part of the administrative reform of Ukraine, which reduced the number of raions of Dnipropetrovsk Oblast to seven. The area of Pokrovske Raion was merged into Synelnykove Raion.

Until 26 January 2024, Prosiana was designated urban-type settlement. On this day, a new law entered into force which abolished this status, and Prosiana became a rural settlement.

== Social sector facilities ==
- School.
- Music school.
- Kindergarten.
- Polyclinic.
- Palace of culture.
- Stadium.

== Economy ==
=== Industry ===
Prosiana has a plant that was once one of the largest processors of kaolin ore in Europe.

=== Transportation ===
Prosiana has access to the Highway H15 connecting Zaporizhia with Marinka.

Prosiana railway station is on the railway line connecting Dnipro via Synelnykove and Chaplyne with Pokvovsk. There is infrequent passenger traffic.

== Famous people ==
- Anatoly Pavlovich Artsebarsky (1956) — cosmonaut, test pilot, Hero of the Soviet Union, was born in the urban-type settlement of Prosiana.
