= Kalynivske, Velykomykhailivka rural hromada, Synelnykove Raion, Dnipropetrovsk Oblast =

Village in Ukraine

Kalynivske Калинівське
- Village
- Kalynivske (Dnipropetrovsk Oblast) Kalynivske (Ukraine)
- Coordinates: 47°51′33″N 36°27′33″E
- Country: Ukraine
- Oblast: Dnipropetrovsk Oblast
- Raion: Synelnykove Raion
- Founded: 1922

Area
  - Total: 0.075 km^{2} (0.029 sq mi)
- Elevation: 130 m (430 ft)

Population
  - Total: 259

Kalynivske (Ukrainian: Калинівське) is a village in the Synelnykove Raion, Dnipropetrovsk Oblast of Ukraine.

== History ==
The village was founded in 1922.

It was affected by the Holodomor in 1933.

== Geography ==
The village is located near the surrounding settlements of Ternove, Berezove, Novomykolaivka, Zaporizke, Novoheorhiivka and is near the tri-point border of Dnipropetrovsk, Donetsk and Zaporizhzhia Oblasts.

The elevation is 130 meters above sea level.

Until 2020, the village was located in the Pokrovske Raion until it was transferred into the Synelnykove Raion.
