= Voronove =

Voronove (Ukrainian: Воронове) may refer to the following places in Ukraine:

- Voronove, Dnipropetrovsk Oblast, village in Synelnykove Raion
- Voronove, Luhansk Oblast, urban-type settlement in Sievierodonetsk Raion
