= Kalynivske =

Kalynivske (Ukrainian: Калинівське) may refer to the following places in Ukraine:

- Kalynivske, Velykomykhailivka rural hromada, Synelnykove Raion, Dnipropetrovsk Oblast, village in Velykomykhailivka rural hromada, Synelnykove Raion, Dnipropetrovsk Oblast
- Kalynivske, Kherson Oblast, village in Beryslav Raion, Kherson Oblast
