= Nove Zaporizhzhia =

Nove Zaporizhzhia (Ukrainian: Нове Запоріжжя) is a Ukrainian place name which can refer to two villages in Zaporizhzhia Oblast:

- Nove Zaporizhzhia, Polohy Raion, Zaporizhzhia Oblast, village
- Nove Zaporizhzhia, Zaporizhzhia Raion, Zaporizhzhia Oblast, village
