= Mykolaivka rural hromada, Synelnykove Raion, Dnipropetrovsk Oblast =

Mykolaivka rural hromada Миколаївська селищна громада
- Hromada
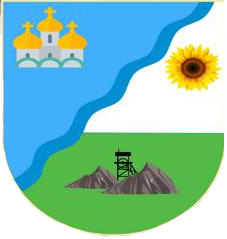
- Seal
- Interactive map of Mykolaivka rural hromada
- Country: Ukraine
- Oblast: Dnipropetrovsk Oblast
- Raion: Synelnykove Raion

Area
  - Total: 459.5 km^{2} (177.4 sq mi)

Population (2020)
  - Total: 9,764
  - Density: 21.25/km^{2} (55.04/sq mi)
- Settlements: 17
- Rural settlements: 1
- Villages: 16

Mykolaivka rural hromada (Ukrainian: Миколаївська селищна громада) is a hromada of Ukraine, located in Synelnykove Raion, Dnipropetrovsk Oblast. Its administrative center is the village of Mykolaivka.

It has an area of 459.5 square kilometres (177.4 mi^{2}) and a population of 9,764, as of 2020.

The hromada contains 17 settlements, including 16 villages:

- Bazhany
- Chumaki
- Dmytrivka
- Kardashi
- Katerynivka
- Kuninova
- Malomykolaivka
- Maryina Roscha
- Mykolaivka
- Novoprychepylivka
- Olefirivka
- Petrivka
- Rusakove
- Sydorenko
- Vidrodzhennia
- Zaporizhzhia

And 1 rural-type settlement: Vasylkivske.

== See also ==
- List of hromadas of Ukraine
