= Ukrainian counteroffensive =

Ukrainian counteroffensive may refer to:

- 2022 Kharkiv counteroffensive, September–October 2022, which mostly took place in Kharkiv Oblast but also in Donetsk and Luhansk oblasts
- 2022 Kherson counteroffensive, August–November 2022, in Kherson and Mykolaiv oblasts
- 2023 Ukrainian counteroffensive, June–November 2023, with a southern (Zaporizhzhia and Donetsk oblasts) and an eastern (Donetsk Oblast) direction
- 2026 Ukrainian counteroffensive, February 2026–present, in Dnipropetrovsk and Zaporizhzhia oblasts

== See also ==
- List of military engagements during the Russo-Ukrainian war (2022–present)
