= Rozdory =

Rural locality in Dnipropetrovsk Oblast, Ukraine

Rozdory Роздори
- Rural settlement
- Location in Dnipropetrovsk Oblast Location in Ukraine
- Coordinates: 48°19′43″N 35°42′19″E
- Country: Ukraine
- Oblast: Dnipropetrovsk Oblast
- Raion: Synelnykove Raion

Population (2022)
  - Total: 1,633
- Time zone: UTC+2 (EET)
  - Summer (DST): UTC+3 (EEST)

Rozdory (Ukrainian: Роздори; Russian: Раздоры) is a rural settlement in Synelnykove Raion, Dnipropetrovsk Oblast, Ukraine. It is located on the right bank of the Nizhnia Tersa, in the basin of the Dnieper, east of the town of Synelnykove. Rozdory hosts the administration of Rozdory settlement hromada, one of the hromadas of Ukraine. Population: 1,633 (2022 estimate).

Until 26 January 2024, Rozdory was designated urban-type settlement. On this day, a new law entered into force which abolished this status, and Rozdory became a rural settlement.

== Economy ==
=== Transportation ===
The settlement has access (via Synelnykove) to Highway M18 connecting Kharkiv with Zaporizhzhia and Melitopol and (via Pavlohrad) to Highway M04 connecting Dnipro with Pokrovsk.

Rozdory has a railway station on the railway connecting Dnipro via Synelnykove with Chaplyne; it has further connections to Pokrovsk and Berdyansk. There is infrequent passenger traffic.
