= 102nd Territorial Defense Brigade =

Ukrainian Territorial Defense Forces unit

- Ukrainian: 102-га окрема бригада територіальної оборони
- Active: September 2018 – present
- Country: Ukraine
- Allegiance: Armed Forces of Ukraine
- Branch: Territorial Defense Forces
- Type: Brigade
- Role: Military reserve force
- Garrison/HQ: Ivano-Frankivsk Oblast; MUN А7030
- Nickname: Dmytro Vitovsky
- Patron: Dmytro Vitovsky
- Decorations: For Courage and Bravery

Insignia
- Flag

The 102nd Separate Territorial Defense Brigade named after Colonel Dmytro Vitovsky (Ukrainian: 102-га окрема бригада територіальної оборони ім. полковника Дмитра Вітовського) is a military formation of the Territorial Defense Forces of Ukraine in Ivano-Frankivsk Oblast. It is part of the Operational Command West.

== History ==
=== Formation ===
The unit was formed in 2018 in Ivano-Frankivsk region. On 30 January 2019, the unit began deployment to the brigade level.

Between 27 May and 2 June 2019, the brigade held reservist training in Kalush.

=== Russo-Ukrainian War ===
==== Russian invasion of Ukraine ====
From 14 June 2022, elements of the brigade's 77th Battalion participated in the defense of the village of Krasnopillia near Sloviansk. On 16 June, they were joined by the brigade's 79th Battalion, and also took part in combat near the village of Dolyna. On the same day, other units of the 102nd Brigade were engaged in combat in the Zaporizhzhia Oblast at the villages of Malynivka, Zelenyi Hai, and Chervone.

The 77th Battalion continued defending the village of Krasnopillia against Russian assault operations into late June 2022.

Engineering units of the brigade were used to clear deoccupied areas from unexploded ordnance in July. The brigade also took part in operations near Lyman in September. Units of the brigade took part in combat in Southern Ukraine, being deployed to Zaporizhzhia Oblast in September 2022. On 14 October, the brigade received its battle flag. In January 2023 units of the brigade were training in Zaporizhzhia area. Medics of the 78th Territorial Defense Battalion were serving in Huliaipole in February 2023.

On 6 December 2024 the unit was awarded the honorary award For Courage and Bravery by the President of Ukraine Volodymyr Zelenskyy.

In November 2025, the brigade took part in the defense of Huliaipole. One of the unit's battalions lost command and control and retreated without orders after Russian troops outflanked the brigade's positions. This resulted in friendly fire incidents with the 225th Separate Assault Battalion, which was sent as reinforcements.

== Structure ==
As of 2022 the brigade's structure is as follows:

- Headquarters
- 74th Territorial Defense Battalion (Yabluniv)
- 75th Territorial Defense Battalion (Lysets)
- 76th Territorial Defense Battalion (Nadvirna) MUN А7135
- 77th Territorial Defense Battalion (Hvizdets)
- 78th Territorial Defense Battalion (Ivano-Frankivsk) MUN А7154
- 79th Territorial Defense Battalion (Kalush) MUN А7166
- 201st Territorial Defense Battalion (Verkhovyna)
- Counter-Sabotage Company
- Engineering Company
- Communication Company
- Logistics Company
- Mortar Battery

== Commanders ==
- Colonel Yurii Kopadze August 2021 – October 2022
- Colonel Volodymyr Lohvinenko October 2022 – present

== See also ==
- Territorial Defense Forces of the Armed Forces of Ukraine
