= Shandryholove =

Village in Donetsk Oblast, Ukraine

Shandryholove Шандриголове
- Village
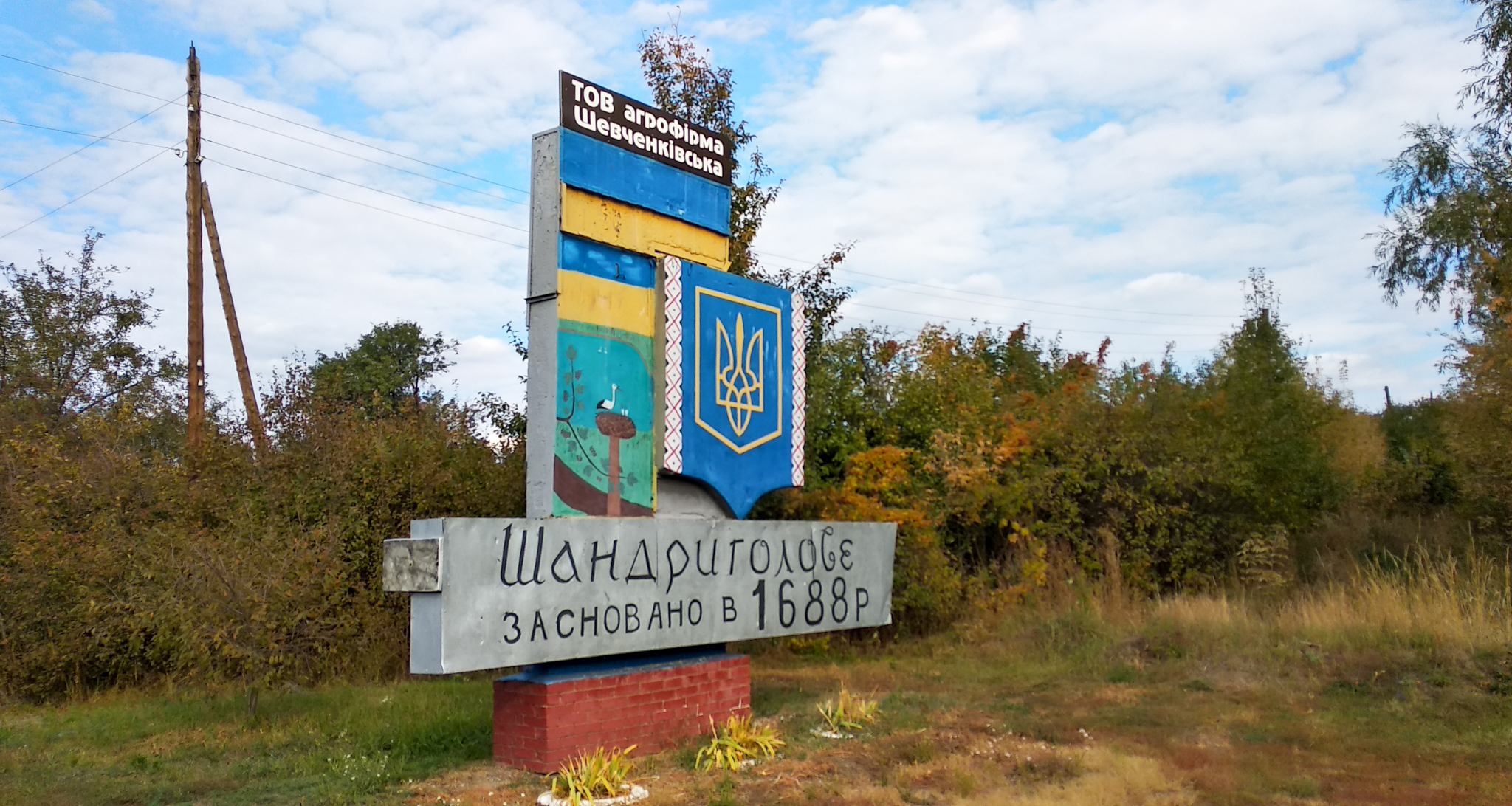
- Interactive map of Shandryholove
- Location of Shandryholove within Ukraine Shandryholove (Ukraine)
- Coordinates: 49.100778°N 37.722139°E
- Country: Ukraine
- Oblast: Donetsk Oblast
- Raion: Kramatorsk Raion
- Founded: 1688

Area
  - Total: 0.17 km^{2} (0.066 sq mi)
- Elevation: 77 m (253 ft)

Population (2001 census)
  - Total: 1,035
  - Density: 6,100/km^{2} (16,000/sq mi)
- Time zone: UTC+2 (EET)
  - Summer (DST): UTC+3 (EEST)
- Postal code: 84430
- Area code: +380 6261

Shandryholove (Ukrainian: Шандриголове) is a village in Kramatorsk Raion in Donetsk Oblast of eastern Ukraine.

== History ==
=== Russian invasion of Ukraine ===
The village came under attack and was captured by Russian forces in May 2022, during the Russian invasion of Ukraine. It was then liberated by Ukrainian forces during the Kharkiv counteroffensive on 29 September 2022.

Russian forces then re-entered the southern part of the settlement on 5 September 2025, during the Northeast Donetsk Oblast Campaign. The Russian Ministry of Defence claimed complete control of the settlement on 29 September 2025, But this was not confirmed by the Institute for the Study of War at the time. A Ukrainian military observer confirmed the fall of the settlement to Russian forces on 17 October 2025.

Russian forces have been accused of committing war crimes in the settlement on 24 September 2025, where videos reportedly show the execution of civilians and the use of a child as a human shield.

During the ongoing Ukrainian counteroffensive on the Lyman front, named Operation Vivaldi, the 3rd Army Corps of the Armed Forces of Ukraine liberated Shandryholove from Russian occupation on September 15, 2026.

== Local government ==
It belongs to Lyman urban hromada, one of the hromadas of Ukraine.

== Demographics ==
As of the 2001 Ukrainian census, the town had a population of 1,035. The native languages in the settlement were as follows:

Native languages in Shandryholove
	percent
Ukrainian	91.01%
Russian	8.31%
Armenian	0.39%
Moldovian	0.10%
Others	0.19%
