= Yavornytske =

Rural locality in Dnipropetrovsk Oblast, Ukraine

Yavornytske Яворницьке
- Rural settlement
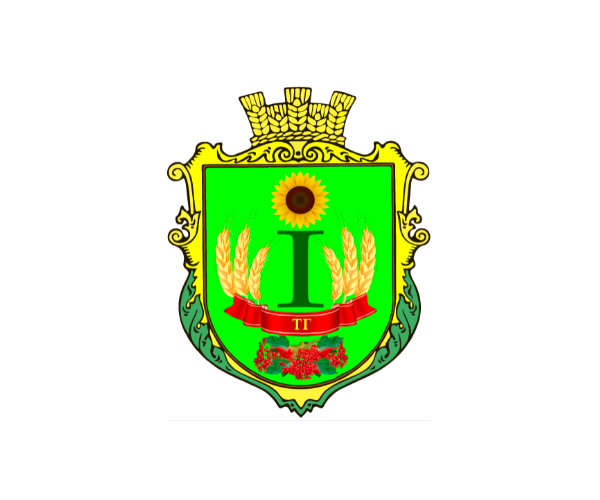
- Seal

- Location in Dnipropetrovsk Oblast Location in Ukraine
- Coordinates: 48°24′33″N 35°16′31″E
- Country: Ukraine
- Oblast: Dnipropetrovsk Oblast
- Raion: Synelnykove Raion
- Hromada: Yavornytske settlement hromada

Population (2022)
  - Total: 8,610
  - Estimate: 8,495
- Time zone: UTC+2 (EET)
  - Summer (DST): UTC+3 (EEST)

Yavornytske (Ukrainian: Яворницьке), formerly Ilarionove (Ukrainian: Іларіонове; Russian: Илларионово) is a rural settlement in Synelnykove Raion, Dnipropetrovsk Oblast, Ukraine. It is located midway between Dnipro and Synelnykove. Yavornytske hosts the administration of Yavornytske settlement hromada, one of the hromadas of Ukraine. Population: 8,610 (2022 estimate).

== History ==
Until 26 January 2024, Ilarionove was designated urban-type settlement. On this day, a new law entered into force which abolished this status, and Ilarionove became a rural settlement.

On 19 September 2024, the Verkhovna Rada voted to rename Ilarionove to Yavornytske. The hromada was renamed accordingly on 26 November 2025.

== Economy ==
=== Transportation ===
The settlement has access to Highway M18 connecting Kharkiv with Zaporizhzhia and Melitopol. It is also connected by road with Dnipro.

Ilarionove railway station is on the railway connecting Dnipro and Synelnykove. There is suburban passenger traffic.
