= Voronove, Dnipropetrovsk Oblast =

Voronove Воронове
- Village
- Interactive map of Voronove
- Location of Voronove Voronove (Ukraine)
- Coordinates: 48°08′47″N 35°15′17″E
- Country: Ukraine
- Oblast: Dnipropetrovsk Oblast
- Raion: Synelnykove Raion
- Elevation: 65 m (213 ft)

Population (2001)
  - Total: 481
- Time zone: UTC+2 (EET)
  - Summer (DST): UTC+3 (EEST)
- Postal code: 52551
- Area code: +380 5663

Voronove (Ukrainian: Воронове) is a village in Synelnykove Raion of Dnipropetrovsk Oblast in southeastern Ukraine.

== Demographics ==
Native language as of the Ukrainian Census of 2001:

Language	Percentage
Ukrainian	88.15 %
Russian	11.64 %
