= Malomykolaivka, Dnipropetrovsk Oblast =

Village in Dnipropetrovsk Oblast, Ukraine

Malomykolaivka Маломиколаївка
- Interactive map of Malomykolaivka
- Location of Malomykolaivka Malomykolaivka (Ukraine)
- Coordinates: 48°26′15″N 36°21′51″E
- Country: Ukraine
- Oblast: Dnipropetrovsk Oblast
- Raion: Synelnykove Raion
- Elevation: 116 m (381 ft)

Population (2001)
  - Total: 249
- Postal code: 52732
- Area code: +380 5631
- Climate: Cfa

Malomykolaivka (Ukrainian: Маломиколаївка) is a village in Synelnykove Raion, Dnipropetrovsk Oblast (province) of Ukraine.

Prior to 18 July 2020, Malomykolaivka was previously located in Petropavlivka Raion.
