= 2026 Ukrainian counteroffensive order of battle =

Order of battle for the 2026 Ukrainian counteroffensive.

== Ukrainian forces ==
Armed Forces of Ukraine

- Ukrainian Ground Forces
  - 1st Assault Regiment
  - 3rd Army Corps
    - 3rd Assault Brigade
      - 2nd Assault Battalion
    - 60th Mechanized Brigade
    - 125th Heavy Mechanized Brigade
  - 66th Mechanized Brigade
  - 425th Assault Regiment
- Special Operations Forces
  - Special Operations Center "West"
- Main Directorate of Intelligence
  - Artan Unit
- State Border Guard Service of Ukraine
  - 10th Mobile Border Detachment
  - Pomsta Brigade
- Ukrainian Air Assault Forces
  - 7th Air Assault Corps
    - 132nd Air Assault Reconnaissance Battalion
  - 8th Air Assault Corps
    - 82nd Air Assault Brigade
    - 95th Air Assault Brigade
- Ukrainian Marine Corps
  - 37th Marine Brigade

== Russian forces ==
Russian Armed Forces

- Russian Ground Forces
  - 20th Guards Combined Arms Army
    - 144th Guards Motor Rifle Division
  - 25th Combined Arms Army
  - 29th Guards Combined Arms Army
    - 36th Motorized Rifle Brigade
  - 36th Guards Combined Arms Army
    - 37th Motorized Rifle Brigade
  - Spetsnaz GRU
    - 14th Spetsnaz Brigade
- Unmanned Systems Forces of Russia
  - Center for Advanced Unmanned Technologies "Rubicon"
