= Slavhorod =

Rural locality in Dnipropetrovsk Oblast, Ukraine

Slavhorod Славгород
- Rural settlement
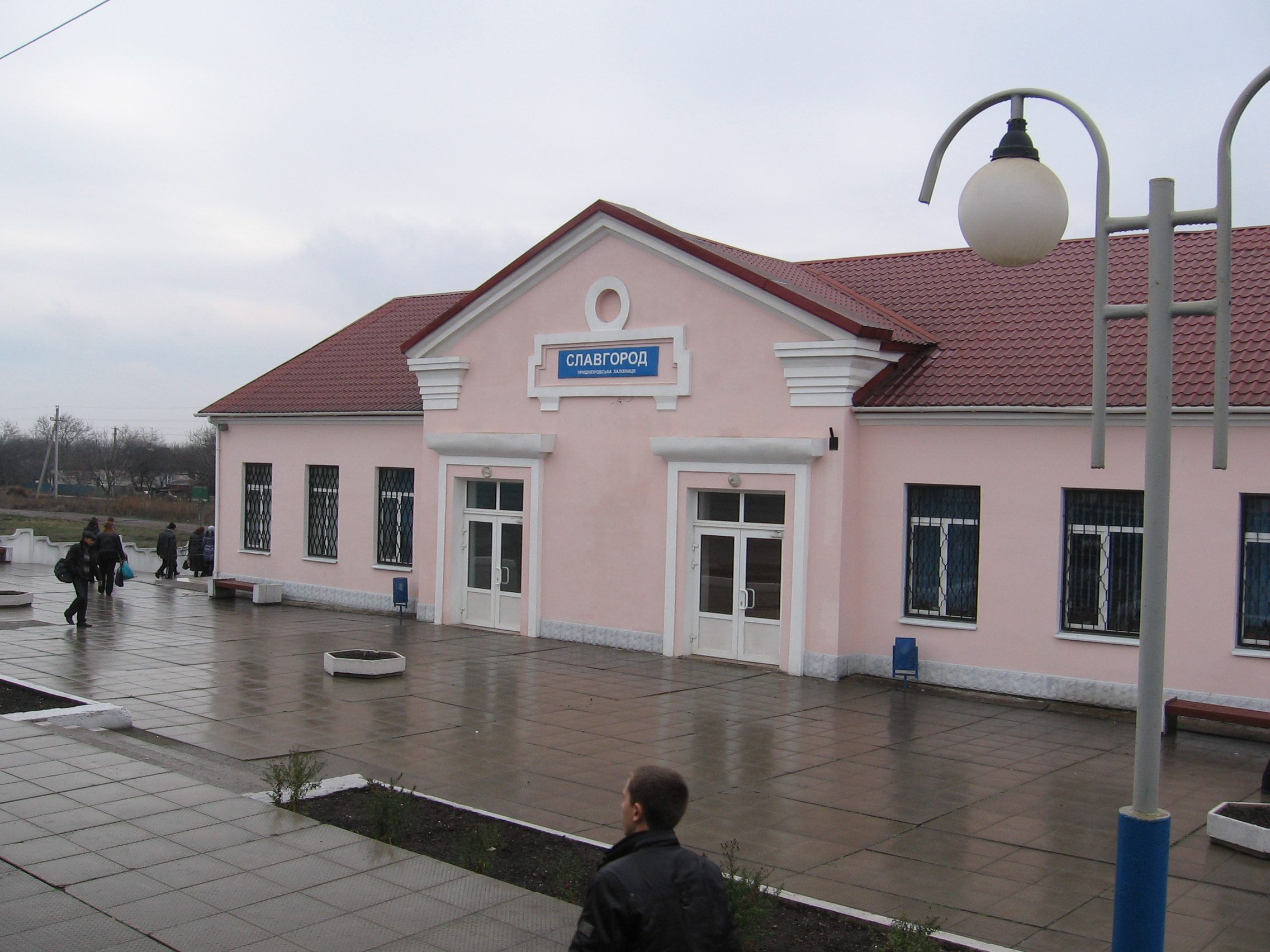
- Slavhorod-Pivdennyi station

- Location in Dnipropetrovsk Oblast Location in Ukraine
- Coordinates: 48°06′07″N 35°31′00″E
- Country: Ukraine
- Oblast: Dnipropetrovsk Oblast
- Raion: Synelnykove Raion

Population (2022)
  - Total: 2,099
- Time zone: UTC+2 (EET)
  - Summer (DST): UTC+3 (EEST)

Slavhorod (Ukrainian: Славгород; Russian: Славгород) is a rural settlement in Synelnykove Raion, Dnipropetrovsk Oblast, Ukraine. It is located on the Osokorivka, south of the town of Synelnykove. Slavhorod hosts the administration of Slavhorod settlement hromada, one of the hromadas of Ukraine. Population: 2,099 (2022 estimate).

Until 26 January 2024, Slavhorod was designated urban-type settlement. On this day, a new law entered into force which abolished this status, and Slavhorod became a rural settlement.

== Economy ==
=== Transportation ===
The settlement has access to Highway M18 connecting Kharkiv with Zaporizhzhia and Melitopol.

Slavhorod-Pivdennyi railway station, in the northern part of the settlement, is on the railway connecting Synelnykove with Zaporizhzhia via Vilniansk. There is infrequent passenger traffic.
