= 2022 Chaplyne railway station attack =

Missile attack by Russian forces in Ukraine

Chaplyne railway station attack
- Part of the Eastern Ukraine campaign
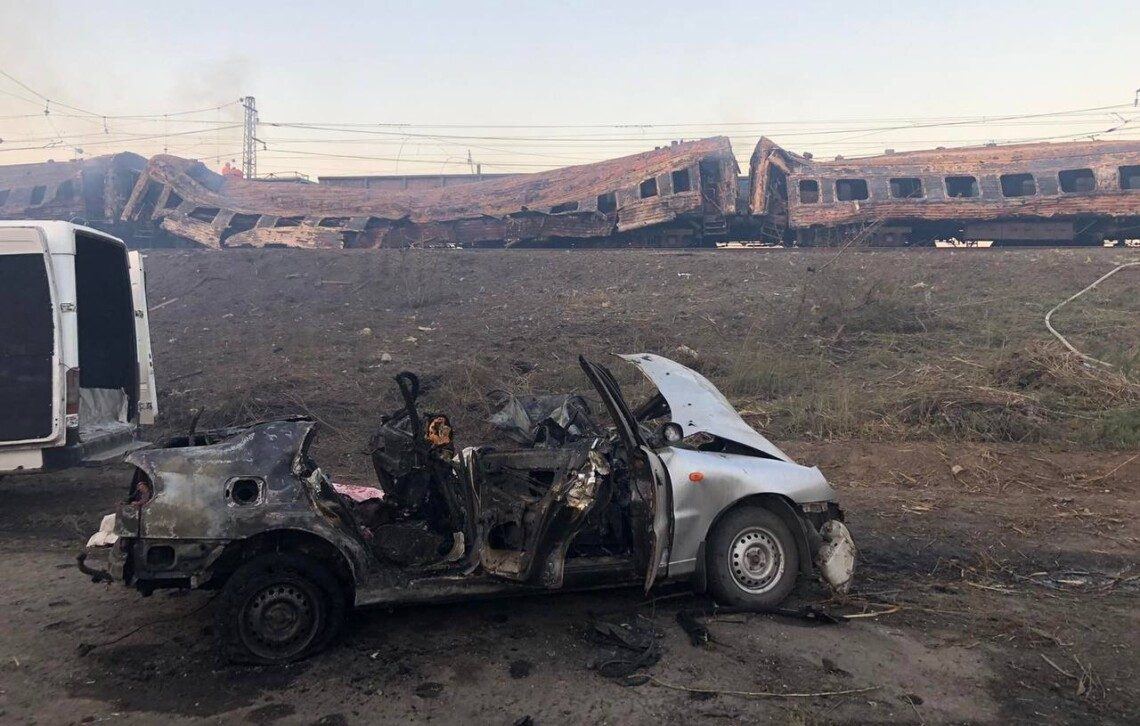
- Aftermath of the attack in Chaplyne
- Type: Missile strike
- Location: Chaplyne, Ukraine; 48.127°N 36.234°E
- Date: 24 August 2022 (UTC+3)
- Executed by: Russian Armed Forces
- Casualties: 25 killed 31 injured
- Location within Ukraine

On 24 August 2022, the Independence Day of Ukraine, a railway station in Chaplyne, Dnipropetrovsk Oblast, was shelled by the Russian Armed Forces resulting in at least 25 dead (including two children aged 6 and 11) and about 31 wounded.

== Attack ==
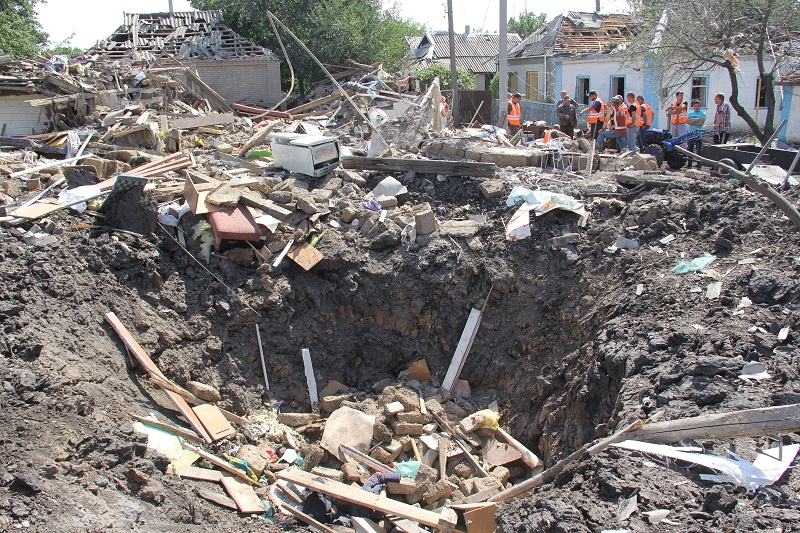
Bomb crater in Chaplyne

On 24 August 2022, Russian troops struck the railway station at Chaplyne, damaging the station, a utility building, and a residential neighborhood. Several passenger rail cars were set on fire and destroyed. Ukrainian sources described multiple rockets or missiles being used in several attacks. The Russian defense ministry claimed it had targeted a military train using a single Iskander missile, and that the attack had killed 200 Ukrainian soldiers.

One rocket hit a private house and buried a woman and two children aged 13 and 11 in debris. Local residents were able to pull the woman and the 13-year-old boy out alive. However, the 11-year-old boy did not survive.

== Victims ==
A total of 25 people were killed and 31 were injured. Of the casualties, five people were burned alive in their car.

== Reactions ==
During his speech at the UN, President of Ukraine Volodymyr Zelenskyy noted: "Four passenger cars are on fire. At the moment, at least 15 people have been killed and about 50 injured. Rescuers are working. But, unfortunately, the number of dead may increase. This is how we live every day. This is how Russia prepared for this meeting of the UN Security Council".

== See also ==
- Kramatorsk railway station attack
- Timeline of the 2022 Russian invasion of Ukraine
