= Maliivka, Dnipropetrovsk Oblast =

Village in Dnipropetrovsk Oblast, Ukraine

Maliivka Маліївка
- Village
- Interactive map of Maliivka
- Location of Maliivka Maliivka (Ukraine)
- Coordinates: 47°55′22″N 36°37′16″E
- Country: Ukraine
- Oblast: Dnipropetrovsk Oblast
- Raion: Synelnykove Raion
- Hromada: Velykomykhailivka rural hromada
- Elevation: 141 m (463 ft)

Population (2001)
  - Total: 161
- Time zone: UTC+2
  - Summer (DST): UTC+3
- Postal code: 53623
- Area code: +380 5638

Maliivka (Ukrainian: Маліївка) is a village with a population of 161 people, located in the Synelnykove Raion of the Dnipropetrovsk Oblast.

== Geography ==
The village is located close to the tri-border of Donetsk, Zaporizhzhia and Dnipropetrovsk Oblasts. It is in close proximity to Ternove. The elevation is 141 meters.

== History ==
During the Russian Invasion of Ukraine, Russia advanced north of Velyka Novosilka and Novopil and engaged in battles near Maliivka.
