= Shakhtarske, Dnipropetrovsk Oblast =

City in Dnipropetrovsk Oblast, Ukraine

Shakhtarske Шахтарське
- City
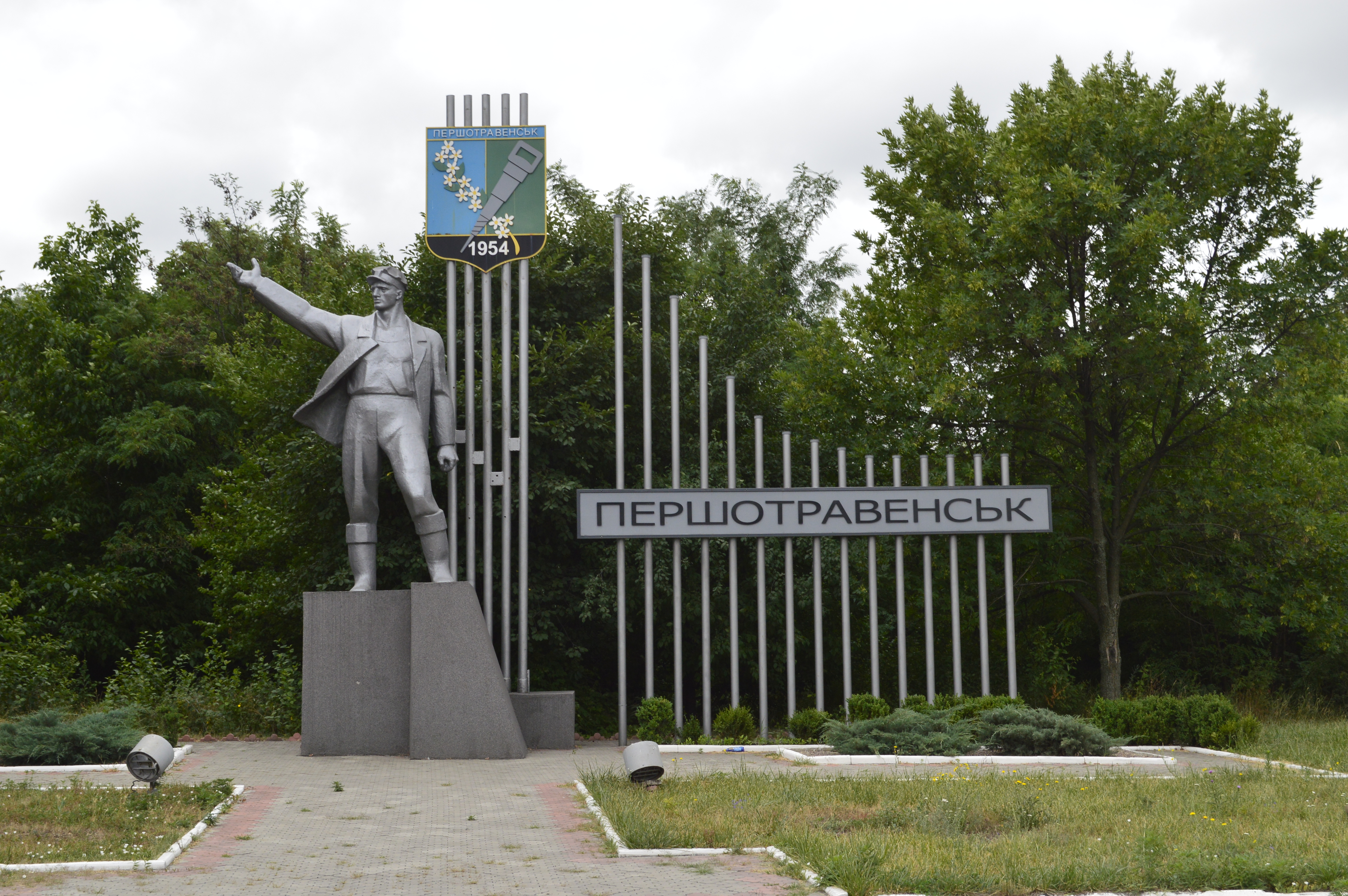

- Flag Coat of arms
- Interactive map of Shakhtarske
- Location of Shakhtarske Shakhtarske (Ukraine)
- Coordinates: 48°20′51″N 36°24′06″E
- Country: Ukraine
- Oblast: Dnipropetrovsk Oblast
- Raion: Synelnykove Raion
- Hromada: Shakhtarske urban hromada
- Established: 1954
- City status: 1966
- Elevation: 132 m (433 ft)

Population (2022)
  - Total: 27,099
- Postal code: 52800—52899
- Area code: +380-5633

Shakhtarske (Ukrainian: Шахтарське [ʃɐxˈtɑrsʲke]), formerly known as Pershotravensk (Ukrainian: Першотравенськ [perʃoˈtrɑwenʲsʲk]) between 1960 and 2024, is a city and municipality in Synelnykove Raion, Dnipropetrovsk Oblast (province) of Ukraine. It has a population of 27,099 (2022 estimate). It is the center of the Western Donbas (Donets Coal Basin) and a satellite city of Pavlohrad.

== History ==
The city has its origins in 1954 as a mining village named Shakhtarske, which grew around mines built in the area, in Pavlohrad Raion, Dnipropetrovsk Oblast. On 6 May 1960, Shakhtarske was given the status of an urban-type settlement and renamed Pershotravensk. It received city status on 26 February 1966. Pershotravensk was also incorporated as a city of oblast significance, meaning that it was subordinated directly to Dnipropetrovsk Oblast instead of to Pavlohrad Raion within the oblast.

On 18 July 2020, as part of the administrative reform of Ukraine, which reduced the number of raions of Dnipropetrovsk Oblast to seven, the city of Pershotravensk was merged into Synelnykove Raion. In April 2023, President Volodymyr Zelenskyy signed the law "On the Condemnation and Prohibition of Propaganda of Russian Imperial Policy in Ukraine and the Decolonization of Toponymy", which mandated Pershotravensk's name to be changed, because it commemorated the Communist International Workers' Day which is celebrated on 1 May (Pershe Travnia in Ukrainian). According to the law, this renaming had to take place before 27 January 2024.

On April 3, the Committee on the Organization of State Power, Local Self-government, Regional Development, and Urban Planning in the Verkhovna Rada stated their support for renaming the city back to its original name of Shakhtarske. On 19 September 2024, the Verkhovna Rada voted to rename Pershotravensk to Shakhtarske.

== Demographics ==
=== Ethnic groups ===
Distribution of the population by ethnicity according to the 2001 census:

Ethnic groups in Shakhtarske
	percent
Ukrainians	60.35%
Russians	35.95%
Belarusians	1.25%
Tatars	0.71%
Germans	0.35%
Armenians	0.17%
Moldovans	0.14%
Azerbaijanis	0.05%

=== Population development ===
Population history
Year	1974	1989	2013	2022
Pop.	23,600	28,068	29,019	27,099
±% p.a.	—	+1.16%	+0.14%	−0.76%

== Notable people ==
- Oleksandr Kubrakov (born 1982), Ukrainian economist and politician
- Viktoria Leléka (born 1990), Ukrainian composer and singer
- Yaroslav Rakitskyi (born 1989), Ukrainian footballer
- Vitaliy Vitsenets (born 1990), Ukrainian footballer
- Artur Zapadnya (born 1990), Ukrainian footballer
