= Novomykolaivka, Synelnykove Raion, Dnipropetrovsk Oblast =

Novomykolaivka Новомиколаївка
- Village
- Location of Novomykolaivka within Ukraine Novomykolaivka (Ukraine)
- Coordinates: 47°50′36″N 36°29′48″E
- Country: Ukraine
- Oblast: Dnipropetrovsk Oblast
- Raion: Synelnykove Raion
- Hromada: Velykomykhailivka rural hromada
- Established: 1921

Area
  - Total: 0.058 km^{2} (0.022 sq mi)
- Elevation: 99 m (325 ft)

Population
  - Total: 155
  - Density: 2,672.41/km^{2} (6,921.5/sq mi)
- Code: 53624

Novomykolaivka (Ukrainian: Новомиколаївка) is a village in the Synelnykove Raion of the Dnipropetrovsk Oblast, Ukraine. It has a population of 155. The body of local self-government is Berezivka Village Council.

== Locale ==
The village used to be in the Pokrovske Raion, until it was liquidified into the Synelnykove Raion. It is located close to Zaporizke and Ternove. A drying stream with a dam flows through the village. The elevation is 99 meters.

== History ==
During the Russian invasion of Ukraine, DPR and Russian forces engaged in battles near Novomykolaivka and its environs.
