= Novopil, Donetsk Oblast =

Village in Donetsk Oblast, Ukraine

Novopil Новопіль
- Village
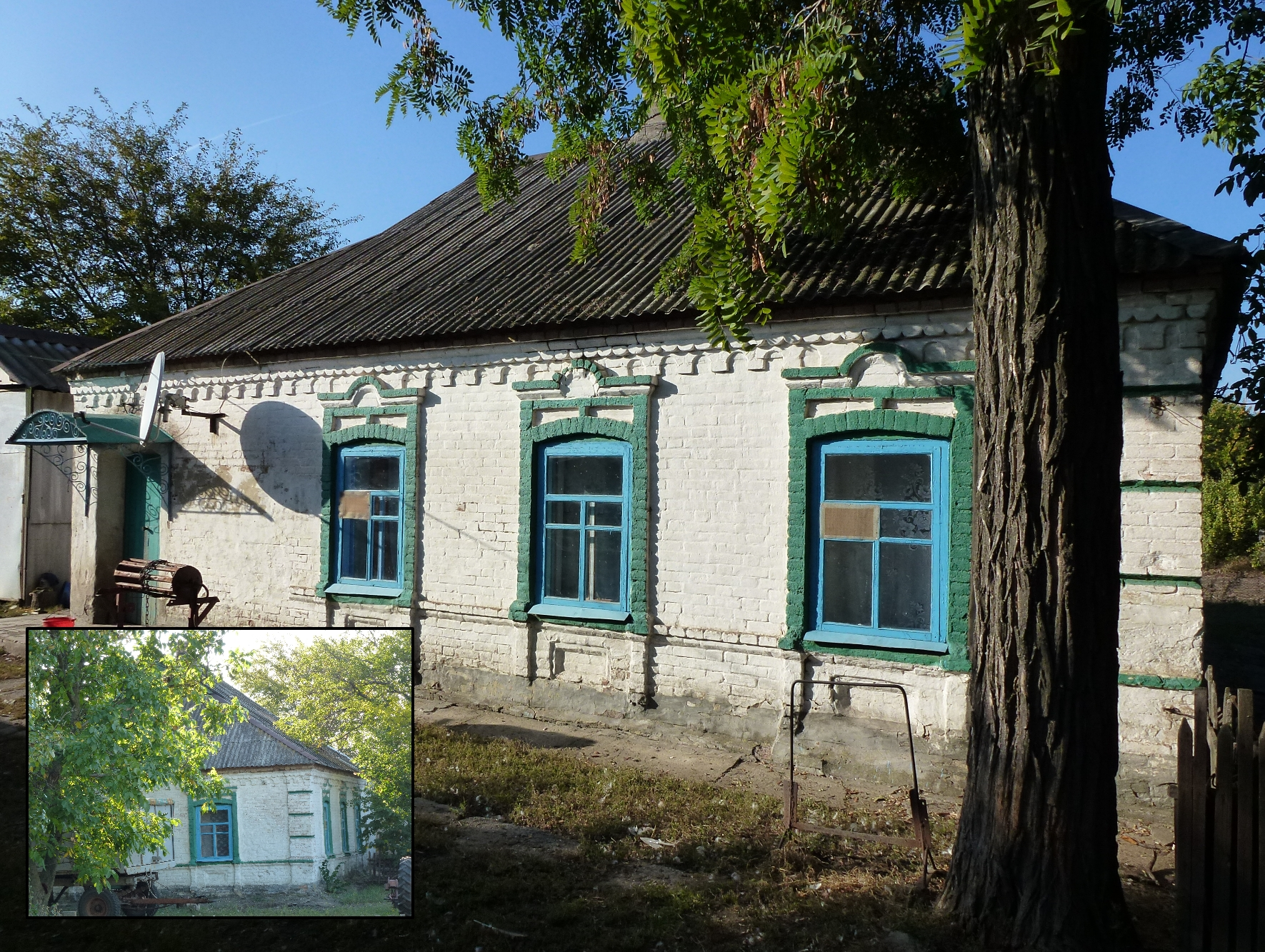
- Interactive map of Novopil
- Location within Ukraine Location within Donetsk Oblast
- Coordinates: 47°48′25″N 36°37′22″E
- Country: Ukraine
- Oblast: Donetsk Oblast
- Raion: Volnovakha Raion
- Hromada: Velyka Novosilka settlement hromada
- Founded: 1888

Area
  - Total: 0.85 km^{2} (0.33 sq mi)
- Elevation: 170 m (560 ft)

Population (2001)
  - Total: 253
  - Density: 300/km^{2} (770/sq mi)
- Time zone: UTC+3 (EEST)
- Postal code: 85525
- Area code: +380 6243
- KATOTTH: UA14040010110095574

Novopil (Ukrainian: Новопіль; Russian: Новополь, romanized: Novopol) is a village in Volnovakha Raion, Donetsk Oblast, Ukraine. The population was 253 people, according to the 2001 census.

== Geography ==
Novopil is located about 3 kilometers from Velyka Novosilka and 6 kilometers from Maliivka. The elevation is 170 meters.

== History ==
The rural hamlet was founded as Neufeld in 1888 by settlers of German nationality of the Evangelical-Lutheran faith.

During the Soviet era, a small number of Germans managed to avoid Soviet deportation. The oldest resident of the village of Novopil, approximately 80 years old, said in the fall of 2011 that her family moved to the village of Novopil to live almost immediately after the deportation of the Germans. In the fall of 1941, 11 Germans lived in the village, apparently hiding in dugouts (she said that these Germans were showing her their dugouts). According to the resident, these Germans left the village of Novopil in 1943 with the retreat of the German troops. This event practically ended the history of the Neufeld zone as a German settlement on the territory of Ukraine.

During the 2022 Russian invasion of Ukraine, the village was occupied on March 9, 2022. However, on May 22, it was retaken from the Russian troops.

In 2023, Russian attacks on the village and surrounding areas were repeatedly repelled by Ukrainian forces.

In May 2025, Russian forces reoccupied the village.

== Composition ==
Up until 2020, the village was part of the Velyka Novosilka Raion, until it dissolved and was annexed into the Volnovakha Raion as part of the raion reforms.

At present, there are many non-residential buildings and unused farm buildings in various degrees of destruction in the village, and wasteland in places where residential houses and farm buildings used to be. There is no school (children, up to ten people, are taken to school in another settlement on a school bus). Asphalt roads within the settlement are in unsatisfactory condition as there are no sidewalks.
