= 141st Mechanized Brigade =

- 141-ша окрема механізована бригада 141-sha okrema mekhanizovana bryhada
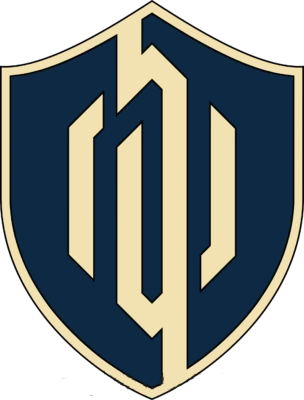
- Shoulder sleeve insignia
- Active: 15 February 2023 – present
- Country: Ukraine
- Branch: Ukrainian Ground Forces
- Type: Mechanized Infantry
- Size: Brigade
- Part of: Operational Command West
- Garrison/HQ: Rivne Oblast, Ostroh
- Engagements: Russo-Ukrainian war; Russian invasion of Ukraine; 2023 Ukrainian counteroffensive; Battle of Robotyne
- Website: Official Telegram channel Official Facebook page Official Youtube channel

Commanders
- Current commander: Col. Shevchuk Bohdan Volodymyrovich.

Insignia
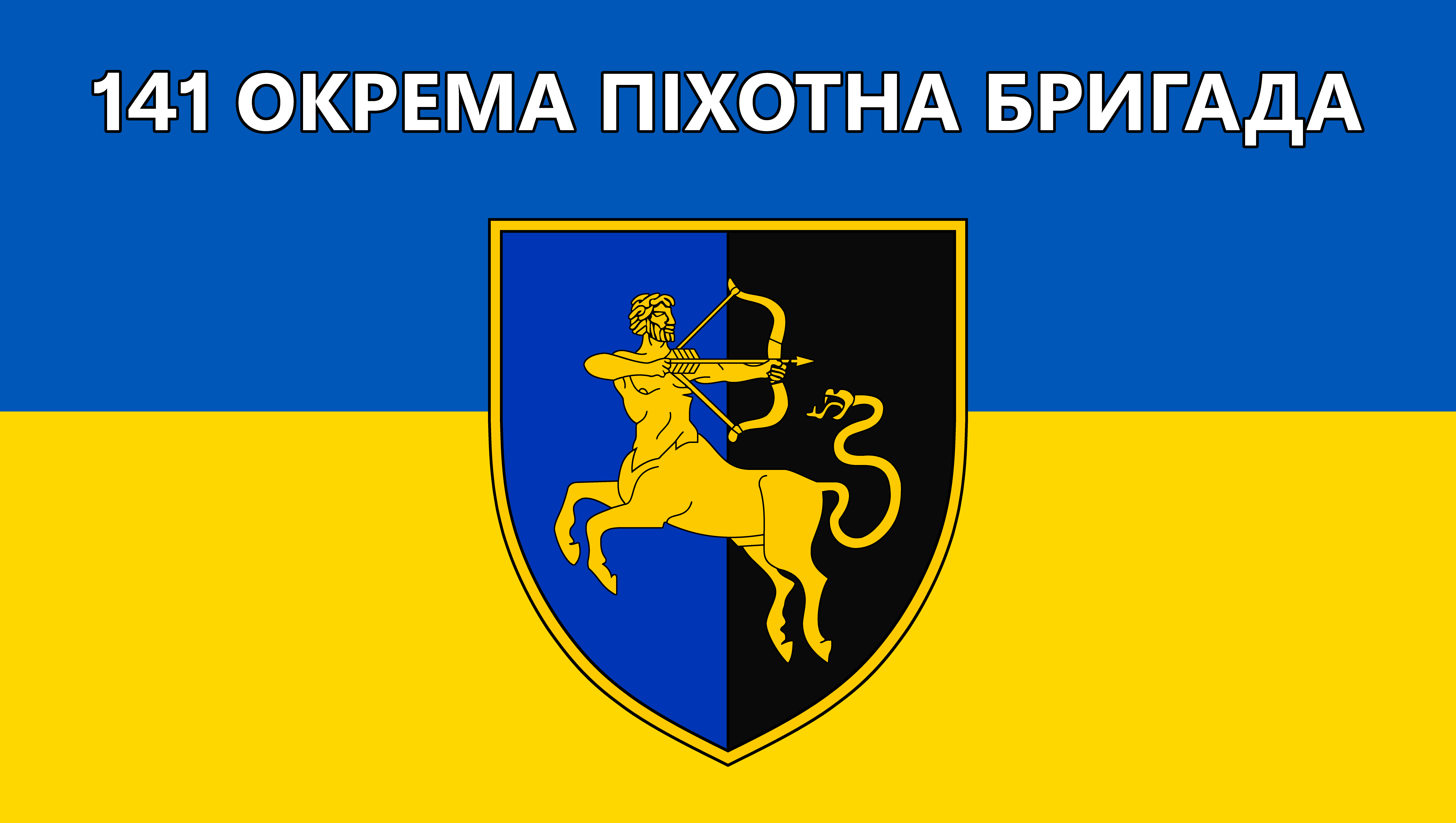
- Flag (until 2025)

The 141st Mechanized Brigade (Ukrainian: 141-ша окрема механізована бригада, romanized: 141-sha okrema mekhanizovana bryhada), is a formation of the Ukrainian Ground Forces formed on 15 February 2023.

The brigade was part of the creation of three rifle brigades, granting Ukraine access to an additional 15,000 troops to reinforce their advance during the 2023 Ukrainian counteroffensive. Originally the brigade was designated as the 141st Reserve Rifle Brigade.

== History ==
=== Formation ===
The brigade was officially created as the 141st Reserve Rifle Brigade (Ukrainian: 141 окрема резервна стрілецька бригада, romanized: 141 okrema rezervna strilecʹka bryhada) alongside two other reserve rifle brigades. According to the Rivne Government website, the brigade was created in Rivne Oblast, in Ostroh and began to undergo training in Lviv Oblast. The creation of these three brigades, including the brigade itself, gave Ukraine access to an additional 15,000 troops, meaning the brigade was expected to fill its ranks with 5,000 troops.

It was reported by Forbes that the brigade was reportedly created by combining six rifle battalions, each being filled with a few hundred troops. These individual battalions—the 451st, 452nd, 453rd, 454th, 455th, and 456th Infantry Battalions—make up the bulk of the brigade's structure.

=== Reforms ===
On 31 August 2023, the brigade made publications indicating that the brigade had in fact been redesignated as the 141st Infantry Brigade (Ukrainian: 141 Окрема Піхотна Бригада, romanized: 141 Okrema Pihotna Bryhada), changing from its previous title as a reserve rifle brigade.

=== Insignia ===
On 31 August 2023 the brigade revealed its insignia featuring a typical shield vertically divided into two equal halves, on the left being blue, and the right being a dark green colour. In the center of the insignia is a golden centaur, depicted with the upper body of a human archer representing the infantry element of the brigade, and the lower body being a horse.

On 1 March 2024, the insignia was first revealed to have changed in appearance, indicated by a flag in use by the brigade, with the right side of the shield's background changing from a dark green to a black colour.

==== Visual insignia ====
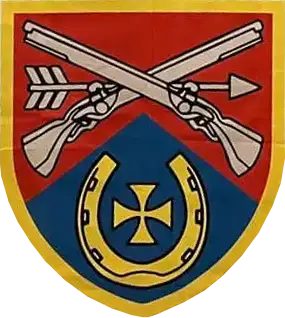
Former Insignia (2023)

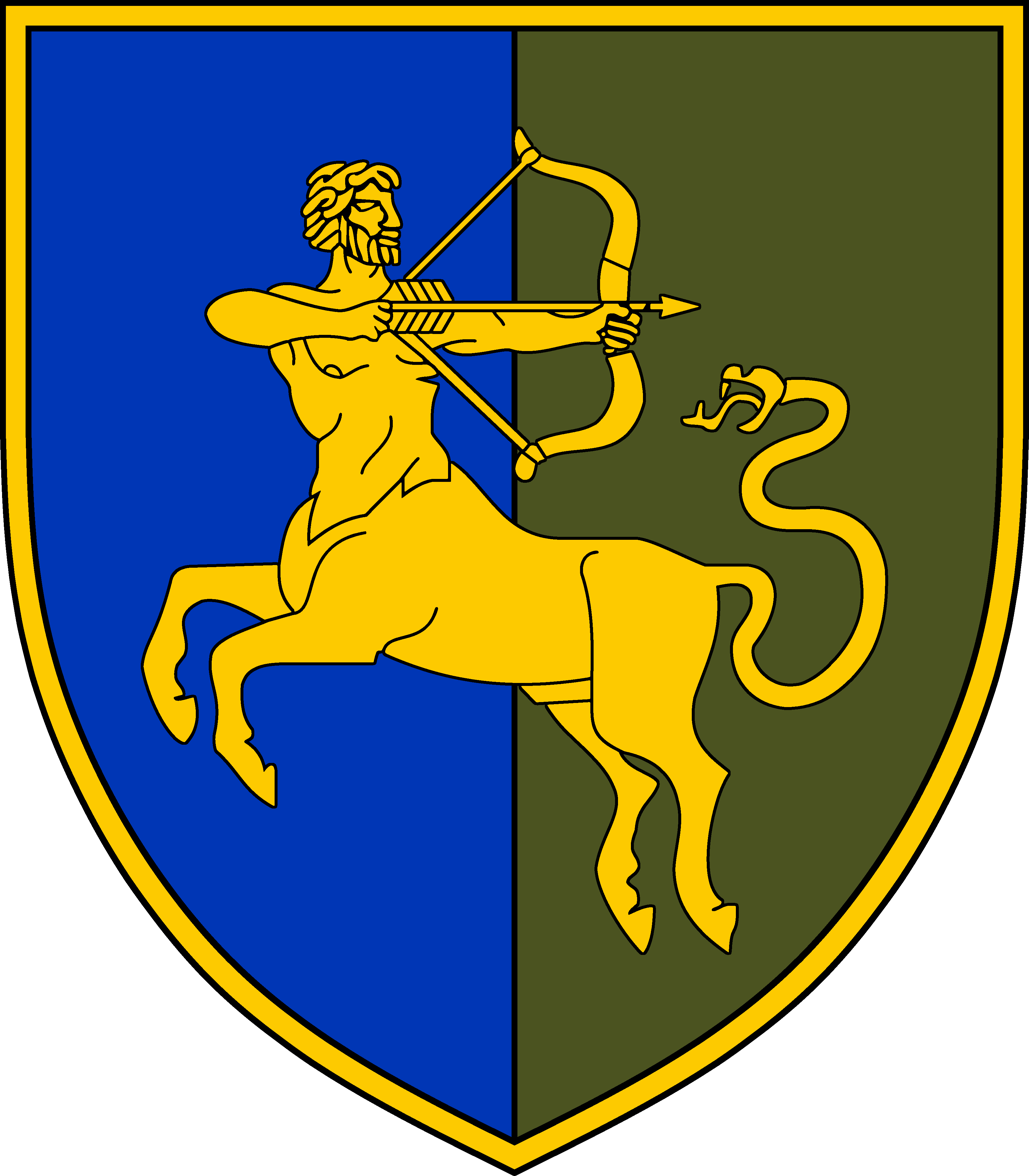
Former shoulder sleeve insignia of the 141st Infantry Brigade.

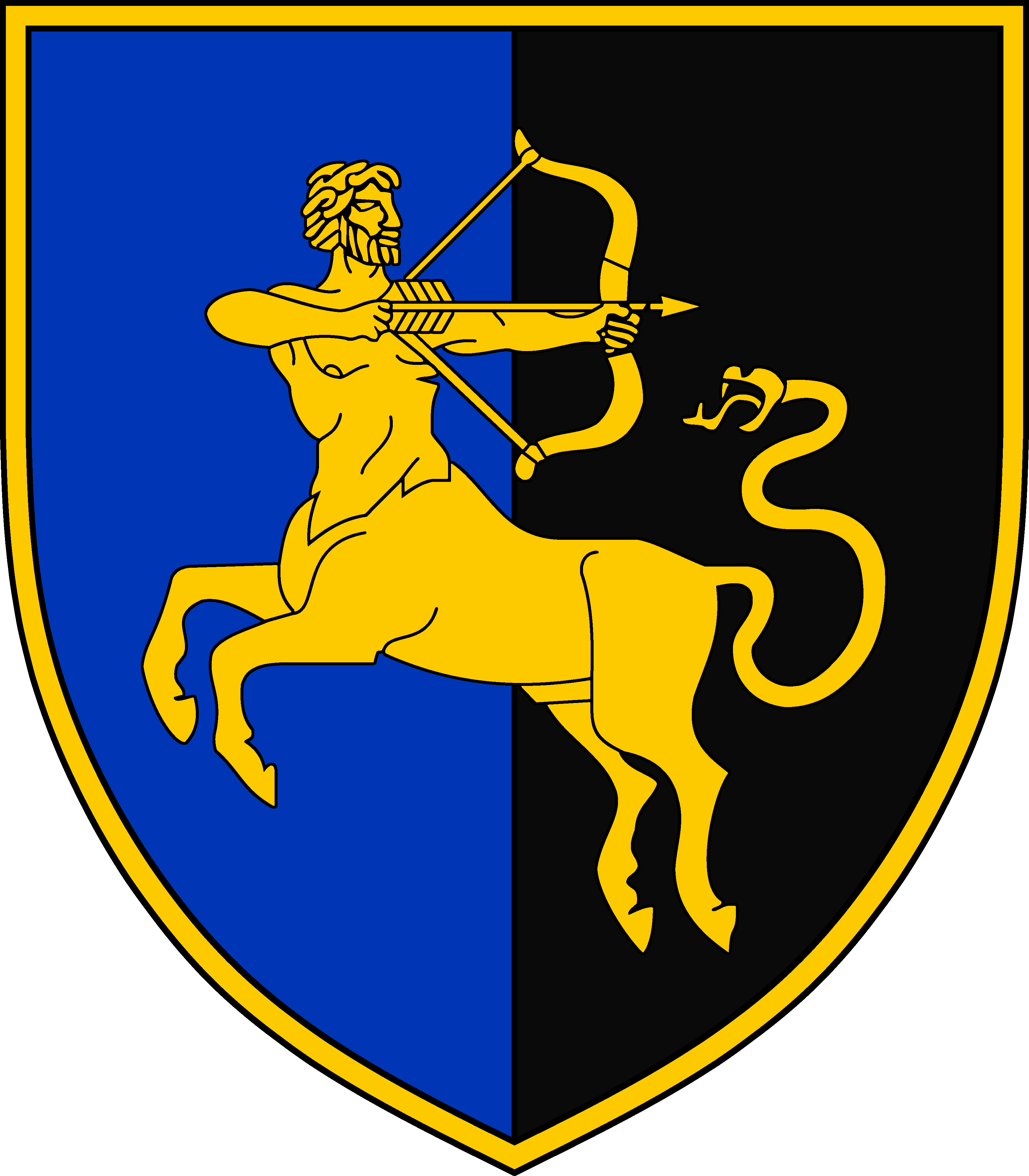
Former shoulder sleeve insignia of the 141st Infantry Brigade (2023–2025).

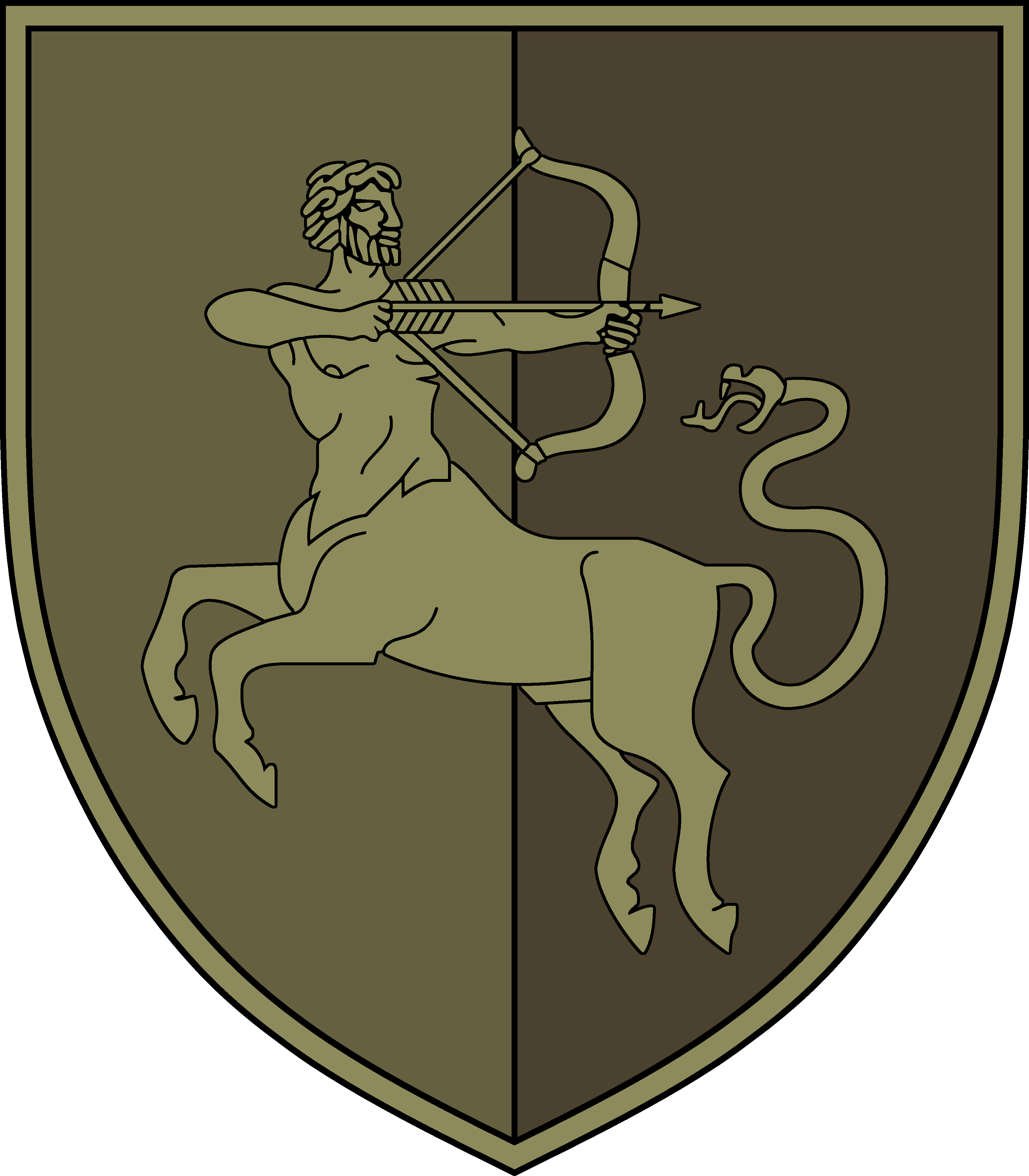
Former shoulder sleeve insignia, subdued variant, of the 141st Infantry Brigade (2023–2025).

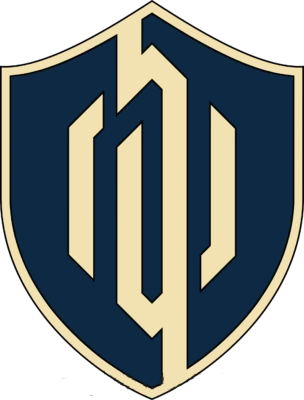
Current Insignia (2025).

== Russo-Ukrainian war ==
=== Russian invasion of Ukraine ===
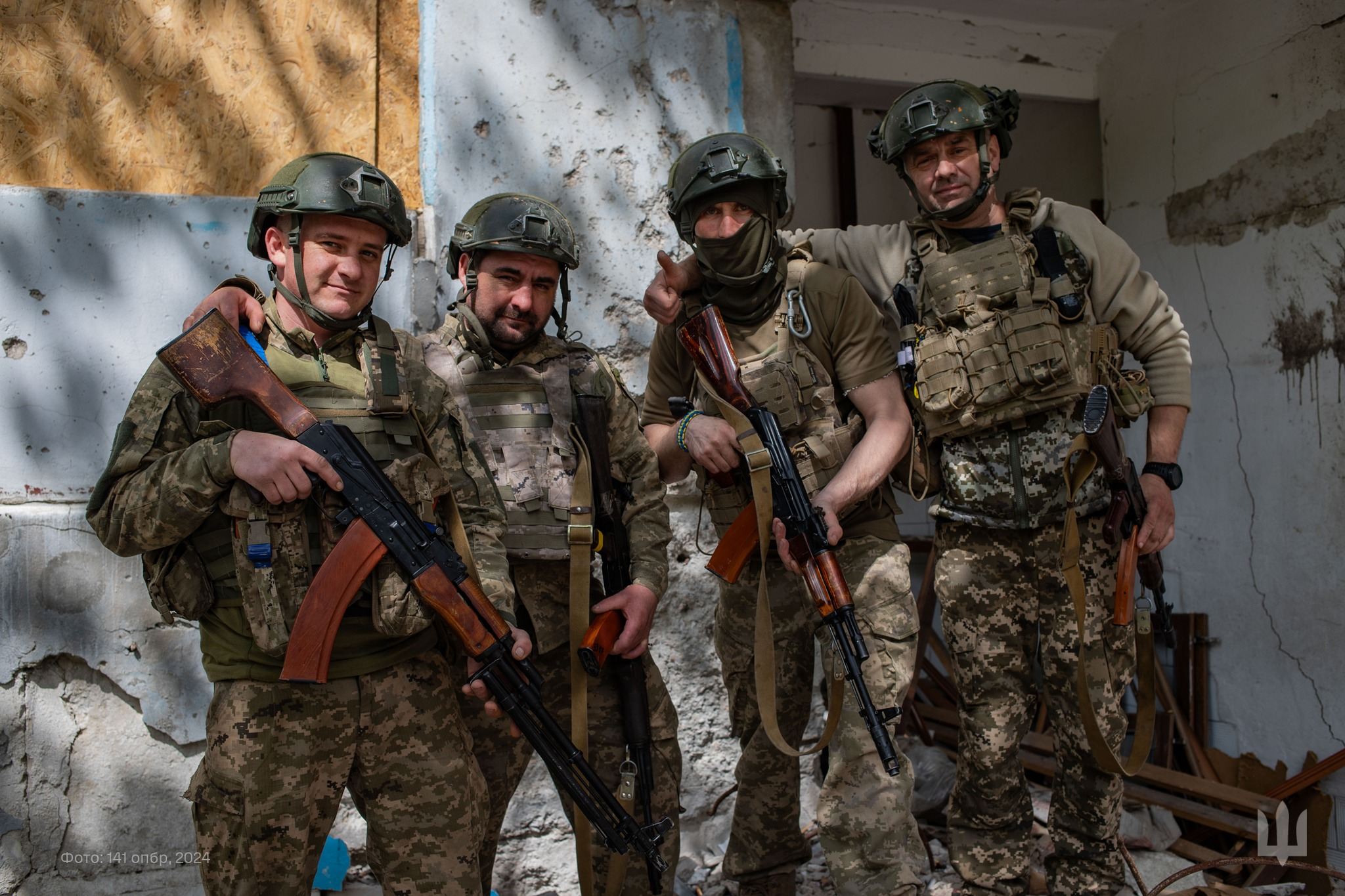
Soldiers of the brigade in Zaporizhia Oblast, May 2024.

==== Defence of Robotyne ====
The 141st Infantry Brigade was deployed to Robotyne, Zaporizhia Oblast in mid March 2024, according to a post by the brigade on Telegram on 16 March 2024 showing Russian infantry being struck by first-person-view drones. Robotyne was considered as an important, and strategic settlement and has experienced heavy fighting for several months, the village was liberated in August 2023 during Ukraine's summer counteroffensive. Since then, the Russian military has made several attempts to recapture the village. Ensuing the village's capture in August 2023, two brigades, being the 65th Mechanized Brigade and the 82nd Air Assault Brigade, remained in order to defend the village, facing daily Russian assaults.

It was acknowledged in an article by Forbes that the brigade lacked supporting forces of artillery gunners, engineers, and were not bringing in fresh tanks to reinforce the brigades defending Robotyne – being the reason as to why the brigade is not designated a mechanized unit much like other Ukrainian brigades.

== Structure ==
As of July 2023, the brigade's structure is as follows:

- 141st Infantry Brigade
  - Brigade Headquarters
  - 451st Separate Infantry Battalion (Mech)
  - 452nd Separate Infantry Battalion
  - 453rd Separate Infantry Battalion
  - 454th Separate Infantry Battalion
  - 455th Separate Infantry Battalion
  - 456th Separate Infantry Battalion
  - 141st Tank Battalion
  - 141st Field Artillery Battalion (soon to be reflagged as regiment)
  - UAV Battalion "Hell's Kitchen"
  - Reconnaissance Company
  - Anti-Tank Company
  - 141st Anti-Aircraft Defense Artillery Battalion
  - Combat Engineer Company
  - Maintenance Company
  - Medical Company
  - Forward Logistics Battalion (flagged for activation)
  - Signals Battalion
  - Military Police Platoon

== See also ==
- 65th Mechanized Brigade (Ukraine)
- 82nd Air Assault Brigade
- 155th Infantry Brigade (Ukraine)
