= Novoheorhiivka, Synelnykove Raion, Dnipropetrovsk Oblast =

Novoheorhiivka Новогеоргіївка
- Rural-type settlement
- Location of Novoheorhiivka within Ukraine Novoheorhiivka (Ukraine)
- Coordinates: 47°52′07″N 36°33′44″E
- Country: Ukraine
- Oblast: Dnipropetrovsk Oblast
- Raion: Synelnykove Raion
- Council: Berezivka Village Council
- Recognized as an official settlement: 1923

Government
  - Head: Dehtiarev Serhiy Mykolaievych

Area
  - Total: 0.034 km^{2} (0.013 sq mi)
- Elevation: 142 m (466 ft)
  - Density: 999.9/km^{2} (2,590/sq mi)
- Code: 53625

Novoheorhiivka (Ukrainian: Новогеоргіївка), is a village in Synelnykove Raion, Dnipropetrovsk Oblast, Ukraine.

== History ==
The village was founded in 1922.

=== Russian invasion of Ukraine ===
In January 2023 Russian forces shelled this settlement.

== Local Government ==
The body of local self-government is Berezovka village council.

== Demographics ==
There is no population in the village.
