= 106th Territorial Defense Brigade =

Ukrainian Territorial Defense Forces unit

- Ukrainian: 106-та окрема бригада територіальної оборони
- Active: 27 June 2018 - present
- Country: Ukraine
- Branch: Armed Forces of Ukraine
- Type: Military reserve force
- Role: Light infantry
- Part of: Territorial Defense Forces; Operational Command West
- Garrison/HQ: Khmelnytskyi Oblast; MUN А7034
- Engagements: Russo-Ukrainian war: Russian invasion of Ukraine

Commanders
- Current commander: Colonel V'yacheslav Sokolov (2024 -)

Insignia
- Flag

The 106th Territorial Defense Brigade (Ukrainian: 106-та окрема бригада територіальної оборони) is a military formation of the Territorial Defense Forces of Ukraine in Khmelnytskyi Oblast. It is part of Operational Command West.

== History ==
=== Formation ===
On 27 June 2018, the brigade was formed Khmelnytskyi Oblast. The brigade was planned to be composed of older reservists, with more than 2,000 of 41-50 year olds signing up. By November 2018, battalions were actively recruiting reservists.

In August 2019, the brigade held an exercise for 154 officers to increase the overall efficiency of defending critical infrastructure, countering sabotage and reconnaissance units, and waging battles in cities and forests.

By mid-February 2022, the Territorial Defense Battalion from Starokostiantyniv had filled 74% of its positions for officers, sergeants and soldiers. At the same time, residents of Slavuta began to organize their own battalion to add to those already serving in the Brigade.

=== Russo-Ukrainian War ===
Russian invasion of Ukraine

Units of the brigade took part in the recapture of Lyman, losing 9 soldiers. In November, the 88th battalion from Shepetivka was serving in areas of Bakhmut and Sloviansk. On 5 December, the brigade's battle flag was created. Units of the brigade were deployed on the Zaporizhzhia frontline between Huliaipole-Polohy in December 2022.

As of June 2023, the brigade's 88th Battalion was deployed in the Luhansk Oblast near the villages of Makiivka and Ploshchanka.

In April 2024, reconnaissance units of the brigade were reported to be defending positions on the Russia–Ukraine border in the Sumy Oblast.

== Structure ==
As of 2024 the brigade's structure is as follows:

- Headquarters
- 86th Territorial Defense Battalion (Khmelnytskyi) MUN А7179
  - Attack UAV Unit "Roninu"
- 87th Territorial Defense Battalion (Kamianets-Podilskyi) MUN А7180
- 88th Territorial Defense Battalion (Shepetivka) MUN А7181
- 89th Territorial Defense Battalion (Starokostiantyniv) MUN А7182
- 90th Territorial Defense Battalion (Yarmolyntsi) MUN А7183
- 91st Territorial Defense Battalion (Slavuta)MUN А7184
- Counter-Sabotage Company
- Electronic Warfare Unit
- Engineering Company
- Communication Company
- Logistics Company
- Mortar Battery

== Commanders ==
- Colonel Ihor Bihus 2019-2021
- Colonel Valentyn Bihus 2021-2024

== See also ==
- Territorial Defense Forces of the Armed Forces of Ukraine
