= Novopavlivka, Synelnykove Raion, Dnipropetrovsk Oblast =

Novopavlivka Новопавлiвка
- Village
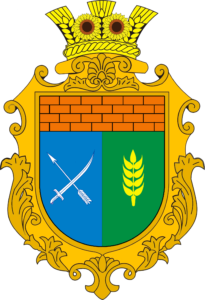
- Coat of arms

- Location of Novopavlivka in Dnipropetrovsk Oblast Novopavlivka (Ukraine)
- Coordinates: 48°08′17″N 36°47′12″E
- Country: Ukraine
- Oblast: Dnipropetrovsk Oblast
- Raion: Synelnykove Raion
- Hromada: Novopavlivka rural hromada

Area
  - Total: 15.01 km^{2} (5.80 sq mi)

Population
  - Total: 3,439
  - Estimate (2025): 150
  - Density: 229/km^{2} (590/sq mi)
- Time zone: UTC+2 (EET)
  - Summer (DST): UTC+3 (EEST)

Novopavlivka (Ukrainian: Новопавлiвка, Russian: Новопавловка, romanized: Novopavlovka) is a settlement in Synelnykove Raion, Dnipropetrovsk Oblast, Ukraine.

== History ==
=== Russian invasion of Ukraine ===
The Novopavlivka hromada was struck by Russian glide bombs in February 2025, causing fires and destroying buildings.

By April 2025, the Institute for the Study of War assessed that Russian forces were making a "concerted push" towards Novopavlivka.

By 15 November 2025, Russian forces have been confirmed to be in the Ukrainian Village
