= Chaplyne =

Rural locality in Dnipropetrovsk Oblast, Ukraine

Chaplyne Чаплине
- Rural settlement
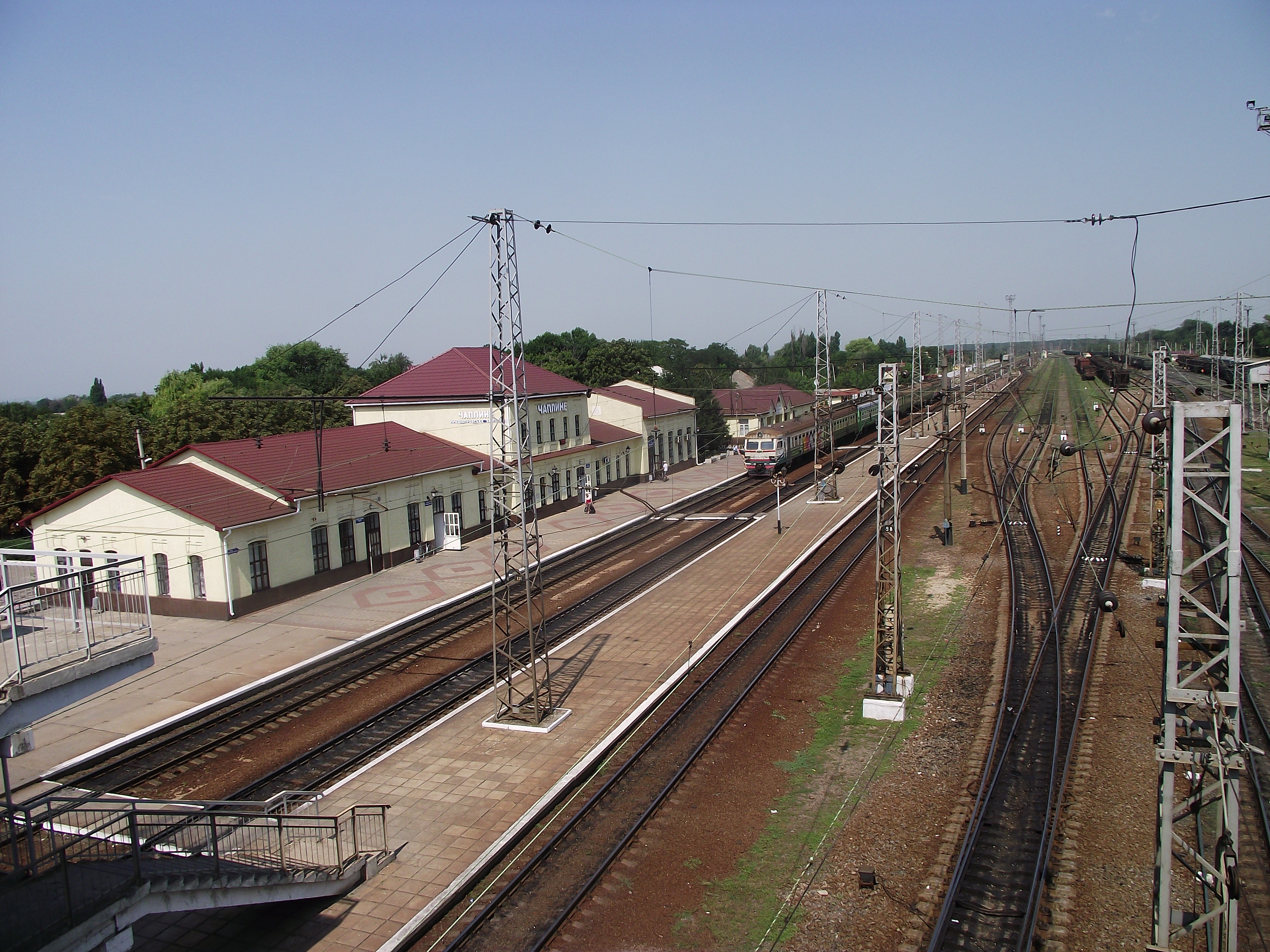

- Location within Ukraine Location within Dnipropetrovsk Oblast
- Coordinates: 48°07′40″N 36°13′55″E
- Country: Ukraine
- Oblast: Dnipropetrovsk Oblast
- Raion: Synelnykove Raion

Population (2022)
  - Total: 3,630
- Time zone: UTC+2 (EET)
  - Summer (DST): UTC+3 (EEST)

Chaplyne (Ukrainian: Чаплине, pronounced [ˈtʃɑplɪne]; Russian: Чаплино, romanized: Chaplino) is a rural settlement in Synelnykove Raion, Dnipropetrovsk Oblast, Ukraine. It belongs to Dubovyky rural hromada, one of the hromadas of Ukraine. Its latest estimated population was 3,630 (2022 estimate).

== History ==
The name of the village comes from the small river Chaplyna, which flows near it.

It was founded at the end of the 19th century during the construction of the Catherine railway (1882–1884), which connected the Donetsk coal and Kryvorizka iron ore basins. It was a part of Oleksandrivsky District of Katerynoslav Province.

After the commissioning of the Chapline-Berdyansk railway branch in 1898, the station turned into a railway hub. From the Ulyanivka station, the track and communication services, as well as the depot, were transferred here.

In 1896, a Belgian company started the construction of the "Ceramics" plant, which accelerated the development of the village and the station. In 1909, 26,000 wagons of bread and other goods passed through the Chapline station.

In 1913, the first educational institution – the railway school – was opened.

With the collapse of the Russian Empire, Chaplyne became part of the Ukrainian People's Republic. In January 1919, during the Russo-Ukrainian war, the village was captured by soldiers of the Red Army, on 15 June by the Russian Volunteer Army. On 30 December, the White Army retreated and the "Red Russians" came. Since then, the village was under the control of the communists.

During the Holodomor organized by Soviet authorities in 1932–1933, at least 16 residents of the village died.

In 1938, Chaplyne received the status of an urban-type settlement.

4 October 1941 — occupied by German troops. Captured by Soviet troops on 10 September 1943. The village and the railway station were badly damaged. At the beginning of 1944, the movement of trains at the station was restored, the depot and workshops were repaired.

In the post-war years, Chapline continued to develop as a railway junction, in 1958 a traction substation was put into operation, and in 1959 – a shop for the production of cinder blocks.

In the 1960s, there were such enterprises in the village as an experimental kapron workshop, Silenergo, an organization for the electrification of villages and collective farms, a meteorological station, a mill, and a butter factory. At the same time, a communications department, a kindergarten, a 10-bed maternity hospital, and a household building were opened. There were also village and railway polyclinics, two schools (eight-year and comprehensive).

Until 18 July 2020, Chaplyne belonged to Vasylkivka Raion. The raion was abolished in July 2020 as part of the administrative reform of Ukraine, which reduced the number of raions of Dnipropetrovsk Oblast to seven. The area of Vasylkivka Raion was merged into Synelnykove Raion.

=== 2022 Russian invasion of Ukraine ===
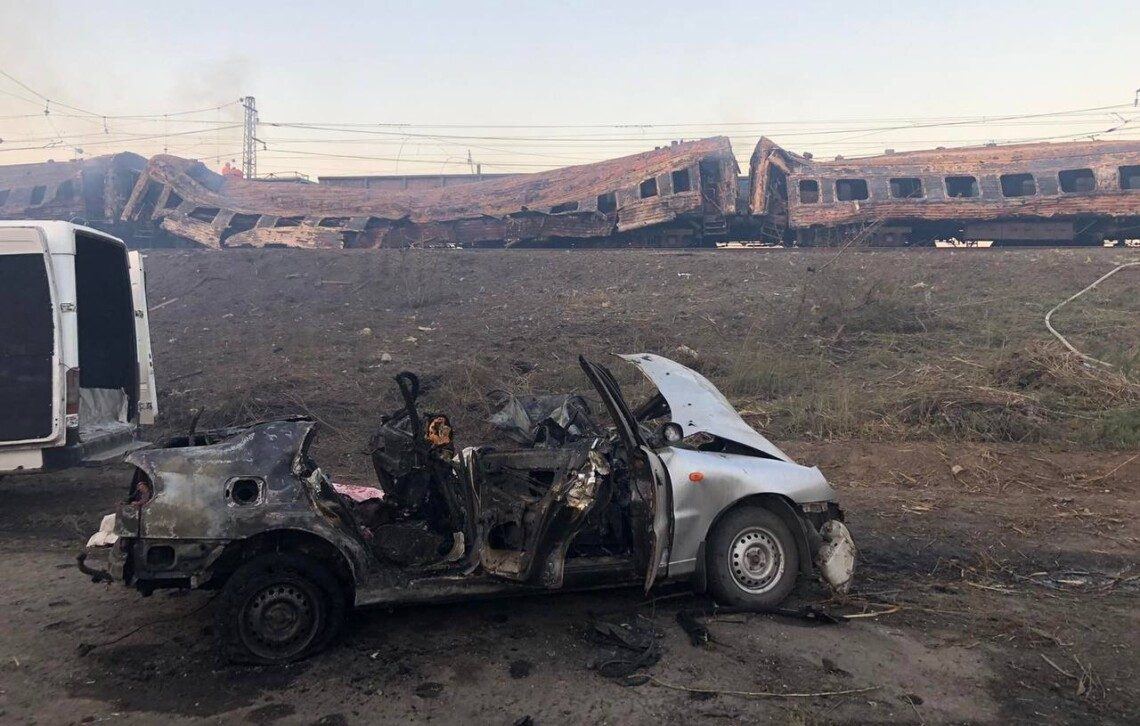
Attack on the railway station in Chaplin

On 27 May 2022, the Russian occupiers attacked a military training ground in the Dnipro district of the Dnipropetrovsk region with three Iskander missiles. About 10 people died as a result of the shelling. Two of them were residents of Chaplyne, Dnipropetrovsk region:

- Yunash Dmytro Anatoliyovych (1988—2022);
- Zhadko Roman Ihorovych (1993—2022).

On 24 August 2022, the Independence Day of Ukraine, Chaplyne railway station was attacked by the Russian military, resulting in at least 25 dead and over 50 wounded. The attack destroyed two private houses completely and damaged another 30.

Until 26 January 2024, Chaplyne was designated urban-type settlement. On this day, a new law entered into force which abolished this status, and Chaplyne became a rural settlement.

== Climate ==
Climate data for Chaplyne (1981–2010)
Month	Jan	Feb	Mar	Apr	May	Jun	Jul	Aug	Sep	Oct	Nov	Dec	Year
Mean daily maximum °C (°F)	−1.1 (30.0)	−0.3 (31.5)	5.8 (42.4)	15.1 (59.2)	21.6 (70.9)	25.4 (77.7)	27.7 (81.9)	27.2 (81.0)	21.2 (70.2)	13.5 (56.3)	5.1 (41.2)	0.2 (32.4)	13.5 (56.3)
Daily mean °C (°F)	−3.9 (25.0)	−3.7 (25.3)	1.5 (34.7)	9.5 (49.1)	15.7 (60.3)	19.5 (67.1)	21.6 (70.9)	20.9 (69.6)	15.2 (59.4)	8.6 (47.5)	1.8 (35.2)	−2.5 (27.5)	8.7 (47.7)
Mean daily minimum °C (°F)	−6.5 (20.3)	−6.6 (20.1)	−1.9 (28.6)	4.7 (40.5)	10.1 (50.2)	14.3 (57.7)	16.1 (61.0)	15.0 (59.0)	10.2 (50.4)	4.7 (40.5)	−0.9 (30.4)	−5.0 (23.0)	4.5 (40.1)
Average precipitation mm (inches)	46.1 (1.81)	37.5 (1.48)	45.2 (1.78)	44.7 (1.76)	51.1 (2.01)	80.3 (3.16)	54.9 (2.16)	43.7 (1.72)	46.6 (1.83)	38.4 (1.51)	48.5 (1.91)	49.7 (1.96)	586.7 (23.10)
Average precipitation days (≥ 1.0 mm)	9.9	7.3	8.4	7.4	7.7	8.9	6.2	4.6	6.1	5.4	7.4	8.5	87.8
Average relative humidity (%)	87.8	84.6	79.5	68.5	65.0	68.4	66.9	64.4	70.6	78.4	87.1	88.6	75.8
Source: World Meteorological Organization

== Economy ==
=== Transportation ===
Chaplyne is on a railway which connects Dnipro via Synelnykove and Vasylkivka with Pokrovsk. There is a passenger railway station in the settlement.

Chaplyne is also included in a relatively dense network of roads of eastern Dnipropetrovsk Oblast. It has access to Vasylkivka and Pokrovske, and from there to Dnipro, Zaporizhia, and Donetsk Oblast.
