= Nove Zaporizhzhia, Polohy Raion, Zaporizhzhia Oblast =

Nove Zaporizhzhia Нове Запоріжжя
- Village
- Location of Nove Zaporizhzhia in Zaporizhzhia Oblast
- Coordinates: 47°49′10″N 36°12′28″E
- Country: Ukraine
- Oblast: Zaporizhzhia Oblast
- District: Polohy Raion

Area
  - Total: 1.51 km^{2} (0.58 sq mi)
- Elevation: 90 m (300 ft)

Population (2001)
  - Total: 103
  - Density: 68.2/km^{2} (177/sq mi)
- Time zone: UTC+2 (EET)
  - Summer (DST): UTC+3 (EEST)
- Postal code: 70221
- Area code: +380 6145

Nove Zaporizhzhia (Ukrainian: Нове Запоріжжя; literally, New Zaporizhzhia) is a village (a selo) in the Polohy Raion (district) of Zaporizhzhia Oblast in southern Ukraine.

Until 18 July 2020, Nove Zaporizhzhia was located in Huliaipole Raion. The raion was abolished in July 2020 as part of the administrative reform of Ukraine, which reduced the number of raions of Zaporizhzhia Oblast to five. The area of Huliaipole Raion was merged into Polohy Raion.
