= Berezove, Synelnykove Raion, Dnipropetrovsk Oblast =

Berezove Березове
- Village
- Location of Berezove within Ukraine Berezove (Ukraine)
- Coordinates: 47°52′25″N 36°29′47″E
- Country: Ukraine
- Oblast: Dnipropetrovsk Oblast
- Raion: Synelnykove Raion
- Village Council: Berezove Village Council
- Based: 1921

Area
  - Total: 0.131 km^{2} (0.051 sq mi)
- Elevation: 147 m (482 ft)

Population
  - Total: 585
  - Density: 4,465.65/km^{2} (11,566.0/sq mi)
- 53624: Zip Code
- Telephone Code: +380 5638

Berezove (Ukrainian: Березове) is a village in the Synelnykove Raion of the Dnipropetrovsk Oblast, Ukraine. It has a population of 585 people.

== Geography ==
The village is located in the Synelnykove Raion, formed from the abolishement of the Pokrovsky Raion, in east Ukraine. The village is located near the tri-point border of Dnipropetrovsk, Donetsk and Zaporizhzhia Oblasts, close to the villages of Novopil, Ternove and Maliivka. The altitude is 147 meters.

== History ==
The village was founded in 1921.

As part of the Russian Invasion of Ukraine, Russian forces seized the settlement on 20 September 2025. In March 2026, Ukraine's Air Assault Forces Command said it had liberated the village.
