= Ternove, Dnipropetrovsk Oblast =

Ternove Тернове Новопетрівьске
- Village
- Location within Dnipropetrovsk Oblast Ternove (Ukraine)
- Coordinates: 47°52′52″N 36°32′06″E
- Sovereign State: Ukraine
- Oblast: Dnipropetrovsk Oblast
- Raion: Synelnykove Raion
- Established: 1922
- Elevation: 147 m (482 ft)

Population
  - Total: 316

Ternove (Ukrainian: Тернове), formerly and still commonly known as Novopetrivske (Ukrainian: Новопетрівьске) is a village located in the Dnipropetrovsk Oblast, in Ukraine.

== Geography ==
The village of Ternove is located approximately 1 km away from much larger Berezove and is close to the joint borders of Zaporizhzhia and Donetsk Oblasts. A drying stream with a dam flows through the village. It has an elevation of 147 meters.

== History ==
The village was founded in 1922. Immediately after the defeat of the UPR, two villages were formed: Ternovy and Petrovsky, named after the "all-Ukrainian headman" Grigory Petrovsky. Over time, the number of villages has increased significantly, and the villages have been united. A village was formed, which the local authorities called Novopetrivske, which was later renamed sometime in 2015 to Ternove. In 2022, Russian troops shelled the village and surrounding areas.

On July 13, 2026 the village was liberated by Ukrainian forces.
