= Pokrovske Raion =

Former subdivision of Dnipropetrovsk Oblast, Ukraine

Pokrovske Raion Покровський район
- Raion
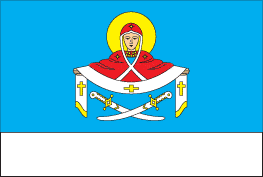
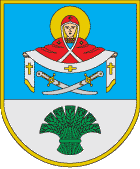
- Flag Coat of arms

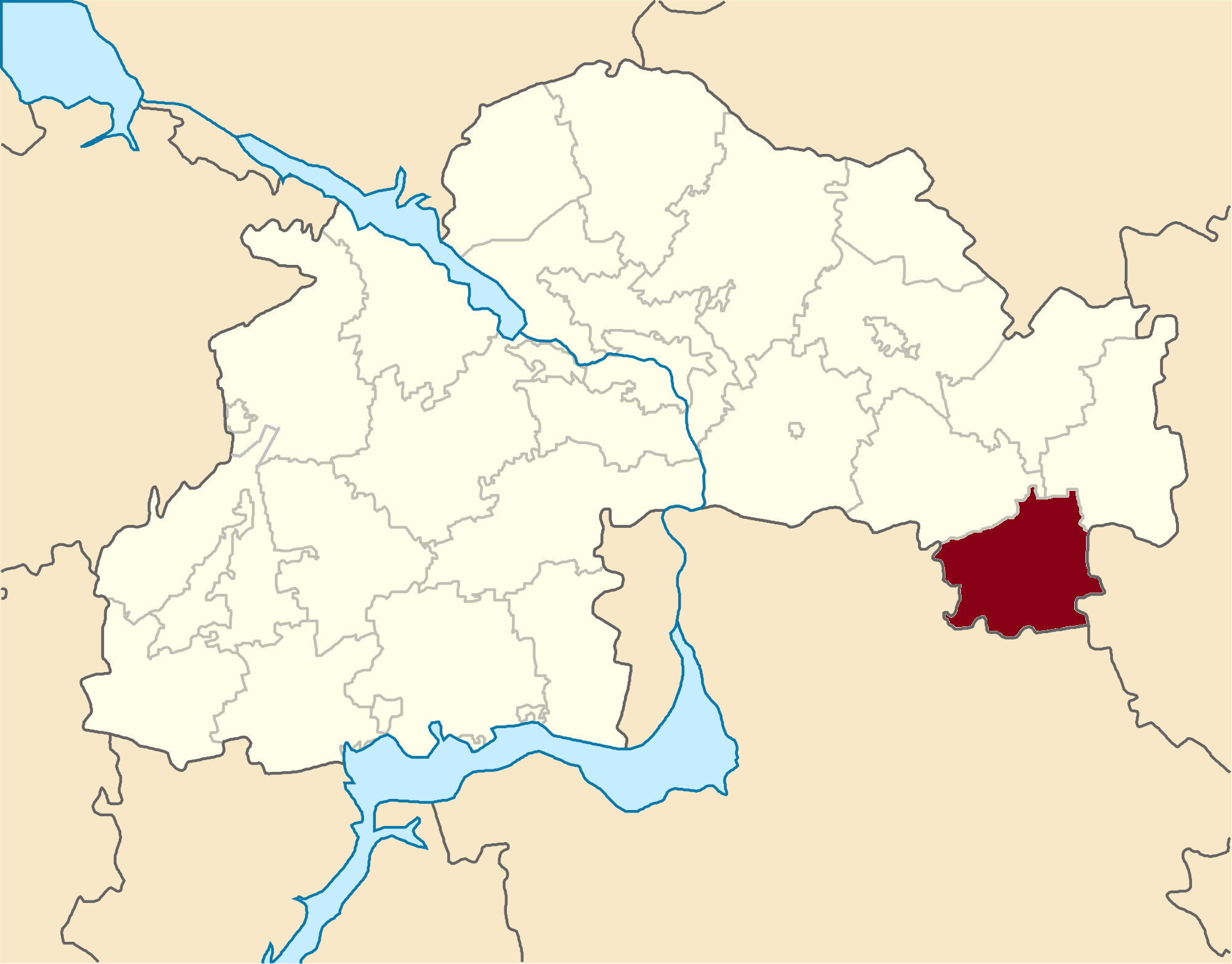
- Coordinates: 47°58′47.6″N 36°13′49″E
- Country: Ukraine
- Region: Dnipropetrovsk Oblast
- Disestablished: 18 July 2020
- Admin. center: Pokrovske
- Subdivisions: List: — city councils; — settlement councils; — rural councils; Number of localities: — cities; — urban-type settlements; — villages; — rural settlements

Area
  - Total: 1,210 km^{2} (470 sq mi)

Population (2020)
  - Total: 42,853
  - Density: 35.4/km^{2} (91.7/sq mi)
- Time zone: UTC+02:00 (EET)
  - Summer (DST): UTC+03:00 (EEST)
- Area code: +380

Pokrovske Raion (Ukrainian: Покровський район) was a raion (district) of Dnipropetrovsk Oblast, southeastern-central Ukraine. Its administrative centre was located at the urban-type settlement of Pokrovske. The raion was abolished on 18 July 2020 as part of the administrative reform of Ukraine, which reduced the number of raions of Dnipropetrovsk Oblast to seven. The area of Pokrovske Raion was merged into Synelnykove Raion. The last estimate of the raion population was 33,124 (2020 est.).

At the time of disestablishment, the raion consisted of three hromadas:

- Malomykhailivka rural hromada with the administration in the selo of Malomykhailivka;
- Pokrovske settlement hromada with the administration in Pokrovske;
- Velykomykhailivka rural hromada with the administration in the selo of Velykomykhailivka.
