= Synelnykove Raion =

Subdivision of Dnipropetrovsk Oblast, Ukraine

Synelnykove Raion Синельниківський район
- Raion
- Synelnykivskyi raion
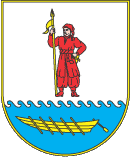
- Flag Coat of arms

- Coordinates: 48°16′N 35°23′E
- Country: Ukraine
- Oblast: Dnipropetrovsk Oblast
- Admin. center: Synelnykove
- Subdivisions: 19 hromadas

Area
  - Total: 6,616.6 km^{2} (2,554.7 sq mi)

Population (2022)
  - Total: 198,974
  - Density: 30.072/km^{2} (77.886/sq mi)
- Time zone: UTC+02:00 (EET)
  - Summer (DST): UTC+03:00 (EEST)
- Area code: +380

Synelnykove Raion (Ukrainian: Синельниківський район) is a raion (district) of Dnipropetrovsk Oblast, southeastern-central Ukraine. Its administrative centre is located at Synelnykove. Its population is 198,974 (2022 estimate).

On 18 July 2020, as part of the administrative reform of Ukraine, the number of raions of Dnipropetrovsk Oblast was reduced to seven, and the area of Synelnykove Raion was significantly expanded. Four abolished raions, Mezhova, Petropavlivka, Pokrovske, and Vasylkivka Raions, as well as the cities of Pershotravensk (later renamed to Shakhtarske) and Synelnykove, which were previously incorporated as cities of oblast significance and did not belong to the raion, were merged into Synelnykove Raion. The January 2020 estimate of the raion population was 36,845 (2020 est.).

Since 1 August 2025, clashes during the Russian invasion of Dnipropetrovsk Oblast of Ukraine are taking place in the eastern part of the raion, with about 200 square kilometers under occupation as of November 2025. This includes territories in the hromadas of Novopavlivka, Pokrovske and Velykomykhailivka.

== Subdivisions ==
=== Current ===
After the reform in July 2020, the raion consists of 19 hromadas:

- Bohynivka rural hromada with the administration in the selo of Bohynivka, transferred from Petropavlivka Raion;
- Dubovyky rural hromada with the administration in the selo of Dubovyky, transferred from Vasylkivka Raion;
- Ilarionove settlement hromada with the administration in the rural settlement of Yavornytske, retained from Synelnykove Raion;
- Malomykhailivka rural hromada with the administration in the selo of Malomykhailivka, transferred from Pokrovske Raion;
- Mezhova settlement hromada with the administration in the rural settlement of Mezhova, transferred from Mezhova Raion;
- Mykolaivka rural hromada with the administration in the selo of Mykolaivka, transferred from Petropavlivka Raion;
- Novopavlivka rural hromada with the administration in the selo of Novopavlivka, transferred from Mezhova Raion;
- Pershotravensk urban hromada, with the administration in the city of Shakhtarske, transferred from the city of oblast significance of Pershotravensk;
- Petropavlivka settlement hromada with the administration in the rural settlement of Petropavlivka, transferred from Petropavlivka Raion;
- Pokrovske settlement hromada with the administration in the rural settlement of Pokrovske, transferred from Pokrovske Raion;
- Raivka rural hromada with the administration in the selo of Raivka, retained from Synelnykove Raion;
- Rozdory settlement hromada with the administration in the rural settlement of Rozdory, retained from Synelnykove Raion;
- Slavhorod settlement hromada with the administration in the rural settlement of Slavhorod, retained from Synelnykove Raion;
- Slovianka rural hromada with the administration in the selo of Slovianka, transferred from Mezhova Raion.
- Synelnykove urban hromada, with the administration in the city of Synelnykove, transferred from the city of oblast significance of Synelnykove;
- Ukrainske rural hromada with the administration in the settlement of Ukrainske, transferred from Petropavlivka Raion;
- Vasylkivka settlement hromada with the administration in the rural settlement of Vasylkivka, transferred from Vasylkivka Raion;
- Velykomykhailivka rural hromada with the administration in the selo of Velykomykhailivka, transferred from Pokrovske Raion;
- Zaitseve rural hromada with the administration in the selo of Zaitseve, retained from Synelnykove Raion.

=== Before 2020 ===
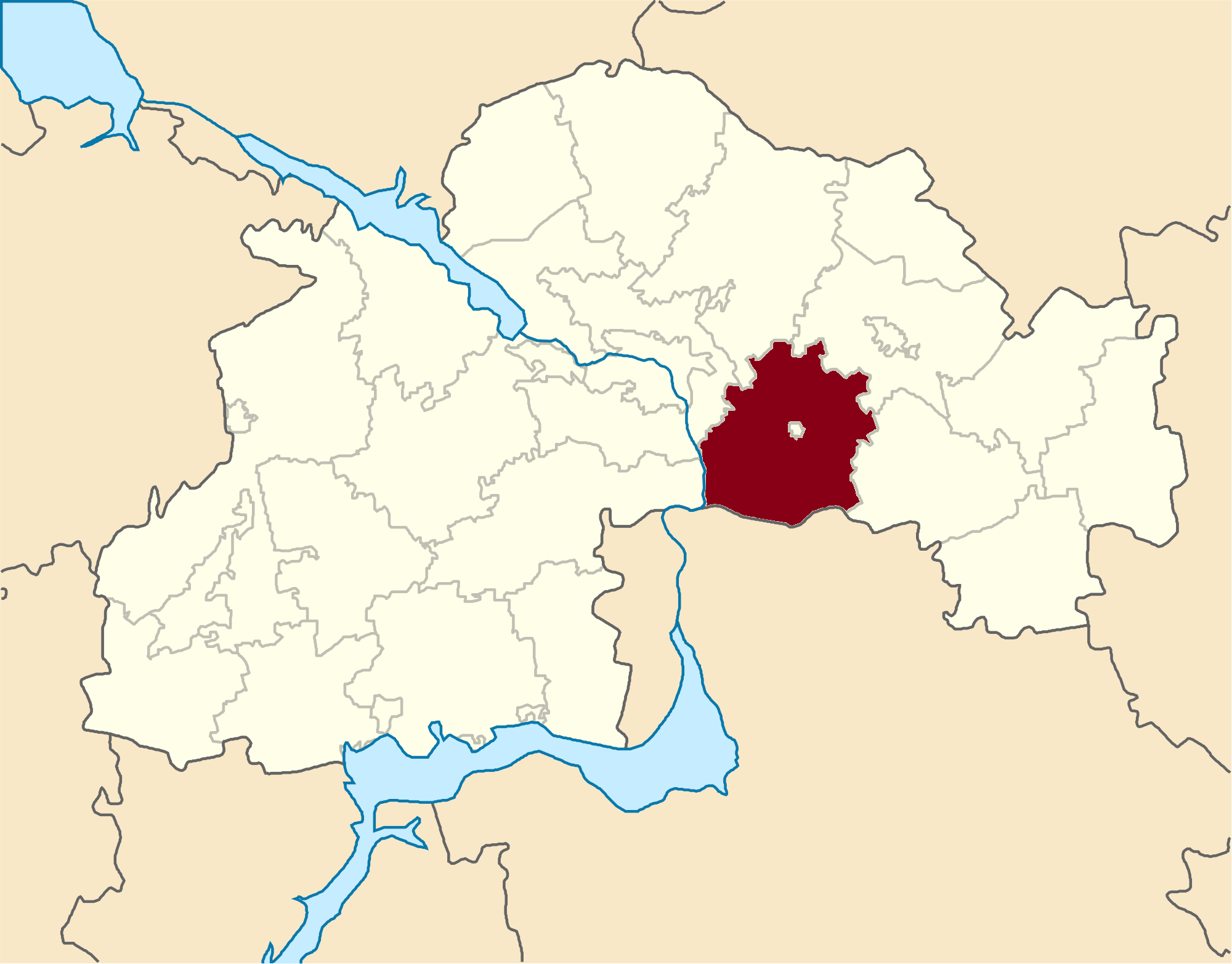
Synelnykove Raion in Dnipropetrovsk Oblast before 2020

Before the 2020 reform, the raion consisted of five hromadas:

- Ilarionove settlement hromada with the administration in Ilarionove;
- Raivka rural hromada with the administration in Raivka;
- Rozdory settlement hromada with the administration in Rozdory;
- Slavhorod settlement hromada with the administration in Slavhorod;
- Zaitseve rural hromada with the administration in Zaitseve.
