= Kindrativka, Sumy Oblast =

Village in Sumy Oblast, Ukraine

Kindrativka Кіндратівка
- Village
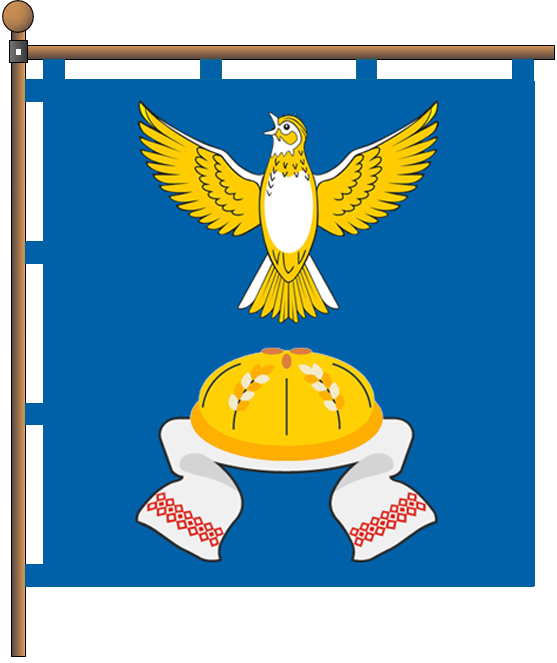
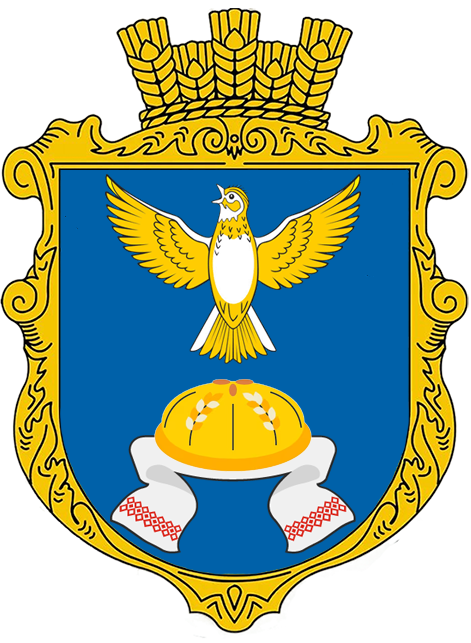
- Flag Seal
- Interactive map of Kindrativka
- Location of Kindrativka Kindrativka (Ukraine)
- Coordinates: 51°8′40″N 34°45′58″E
- Country: Ukraine
- Oblast: Sumy Oblast
- Raion: Sumy Raion
- Hromada: Khotin settlement hromada
- Founded: 1685
- Elevation: 190 m (620 ft)

Population (2001)
  - Total: 852
- Time zone: UTC+2
  - Summer (DST): UTC+3
- Postal code: 42315
- Area code: +380 542

Kindrativka is a village in Ukraine, in Khotin settlement hromada, Sumy Raion, Sumy Oblast, Ukraine.

== History ==
=== Early history ===
It was founded in 1685 by settlers from Pysarivka and Khotyn. The name itself was given by the Khotyn landowner Kondratyev.

Kindrativka was from the second half of the 18th century as the Kondratiev apiary. It became one of the 9 farms of Count Stroganov. The Stroganov estate was located in Khotyn, and therefore most of the first Kindrativka settlers were from Khotyn and Pysarivka.

According to data from 1864, the village of Vlasnytsia in the Sumsky Uyezd of the Kharkov Governorate had a population of 1,124 people (552 males and 572 females).

As of 1914, the village belonged to the Khotyn Volost and the number of inhabitants had increased to 2,293 people.

=== 20th century ===
==== Interwar period ====
In 1929, forced collectivization began.

In 1932-1933, the village suffered from the Holodomor. There is no exact information about the number of people who died from hunger, but the losses were great. Many people were saved by being able to break through the barricades and get to neighboring Russian villages.

==== World war II ====
At the start of the Eastern Front in October 1941, Kindrativka was occupied by Nazi troops, who established their own order in the village. Education at the school was suspended, and the Nazi headquarters was set up in the school building. Many residents of the village were shot as relatives of partisans or for their connections with partisans.

In connection with the battles on the Kursk Bulge, the Germans built a defensive line near the village. A large anti-tank ditch on the Andriivka side has survived to this day. On March 6, 1943, the Germans burned the villages of Andriivka and Zolotarivka.

Many people were shot during the occupation for evading deportation to forced labour in Germany for attempting to cross the front line and violating the occupation regime. In 1942, a Jewish family was shot by German forces: Chaim Moiseyovich Blumenblacht, his wife, and seven children aged 2 to 13.

To activate the partisan movement in Kindrativka and nearby villages, the Soviet command sent a paratrooper scout named Solodovnikov. In 1943, he was shot by a local policeman, Korotenko.

During the fighting for the liberation of the village, its residents were evacuated twice to the villages of Yastrubyne and Frunzenka in the Sumy district. During the retreat of the Nazi troops, the school building was destroyed by Soviet long-range artillery.

The village was liberated on September 1, 1943 by units of the 842nd Rifle Regiment of the 240th Rifle Division of the 51st Rifle Corps of the 38th Army, and the 180th Tank Army.

In 1946, the remains of 47 people who died during the occupation and liberation of the village were transferred to the Mass Grave at the central estate in the village of Kindrativka. The head of the collective farm, M. S. Skoryk, was awarded the title of Hero of Socialist Labour in 1948 for his significant labor achievements.

==== Post-war period ====
Until 1952, the village of Kostyantynivka had its own village council. In 1954, a mass resettlement of Kostyantynivka residents to Crimea took place. However, most families later returned.

=== 21st century ===
In 2003 and 2004, the Kindrativka Village Council, headed by M. I. Toryanyk, took first place in the Sumy district in the competition "The settlement with the best improvement and public order". In 2005, the village council won third place in the same, but All-Ukrainian competition.

On June 12, 2020, in accordance with the Resolution of the Cabinet of Ministers of Ukraine No. 723-r "On the Determination of Administrative Centers and Approval of Territories of Territorial Communities of Sumy Region", it became part of the Khotin settlement hromada. On July 19, 2020, as a result of the administrative-territorial reform and liquidation of the Sumy Raion (1923—2020), the village became part of the newly formed Sumy Raion.

==== Russo-Ukrainian war ====
On May 24, 2024, 1 explosion was recorded in the village from the side of the Russia, probably an FPV drone.

On July 29, 2024, the settlement was once again shelled by Russian troops. Three explosions, assumed to be from a UAV, were recorded.

On August 1, 2024, the village was again shelled by Russia. 6 explosions, presumed to be from a 82 mm mortar, were recorded.

On August 3, 2024, Russian troops shelled the village again. 3 explosions were recorded, probably from an 82 mm mortar; 5 explosions, probably from a 120 mm mortar.

On August 14, 2024, the Operational Command North reported that the Russia shelled the Sumy Oblast. 1 explosion was recorded in the village, probably a KAB.

On August 17, 2024, the Operational Command North reported shelling of the Sumy Oblast. Among the affected settlements was the village of Kindrativka - 1 explosion, probably a KAB.

Russian forces first entered the village on 7 June 2025. Russian forces captured the village by 16 June 2025. On July 8, 2025, Ukrainian forces launched counterattack on the settlement, recontesting the village. On 25 July 2025, Ukrainian military forces states that they had recaptured Kindrativka. On 17 February 2026, Russian forces re-contested the settlement.

== Geography ==
=== Area ===
The area of the village is 495.3 hectares. The area of the village council is 6280.51 hectares.

=== Arrangement ===
The village is located 30 km northwest of the city of Sumy, 8 km from the village of Khotin. In the north, Kindrativka borders the Kursk Oblast of Russia, as well as the villages of Andriivka, Kostiantynivka, Novokostiantynivka, and Yastrubyne. Until 2016, the village council included the villages of Kostyantynivka, Novokostyantynivka and Stepne.

The Filinshchina River, a right tributary of the Muzhitsa River, flows through the village.

=== Landscape ===
Near Kindrativka are the tracts of Rizniki, Miroshniki, Boykiv, Bardash, Tretiy Yar, Chetverty Yar, Vyezne, Stadnytsia, as well as the ponds of Klevenya, Vysochansky, Pshonovsky, and Novy. The territory of the local tracts is a section of the Central Russian Upland, which is represented by loess-sand plains, which indicates that the territory was exposed to the influence of the glacier of the Quaternary period of the Cenozoic era.

== Culture ==
=== Celebrations ===
Village Day is December 19.

=== Architectural and historical and cultural monuments ===
==== Memorial to those who died on the fronts of World War II ====
In 1962, a monument to the soldiers who died in battle with against Axis forces was erected at the Mass Grave. In 1975, a memorial to the dead was built according to the design of architect M. P. Makhonko, where the names of fellow villagers who died in World War II are listed.

In 2005, the memorial to the fallen soldiers was restored, where war veterans are traditionally honored.

==== Memorial to the victims of the Holodomor of 1932-1933 (slab) ====
At the initiative of the local community, on the 75th anniversary of the Holodomor of 1932–1933 in Ukraine, on November 22, 2008, a memorial sign to the victims of the Holodomor of 1932–1933 was unveiled in Kindrativka near the village house of culture.

== Local government ==
Until 2016, the local government body was the Kindrativka Village Council.

== Demographics ==
According to the 2001 Ukrainian census, the village's population was 852 people. The main languages of the village were:

- Ukrainian 93.74%
- Russian 5.57%
- Armenian 0.46%
- Other/Not specific 0.23%

In the spring of 2024, the security situation in the village worsened, so at the end of April the head of the community emphasized the need to leave for safer areas. Since then, about 50 people have left, about a hundred more have not been evacuated. There are no children in the village anymore, mostly elderly people remain.

As of June 2025, the population of Kindrativka is 6 people.

== Economy ==
The central estate of Agrofirma "Lan" LLC is located on the territory of the village of Kindrativka. The farm grows grain crops and sugar beets, and meat and dairy farming is also developed. The director of the agrofirma is Ivanchenko Serhiy Mykolayovych.

== Transport ==
Buses run between the district center and Kindrativka 7 times a day.

== Notable people ==
The following were born in the village:

- Pavlo Mykhailovych Avramenko (28.12.1923-26.9.1981)
- Afanasiev Vitaliy Volodymyrovych - Ukrainian soldier, participant in the Russo-Ukrainian War.
- Roman Oleksandrovych Ganichenko - Ukrainian soldier, a participant in the Russo-Ukrainian War.
- Nikolai Dokashenko (20.11.1921-1992)
- Marko Kononovych Lykhobaba (27.02.1909-17.03.1944)
- Mikhail Vladimirovich Nadezhdin (born May 18, 1935)
- Petro Karpovych Fomenko (1900–1983) - Ukrainian carver.
- Pavlo Filipovich Shaparenko (10.09.1931-22.02.2008)
