= Etnograficheskoe Obozrenie =

Academic journal

- Discipline: Sociocultural anthropology, ethnography, ethnology
- Language: Russian
- Edited by: Sergey Valeryevich Sokolovskiy

Publication details
- Former name(s): Sovetskaia Etnografia, Etnografia, Etnograficheskoe Obozrenie
- History: 1889–present
- Publisher: N.N. Miklukho-Maklai Institute of Ethnology and Anthropology (Russia)
- Frequency: Bimonthly

Standard abbreviations
- ISO 4: Etnogr. Obozr.

Indexing
- ISSN: 0869-5415
- LCCN: 92645264
- OCLC no.: 1248393143

Links
- Journal homepage; Online archives

Etnograficheskoe Obozrenie (Russian: Этнографическое Обозрение, romanized: Etnograficheskoe Obozrenie; English: Ethnographic Review) is a peer-reviewed academic journal covering "the study of peoples and cultures of the world". It is published by the N.N. Miklukho-Maklai Institute of Ethnology and Anthropology (Russian Academy of Sciences).

== Abstracting and indexing ==
The journal is abstracted and indexed in:

- Anthropological Literature
- EBSCO databases
- ERIH PLUS
- FRANCIS
- Index Islamicus
- International Bibliography of the Social Sciences
- Modern Language Association Database
- Russian Science Citation Index
- Scopus

== History ==
The journal was established in 1889. Its publication, however, was suspended between 1916 and 1926 "due to the turmoil of the revolutionary era" but was resumed in 1926 under the new name Этнография (Etnografia) which was again changed to Советская Этнография (Sovetskaia Etnografia) in 1931. Its name was reverted to the initial title, Etnograficheskoe Obozrenie, in 1991 after the dissolution of the Soviet Union.

== Editors-in-chief ==
The following persons are or have been editor-in-chief:

- Sergey Valeryevich Sokolovskiy (present)
- Julia Pavlovna Petrova-Averkieva (1966–October 1980)
- Sergey Pavlovich Tolstov (1946–1966)
- Nikolay Mikhaylovich Matorin (1931–December 1934)
- Sergey Fyodorovich Oldenburg (1926–1931)
