= Ivan Meshchaninov =

Soviet linguist and ethnographer

Ivan Ivanovich Meshchaninov (Russian: Иван Иванович Мещанинов; 6 December 1883 – 16 January 1967) was a Soviet linguist and ethnographer. He was named a Hero of Socialist Labour in 1945.

== Biography ==
Born in Ufa, he graduated from the Faculty of Law at the University of Saint Petersburg in 1907 and then briefly studied at Heidelberg University before taking up archaeology back at Saint Petersburg, graduating in 1910. He headed the archives of Institute of Archaeology until 1923 focusing on cataloguing the Elamite antiquities there. Between 1925 and 1933 he led a number or archaeological expeditions to the Northern Pontic region and Transcaucasia.

He became a member of the Academy of Sciences of the Soviet Union, as a historian, in 1932 and was director of the Peter the Great Museum of Anthropology and Ethnography from 1934 to 1937.

== Institute of Language and Thought ==
Meshchaninov was a follower of Nikolai Marr and succeeded him as head of the Soviet Institute of Language and Thought from 1935 to 1950. He advocated that material culture goes through developmental stages and that migratory changes were secondary in this process. He published A New Theory in Languages, a guide to Marrism, and later Verb and Parts of Speech and Phrase Elements. As a linguist, however, Meshchaninov did not adhere straightforwardly to the radical Marrism, but rather tended to reconcile its ideas with a more objective historical linguistics and typology. He advocated the idea of notional categories that is also found in Otto Jespersen's works, studied polysynthetic languages and syntax.

Then in 1948 a move against the Anti-Marrists was initiated, in which however it was not Meshchaninov himself who played a major role, but rather younger Marrists as Fedot Filin, depicting such people as Viktor Vinogradov and Aleksandr Reformatskii as "bourgeois idealists". While the last Marrist campaign was successful in Leningrad, he met resistance amongst linguists in Moscow, and also from the Caucausian linguists. Among linguists who resisted Marrism were Boris Serebrennikov, Arnold Chikobava, Hrachia Acharian, and Grigor Ghapantsyan.

In 1950 he was denounced by Joseph Stalin: "The Arakcheyev regime was set up by the 'disciples' of N. Y. Marr." This term, derived from the tsarist military officer Aleksey Arakcheyev (1768–1834), means a regime having "... a policy of extreme reaction, police despotism and crude militarism". However Stalin stated that he "did not question the honesty of Comrade Meshchaninov and others", which resulted in that Meshchaninov lost his position at the Institute of Language and Thought but continued carrying out research and held all his titles, medals and honours. Following Stalin's death he became active in linguistics again and re-edited his major works.

He died in Leningrad in 1967.

Preceded by Nikolay Matorin	Director of the Institute of Anthropology and Ethnography; 1934–1937	Succeeded by Vasily Struve
