= Commission for the Study of the Tribal Composition of the Population of the Borderlands of Russia =

The Commission for the Study of the Tribal Composition of the Population of the Borderlands of Russia (Russian: Комиссия по изучению племенного состава населения России и сопредельных стран, shortened to КИПС, KIPS) was set up in February 1917 under the auspices of the Russian Academy of Sciences. Its aim was to support the war effort as expert-produced ethnographic knowledge was important during a war "conducted to a significant degree in connection with the nationality question".

The commission, headed by academician Sergey Oldenburg was composed of noted Russian Ethnographers based in St Petersburg: Aleksey Shakhmatov, Mikhail Diakonov, Nikolai Marr, Vasily Bartold, Vladimir Peretts, Evfimii Karskii from the Academy of Sciences, Sergei Rudenko and Fedor Volkov from the Anthropological Society of St Petersburg University, Andrei Rudnev and Lev Shcherba from the University's Philological Society and David Zolotarev and Nikolai Mogiliansky from the Russian Geographical Society's Ethnographic Division. Later it was expanded to include 18 members:. В. Бартольд, В. И. Вернадский, М. А. Дьяконов, Е. Ф. Карский, Н. Я. Марр, С. Ф. Ольденбург (chairman), В. Н. Перетц, А. А. Шахматов (deputy chairman), а также Ф. К. Волков, Э. А. Вольтер, Д. А. Золотарёв, Н. М. Могилянский, С. К. Патканов, С. И. Руденко (learned secretary), А. Д. Руднев, А. Н. Самойлович, Л. Я. Штернберг, Л. В. Щерба.

The commission was charged with the task of producing maps of those areas which "lie on both sides" of Russia's European and Asiatic borders and which are "contiguous with our enemies". This included Lithuania, Poland, Galicia, Ruthenia Bukovina and parts of Bessarabia in Europe and parts of Turkestan and the Caucasus bordering Iran.

Different ethnographers advocated different approaches: Karskii wanted to focus on native language, whereas Rudenko favoured more physical anthropology – particularly to assess the suitability of local people for integration into the war effort. Following the example of the map commission of the Russian Geographical Society, they adopted a different process in Europe and Asia. They used previous material gathered by the map commission to make maps of former Russian Imperial territory then occupied by the German Army – thereby preventing any fieldwork. However to the East they dispatched ethnographic field trips which would help get a better picture of how language groups were diffused across Central Asia.

== Under the Provisional Government ==
Owing to the political turmoil following the February Revolution, the Commission did not get much work done until September 1917, following Oldenburg's brief stint as Minister of Education. With funding from that ministry, the commission met four times in September (5th, 8th, 9th and 25th). By early October it was working with the National Department of the Ministry of Internal Affairs. This included drafting legislation to ensure that local languages were used in local government and particular regulations to protect the Kirgiz from Russian domination in Central Asia. In October the Provisional Government issued an official statement on the nationality question which guaranteed minority rights. They also set up the Commission on Nationality Affairs with Oldenburg at its head. However, on October 24 the Bolsheviks staged their coup. Despite his Kadet sympathies, Oldenburg entered into negotiations with Lenin on behalf of the Russian Academy of Sciences, and in 1918 when Oldenburg and six other representatives of the Academy signed an agreement with the Soviet regime, three of these were members of KIPS.
