= Oleksiivka, Khotin settlement hromada =

Village in Sumy Oblast, Ukraine

Oleksiivka Олексіївка
- Village
- Interactive map of Oleksiivka
- Location of Oleksiivka Oleksiivka (Ukraine)
- Coordinates: 51°8′6″N 34°52′10″E
- Country: Ukraine
- Oblast: Sumy Oblast
- Raion: Sumy Raion
- Hromada: Khotin settlement hromada
- Elevation: 549 m (1,801 ft)

Population (2001)
  - Total: 83
- Time zone: UTC+2
  - Summer (DST): UTC+3
- Postal code: 42316
- Area code: +380 542

Oleksiivka is a village in Ukraine, in Khotin settlement hromada, Sumy Raion, Sumy Oblast. Until 2016, the local government body was Oleksiivka Village Council.

== Geography ==
The village of Oleksiivka is located at one of the sources of the Snagist River. The villages of Volodymyrivka, Andriivka and Novomykolaivka are located 2.5 km away. The border with Russia is 4 km away.

== History ==
On March 9, 1943, Nazi soldiers burned 300 households in the village of Oleksiivka.

On June 12, 2020, in accordance with the Resolution of the Cabinet of Ministers of Ukraine No. 723-r "On the Determination of Administrative Centers and Approval of Territories of Territorial Communities of Sumy Region", it became part of the Khotin settlement hromada.

On July 19, 2020, as a result of the administrative-territorial reform and liquidation of the Sumy Raion (1923–2020), the village became part of the newly formed Sumy Raion.

=== Russo-Ukrainian War ===
On July 10, 2022, the Russian army used cannon and rocket artillery to shell the villages of Volodymyrivka and Oleksiivka.

On July 19, 2024, Russian troops shelled the village. One explosion was recorded, probably a VOG drop from a UAV.

On June 7, 2025, Russian forces both entered the village. The village was captured by Russian forces on June 12, 2025. On July 21, 2025, the fighters of the Ukrainian Defense Forces recaptured the settlement from Russian troops. On 11 August 2025, Russian forces re-entered the village and restarted the battle for the village. On November 5, 2025, Russian forces recaptured the village. On November 7, 2025, Ukrainian forces re-contested the village. As of July 2026, the village is under Russian control.

== Demographics ==
According to data from 1864, the village of Vlasnytsia in the Sumsky Uyezd of the Kharkov Governorate had a population of 1,339 people (664 men and 675 women), 89 households, and a distillery.

As of 1885, the former private village of Pysarivska Volost had a population of 1,746 people, 238 households, an Orthodox church, a school, and 3 shops.

According to the 1897 census, the number of residents decreased to 1,506 people (725 males and 781 females), all of whom were Orthodox Christians.

By 1914, the number of residents had increased to 1,561.

According to the 2001 Ukrainian census, the village's population was 549 people. The main languages of the village were:

- Ukrainian 93.24%
- Russian 5.67%
- Armenian 0.55%
- Other/Not specific 0.54%

In 2025, the population was 0 people.

== Notable people ==
The following were born in the village:

- Oleksandra Trokhymivna Yermolenko (1938–2022) – Ukrainian artist of decorative and applied arts
- Oleksiy Dmytrovych Kuzmenko (1949) – a Ukrainian graphic artist.
- Serhiy Pavlovych Nosov (1978–2024) – a junior sergeant in the Armed Forces of Ukraine, a participant in the Russo-Ukrainian War.
- Volodymyr Kuzmych Puzik (1948) – scientist, Doctor of Agricultural Sciences, professor, corresponding member of the NAAS of Ukraine, rector of the V. V. Dokuchaev Kharkiv National Agrarian University
- Sadovsky Ivan Maksimovich (1912–1944) – Hero of the Soviet Union.
