= Veselivka, Sumy Oblast =

Veselivka Веселівка
- Village
- Interactive map of Veselivka
- Location of Veselivka within Ukraine Veselivka (Sumy Oblast)
- Coordinates: 51°12′4″N 34°56′12″E
- Country: Ukraine
- Oblast: Sumy Oblast
- Raion: Sumy Raion
- Hromada: Khotin settlement hromada
- Elevation: 185 m (607 ft)

Population (2001 census)
  - Total: 67
- Time zone: UTC+2 (EET)
  - Summer (DST): UTC+3 (EEST)
- Postal code: 42310
- Area code: +380 542

Veselivka (Ukrainian: Веселівка) is a village in Khotin settlement hromada, Sumy Raion, Sumy Oblast in Northern Ukraine. As of the 2001 census, it had a population of 67 people.

== Geography ==
Veselivka sits 3 km from the left bank of the Snagost River. A small unnamed stream flows near the village, marking the border with Russia. Directly across this stream is the Russian village of Uspenovka, Kursk Oblast. A seasonal drying stream, blocked by a dam, also runs through Veselivka.

== History ==
On June 12, 2020, according to the Ukrainian government's administrative reform (Cabinet of Ministers Order No. 723-r), Veselivka became part of the Khotyn settlement community. Later, on July 19, 2020, due to further territorial reform and the dissolution of the old Sumy Raion (1923–2020), the village was incorporated into the newly established Sumy Raion.

=== Russo-Ukrainian war (2022–present) ===
In March 2023, due to constant shelling by Russian forces, Veselivka was effectively cut off from major supply routes.

On July 19, 2024, the village was hit by a Russian attack, with reports of a single explosion, possibly caused by a drone-dropped explosive device. A few weeks later, on August 3, another explosion occurred, likely from a 120mm mortar round.

==== 2025 incursion ====
In late March 2025, footage surfaced showing Russian troops raising their flag in Veselivka. The Institute for the Study of War reported the village was likely under Russian control. Around the same time, Russia's defense minister claimed their forces had successfully captured the village.

== Demographics ==
As of the 2001 Ukrainian census, Veselivka had a population of 67 people. The linguistic composition of the settlement was as follows:

Native languages in Veselivka
	percent
Ukrainian	82.1%
Russian	16.4%
Belarusian	1.5%
others	0.0%
