= Kostiantynivka, Sumy Oblast =

Village in Sumy Oblast, Ukraine

Kostiantynivka Костянтинівка
- Village
- Interactive map of Kostiantynivka
- Location of Kindrativka Kostiantynivka (Ukraine)
- Coordinates: 51°10′17″N 34°45′52″E
- Country: Ukraine
- Oblast: Sumy Oblast
- Raion: Sumy Raion
- Hromada: Khotin settlement hromada

Population (2001)
  - Total: 246
- Time zone: UTC+2
  - Summer (DST): UTC+3
- Postal code: 42315
- Area code: +380 542

Kostiantynivka is a village in Ukraine, in Khotin settlement hromada, Sumy Raion, Sumy Oblast, Ukraine. Until 2016, the local government body was the Kindrativka Village Council.

== Geography ==
The village of Kostiantynivka is located 1.5 km from the left bank of the Sinyak River. At a distance of 2.5 km are the villages of Kindrativka and Novokostiantynivka. The village is located on the border with Russia.

The Muzhitsa River originates on the western outskirts of the village.

== History ==
On June 12, 2020, in accordance with the Resolution of the Cabinet of Ministers of Ukraine No. 723-r "On the Determination of Administrative Centers and Approval of Territories of Territorial Communities of Sumy Region", it became part of the Khotin settlement hromada.

On July 19, 2020, as a result of the administrative-territorial reform and liquidation of the Sumy Raion (1923—2020), the village became part of the newly formed Sumy Raion.

=== Russo-Ukrainian War ===
On July 14, 2024, the village was shelled by Russian forces. 6 explosions were recorded, which probably came from a helicopter.

Russian forces first entered the village before 29 May 2025. The village was captured by Russian forces on 29 May 2025. On 30 October 2025, Ukrainian forces moved into the east of the village, recontesting Kostiantynivka. As of July 2026, the village is under Russian control.

== Demographics ==
According to the 2001 Ukrainian census, the village's population was 246 people. The main languages of the village were:

- Russian 74.9%
- Ukrainian 25.1%

== Notable people ==
The following were born in the village:

- Hanna Vlasivna Koba - deputy of the Verkhovna Rada of the Ukrainian SSR of the 11th convocation.
- Mykhailo Volodymyrovych Nadezhdin - a Soviet and Ukrainian artist, painter, Honoured Artist of Ukraine (1994), People's Artist of Ukraine (1997). Laureate of the A. O. Osmerkin Prize. Deputy of the Kirovohrad Oblast Council.
