= Sergei Rudenko =

Sergei Ivanovich Rudenko
- Сергі́й Іва́нович Руде́нко
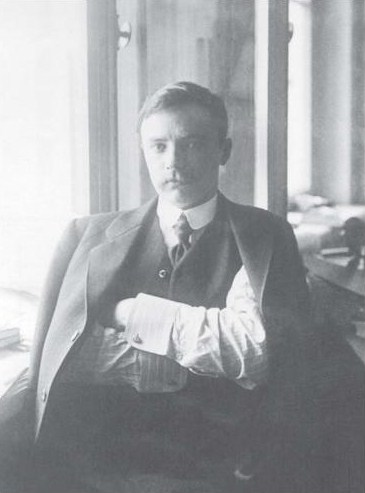
- Sergei Rudenko in 1924
- Born: January 16, 1885; Kharkov, Kharkov Governorate, Russian Empire
- Died: July 16, 1969 (aged 84); Leningrad, USSR
- Occupations: Anthropologist, archaeologist

Sergei Ivanovich Rudenko (Russian: Серге́й Ива́нович Руде́нко; Ukrainian: Сергі́й Іва́нович Руде́нко; January 16, 1885, Kharkov, Russian Empire – July 16, 1969, Leningrad, USSR) was a prominent Ukrainian, born to a noble Ukrainian family, and Soviet anthropologist and archaeologist who discovered and excavated the most celebrated of Scythian burials, Pazyryk in Siberia.

Rudenko was a follower of Paul Broca's "French School" of anthropology. He participated in the Russian Geographical Society's (IRGO) Map Commission established in 1910. In that year he participated in an expedition to the Ob River basin in Western Siberia, where he studied the Khanty people.

In 1917 he was a founder participant in the Commission for the Study of the Tribal Composition of the Population of the Borderlands of Russia (KIPS), along with several colleagues of the IRGO Map Commission.

Rudenko delivered lectures in the Leningrad University from 1921 to 1954. In 1947-1950 and 1954 he was sent by the Soviet Archaeology Institute to explore the kurgans in the Altai Mountains. During the excavation of Pazyryk tombs, he discovered the world's most spectacular tattooed mummy. In deference to the work of Rudenko and his anthropological usage, what was found is now said to belong to the Pazyryk Culture which flourished between the 7th and 3rd centuries BC.

Herodotus and other ancient writers referred to the Altai as "the golden mountain". It was there that the impregnable citadel of the Scythians (or Sacae) lay hidden for centuries. Rudenko, however, was cautious enough not to assign his findings to the Scythians. He attributed the kurgan finds to the formidable Iron Age horsemen and warriors, whom he dubbed the "Pazyryks". Although they left no written records, Pazyryk artifacts are distinguished by a sophisticated level of artistry and craftsmanship.

The Pazyryk tombs discovered by Rudenko were in an almost perfect state of preservation. They contained skeletons and intact bodies of horses and embalmed humans, together with a wealth of artifacts including saddles, riding gear, a chariot, rugs, clothing, jewelry, musical instruments, amulets, tools, and an "apparatus for inhaling hemp smoke". Also found in the tombs were fabrics from Persia and China, which the Pazyryks must have obtained on journeys covering thousands of miles.

In 1925, in an essay he wrote with Ivan Rakovskyi, he developed a theory (contrary to Fedir Vovk's theory) that the Ukrainian population consisted not of one racial (Dinaric) type but of at least six European racial types (although with the Dinaric type predominant).
