= Khotin, Sumy Oblast =

Rural locality in Sumy Oblast, Ukraine

Khotin Хотінь
- Rural settlement
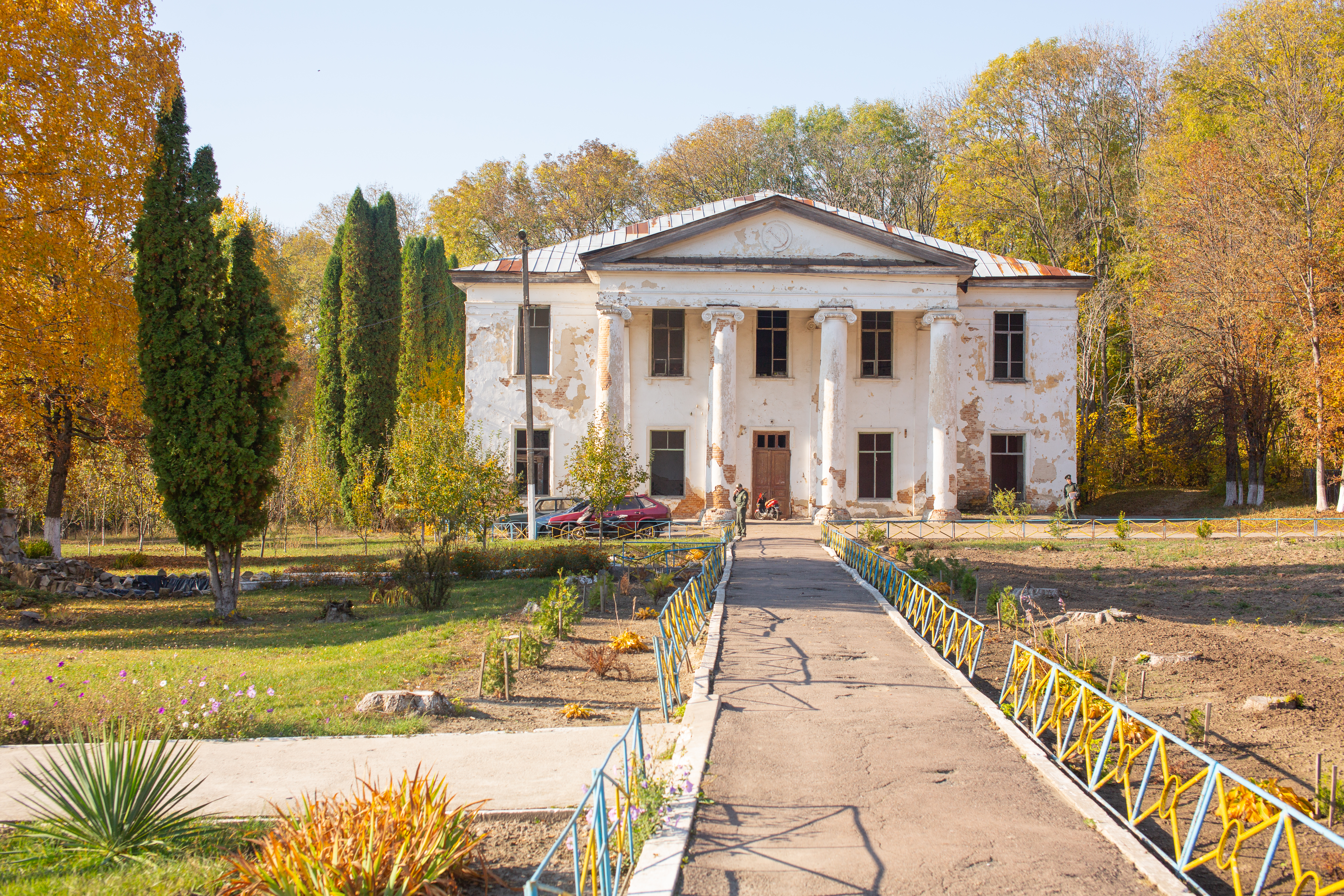
- Count Komburley Manor

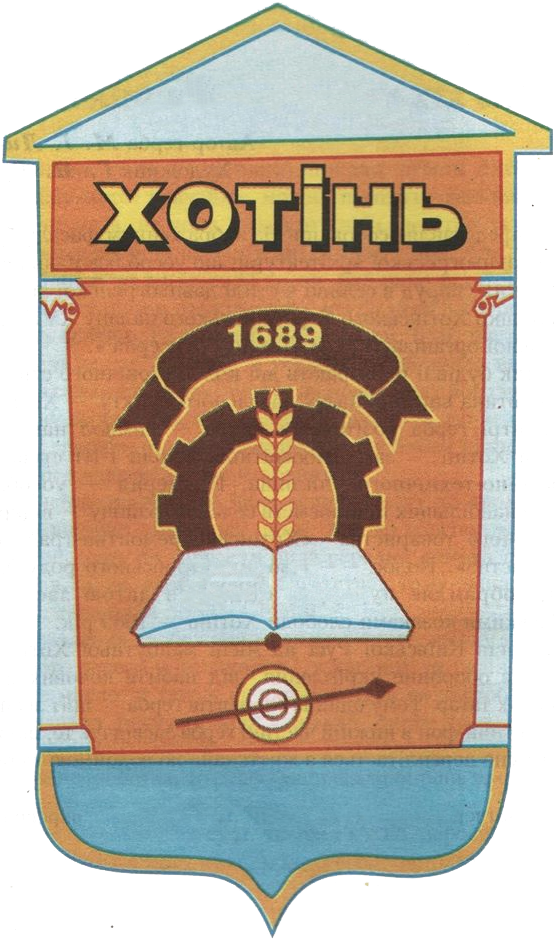
- Coat of arms
- Interactive map of Khotin
- Location in Sumy Oblast Location in Ukraine
- Country: Ukraine
- Oblast: Sumy Oblast
- Raion: Sumy Raion
- Hromada: Khotin settlement hromada
- Elevation: 159 m (522 ft)

Population (2022)
  - Total: 2,290
- Time zone: UTC+2 (EET)
  - Summer (DST): UTC+3 (EEST)
- Postal code: 42320
- Area code: +380 542
- KATOTTH: UA59080290010046940

Khotin (Ukrainian: Хотінь; Russian: Хотень) is a rural settlement in Sumy Raion, Sumy Oblast, Ukraine. It is located on the banks of the Oleshnia, a right tributary of the Psel in the drainage basin of the Dnieper. Khotin hosts the administration of Khotin settlement hromada, one of the hromadas of Ukraine. Population: 2,290 (2022 estimate).

== Geography ==
The village of "Khotin" is located on the banks of the Oleshnya River (a tributary of the Psyol River). Upstream is the village of Pisarevka). Downstream, 1 km away, is the village of Krovnoye. The Russia-Ukraine border is 10 kilometers away.

== History ==
For the first time, Khotin is mentioned in the "List of Russian cities, far and near", compiled at the end of the 14th century. The Crimean Tatar raids of the 15th and 16th centuries destroyed Khoten. A settlement on the right bank of the Oleshnya River indicates the location of the ancient city.

In 1689, the Sumy colonel G. Kondratyev built a colonel's courtyard, a mill, and a church on the left bank of the Oleshnya River. At the beginning of the 19th century, the privy councilor Mikhail Ivanovich Komburley commissioned the St. Petersburg architect Giacomo Quarenghi to design a new estate, according to which a luxurious 87-room palace was built and a park was laid out. In 19th century, the village of Khoten was the volost center of the Khotin volost of the Sumy Uyezd of the Kharkov Governorate.

Khotin was visited by the educator Vasily Karazin, the writers Vasily Tumansky and Fyodor Glinka, the Decembrist Sergey Volkonsky, and the poet Denis Davydov. The military historian Dmitry Buturlin lived and worked here for a long time. In the second half of the 19th century, at the invitation of the new owner, Count P. S. Stroganov (Honorary Member of the Academy of Arts), and artists such as Ivan Nikolaevich Kramskoy and Fyodor Aleksandrovich Vasiliev visited here.

In 1918, the Khoten Palace complex was destroyed by fire. Two side wings remain, now housing the local secondary school.

During the Great Patriotic War from October 15, 1941 to September 2, 1943, the village was occupied by German troops. Since 1968 it was designated an urban-type settlement. In 1977, several food industry enterprises operated here. In January 1989, the population was 3,770 people (1,816 men and 1,954 women).

As of January 1, 2013, the population was 2,468 people. During the Russian invasion of Ukraine, Ukrainian authorities claimed that two siblings were fatally shot by a Russian sabotage group that had infiltrated the village in January 2024.

Until 26 January 2024, Khotin was designated urban-type settlement. On this day, a new law entered into force which abolished this status, and Khotin became a rural settlement.

== Economy ==
=== Transportation ===
The settlement has access to Highway H07 which runs south to Sumy, Romny, and Kyiv. The same highway runs north to the Russian border and across the border to Sudzha and Kursk.

=== Industry ===
- Dairy farm;
- Khoten food processing plant;
- Khoten bakery;
- Agrofirm "Khoten", LLC;
- "Khoten-Khleb", LLC;
- "Favor", LLC.

== Social sphere ==
- School;
- Khotyn Professional Agricultural Lyceum;
- Vocational School No. 35;
- Memorial to fallen soldiers of the Great Patriotic War.

== Notable people ==
- Nikolai Petrovich Galchenko (1920-1943) - Hero of the Soviet Union, born in the village of Pysarivka, which became part of Khotyn.
- Ivan Ivanovich Nikitin (1907-1998) - recipient of the Order of Lenin, four Orders of the Red Banner of Labor, the Order of the Badge of Honor, the Order of Friendship of Peoples, and many medals. He rose from a simple worker to the general director of one of the largest enterprises in the USSR, the flagship of domestic mechanical engineering. He was chief designer, chief engineer, director of a compressor plant, general director of the Sumy M.V. Frunze Plant (1966-1969), and director of VNIIKompressormash (1969-1971). A graduate of the Khoten school. Honorary citizen of the village of Khoten.
- Emelyan Ivanovich Prosyanik (1900-1990) — Hero of the Soviet Union
- Aleksandr Aleksandrovich Roychenko (1911-1943) — Hero of the Soviet Union
- Yakov Gerasimovich Tsvintarny (1904-1944) — Soviet military leader, colonel.
