= Novomykolaivka, Sumy Oblast =

Village in Sumy Oblast, Ukraine

Novomykolaivka Новомиколаївка
- Village
- Interactive map of Novomykolaivka
- Location of Novomykolaivka Novomykolaivka (Ukraine)
- Coordinates: 51°9′20″N 34°54′16″E
- Country: Ukraine
- Oblast: Sumy Oblast
- Raion: Sumy Raion
- Hromada: Khotin settlement hromada
- Elevation: 194 m (636 ft)

Population (2001)
  - Total: 136
- Time zone: UTC+2
  - Summer (DST): UTC+3
- Postal code: 42316
- Area code: +380 542

Novomykolaivka is a village in Ukraine, in Khotin settlement hromada, Sumy Raion, Sumy Oblast. Until 2016, the local government body was Oleksiivka Village Council.

== Geography ==
The village of Novomykolaivka is located at a distance of up to 2 km from the villages of Vodolahy, Volodymyrivka, Oleksiivka and the village of Varachyne. A drying stream with a dam flows through the village.

== History ==
On June 12, 2020, in accordance with the Resolution of the Cabinet of Ministers of Ukraine No. 723-r "On the Determination of Administrative Centers and Approval of Territories of Territorial Communities of Sumy Region", it became part of the Khotin settlement hromada.

On July 19, 2020, as a result of the administrative-territorial reform and liquidation of the Sumy Raion (1923—2020), the village became part of the newly formed Sumy Raion.

On July 16, 2024, Russian troops shelled the village. 5 explosions were recorded, probably from a 120 mm mortar.

Russian forces first entered the village on 4 July 2025. Russian forces captured the village on the same day. On 8 July 2025, Ukrainian forces launched a counterattack on the settlement, recontesting the village. The Russians recaptured the settlement of 19 July 2025. On 31 December 2025, Deep State UA confirmed that Russian forces captured Novomykolaivka.

== Demographics ==
According to the 2001 Ukrainian census, the village's population was 136 people. The main languages of the village were:

- Ukrainian 90.23%
- Russian 9.77%
