= Yefim Karsky =

Belarusian linguist (1861–1931)

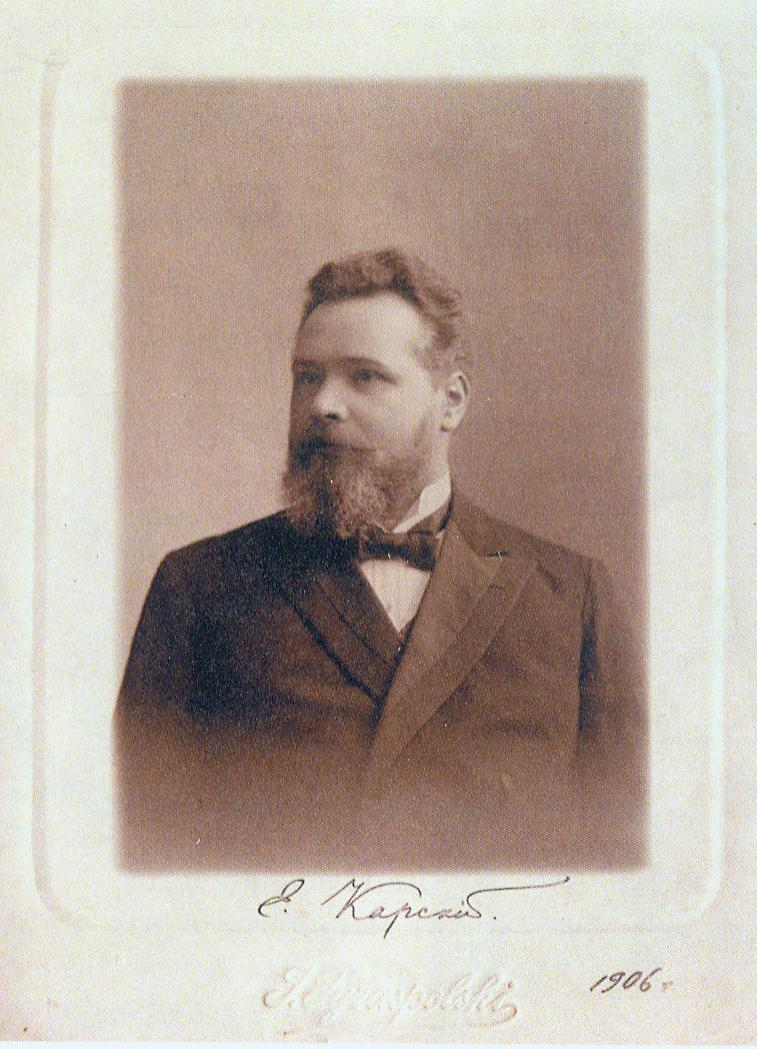
Karsky in 1906

Yefim Fyodorovich Karsky (Belarusian: Яўхім Фёдаравіч Карскі, romanized: Jaŭchim Fiodaravič Karski, Russian: Ефим Фёдорович Карский; Russian: Евфимий Феодорович Карский, older name form) (1 January 1861 [O.S. 20 December 1860] – 29 April 1931) was a Belarusian linguist, Slavist, ethnographer, and paleographer, founder of Belarusian linguistics, literary studies and paleography, a member of numerous scientific institutions, and author of more than 100 works on linguistics, ethnography, paleography and others.

Karsky was described by his contemporaries as extremely industrious, accurate, self-organized, and reserved in behavior. He was acclaimed as a scientist of the highest integrity. Karsky's input into contemporary Slavistics, especially into the Belarusian branch, was immense. The first significant revisions of Karsky's views on the development of the Church Slavonic and Russian languages were proposed much later, by Viktor Vinogradov. One of the best known works of Karsky is Belarusians.

== Biography ==
=== Early life and education ===
Yefim Karsky was born in Lasha (in Grodno Governorate, now Grodno Region), to the family of teacher F. Novitskiy and Orthodox deacon's daughter M. Novitskaya. Initially, he bore the family name of his mother, Novitskiy. With his family, he spent his childhood years in Navahrudak and Minsk regions of Belarus. He studied in Folk School (Russian: народное училище) at Yatra, (Navahrudak uyezd) during the 1870s, and in 1874 enrolled in the Minsk Ecclesiastical School, where he joined the Seminary. Around 1881 he became interested in ethnography, and left his ecclesiastical studies to join the Nezhin historical-philological institute. His first philological research paper was published in 1883 in the Russian Philological Courier.

Karsky graduated from the Nezhin historical-philological institute in 1885 in the field of Russian and Slavonic philology. Observing the absence of scientific analysis of the Belarusian language, he published his first major scientific work Review of Sounds and Forms of Belarusian Language in 1886. Upon his graduation he taught Russian and Church Slavonic languages and Russian literature at the 2nd Vilnius Gymnasium, where he also served as the secretary and as elected member of the Resources Committee. He passed his magisterial examination in 1891, and in 1893 left the Liceum and began teaching Russian language in Warsaw University. During his tenure there he also taught Slavonic paleography, Russian dialectology, and Church Slavonic grammar. He would defend his magisterial thesis To the history of sounds and forms of the Belarusian talk at Kiev University, which was the first published academic dissertation concerned with the Belarusian language. He would continue his studies of the Belarusian language, and in 1898 he began studying the local dialects of the Belarusian people, both by the literary artifacts and by ethnographic tours to the Grodno, Vil’na, Minsk regions, among others. In 1901 Karsky became an associated member of Saint Petersburg Academy of Sciences, department of Russian language and literacy.

=== Later career ===
From 1905 to 1910 Karsky served two terms as the rector of Warsaw University. After the end of his second term in 1910, he refused to remain at the position in protest of the policies of Imperial Minister of Education Lev Kasso. He moved to Petrograd in 1916 and became a member of Saint Petersburg Academy of Sciences, with specialization in ethnography and linguistics. He taught at Petrograd Imperial University, and was a founder member of the Commission for the Study of the Tribal Composition of the Population of the Borderlands of Russia. In 1918, forced by the economic ruin in Petrograd from World War I and the October Revolution, Karsky moved to Minsk. He was given tenure at Minsk Pedagogical Institute, but was dismissed from his position the following year, shortly before being arrested by the Extraordinary Commission. He was not held for long, and that same year moved back to Petrograd. He resumed his teaching at Petrograd University, staying through its rechristening as Leningrad University in 1924. He also returned to the Saint Petersburg Academy of Sciences (at that point the Academy of Sciences of the USSR) where he became Head of the Museum of Anthropology and Ethnography. In 1922 he donated his personal library to the newly created Belarusian State University. Beginning in 1926 he made scientific visits to Poland, Czechoslovakia, and Yugoslavia. His reports from these visits were highly appreciated by the USSR Academy of Sciences, but they began to have political repercussions for him. He began to butt heads with the leadership of the Academy, and in 1927 he became the target of a sharp political critique in the newspapers "Zvyazda" (Myensk) and "Pravda" (Moscow). His membership in the USSR Academy of Sciences was put under question, and despite enjoying a certain amount of political patronage he wasn't given the room in the press to defend himself. In 1929, he was elected for the member of the Czech Academy of Sciences. The following year, however, he was abruptly removed from the position of the Director of the Peter the Great Museum of Anthropology and Ethnography in Leningrad.

For his teaching and research activities, Karsky was given the civil rank of "real state's counselor" (?). He was decorated with orders of St. Stanislaus III grade (1889) and II grade (1899), St. Anna III grade (1895) and II grade (1903), St. Vladimir IV grade (1911), various medals. In recognition of his research on the Belarusian ethnography, he was awarded the Great Golden Medal of the Russian Geographical Society (1894), the Golden Medals of Batyushkov of the Russian Academy of Sciences (1898, 1902), Minor Lomonosov Prize of Russian Academy of Sciences (1901), Batyushkov Academical Prize (1910), and Akhmatov Academical Prize (1913).

In 1964, a memorial for Karski was opened at the Lasha School.

== Works ==
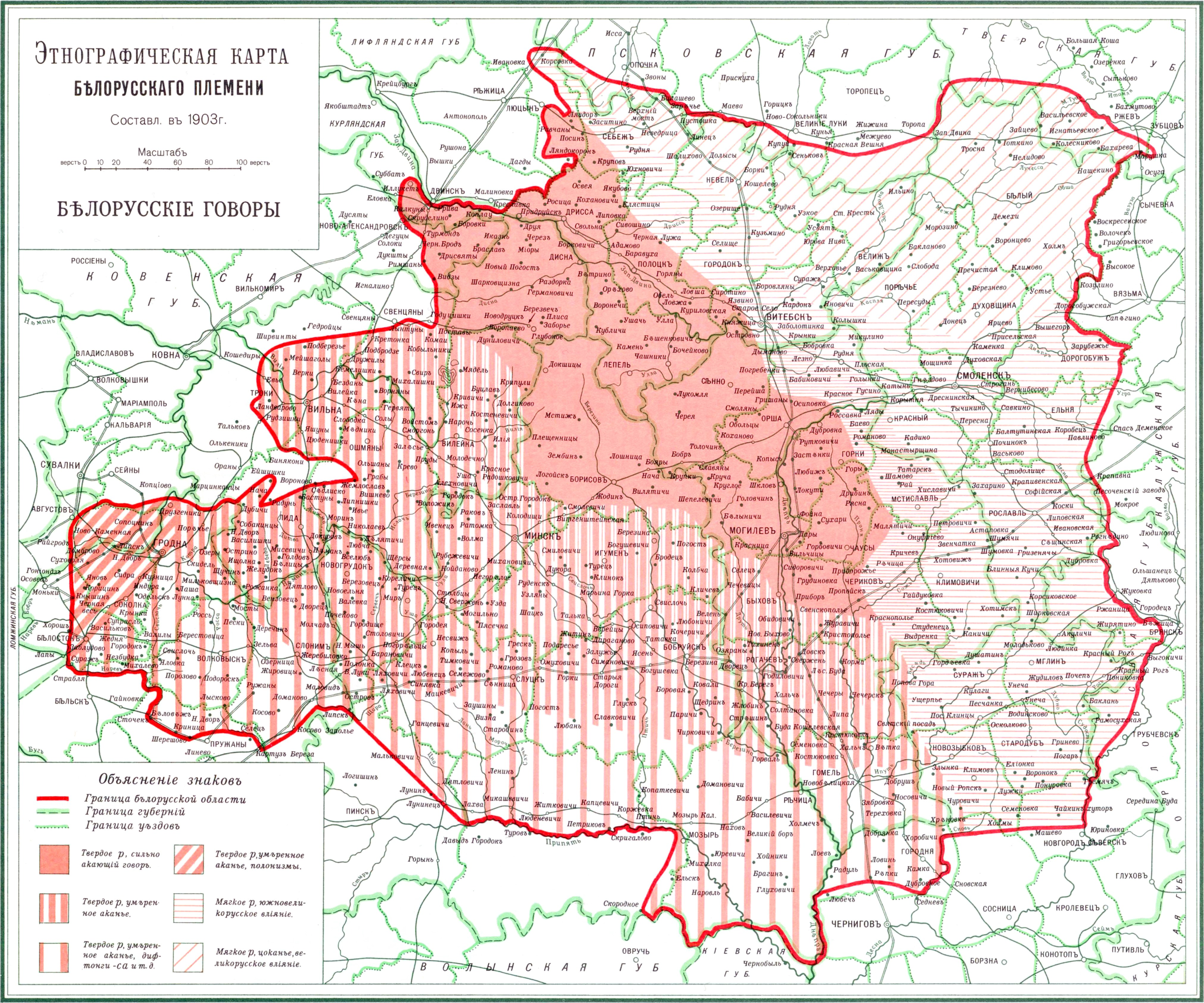
Belarusians, 1903

Karsky was the author of at least 100 significant scientific works. Some of the major ones are listed below. It is worth noting that in case of the older publications, the actual dates of the publications may be different than the dates on the front pages.

- Обзор звуков и форм белорусской речи. – Москва, 1886. – Известия Историко-филологического Института в Нежине, том X.
- Грамматика древнего церковнославянского языка сравнительно с русским (курс средних учебных заведений). – Вильна, 1888–1900, Варшава, 1901–1916, Сергиев Посад, 1917.
- К истории звуков и форм белорусской речи. – Варшава, 1893. – Магистерская диссертация.
- К вопросу о разработке старого западнорусского наречия. – Вильна, 1893.
- Что такое древнее западнорусское наречие?. – Труды Девятого археологического съезда в Вильне, 1893.
- О языке так называемых литовских летописей. – Варшава, 1894.
- Особенности письма и языка Мстиславова Евангелия. – Русск. Филолог. Вестн., 1895.
- Образцы славянского кирилловского письма с Х по XVIII век. – Варшава, 1901.
- Очерк славянской кирилловской палеографии. – Варшава, 1901.
- Славянская кирилловская палеография. [S.l.], 1928. Of note: Multiocular O

Work re-published in: Карский Е. Ф. Славянская кирилловская палеография. Moscow, 1979.

=== Belarusians ===
- Белорусcы. Т. I. Введение в изучение языка и народной словесности. – Варшава, 1903.

Work re-published: Белорусcы. Т. I. Введение в изучение языка и народной словесности. – Вильна, 1904.

- Белорусcы. Т. II. Язык белорусского племени. В. 1. – [S.l.], 1908.
- Белорусcы. Т. II. Язык белорусского племени. 2. Исторический очерк словообразования и словоизменения в белорусском наречии. – [S.l.], 1911.
- Белорусcы. Т. II. Язык белорусского племени. 3. Очерки синтаксиса белорусского наречия. Дополнения и поправки. – [S.l.], 1912.
- Белорусы. Т. III. Очерки словесности белорусского племени. 1. Народная поэзия. – Москва, 1916.
- Белорусы. Т. III. Очерки словесности белорусского племени. 2. Старая западнорусская литература. – Петроград, 1921.
- Белорусы. Т. III. Очерки словесности белорусского племени. 3. Художественная литература на народном наречии. – [S.l.], 1922.

Complete work re-published: Белорусы: Т. 1 – 3. – Москва, 1955–1956.

Preceded by Vasily Bartold	Director of the Peter the Great Museum of Anthropology and Ethnography; 1921–1930	Succeeded by Nikolay Matorin
