= Khotin settlement hromada =

Urban hromada of Sumy Oblast, Ukraine

Khotin settlement hromada Хотінська селищна громада
- Hromada
- Interactive map of Khotin settlement hromada
- Location within Sumy Oblast Location within Ukraine
- Coordinates: 51°4′32″N 34°46′35″E
- Country: Ukraine
- Oblast (province): Sumy Oblast
- Raion (district): Sumy Raion

Area
  - Total: 176.55 km^{2} (68.17 sq mi)

Population (2018)
  - Total: 5,526

Khotin settlement territorial hromada (Ukrainian: Хотінська селищна територіальна громада) is a hromada in Ukraine, in Sumy Raion, Sumy Oblast. The administrative centre is the village of Khotin. The area of the community is 176.55 km^{2}, and the population is 5,526 (2018).

It was formed on September 12, 2016, by merging the Khotin Village Council, Kindrativska Village Council and Oleksiivka Village Council of Sumy Raion.

On July 19, 2020, as a result of the administrative-territorial reform and liquidation of the Sumy Raion (1923—2020), the community joined the newly formed Sumy Raion.

On April 30, 2024, residents of a five-kilometer zone of the Khotin hromada were notified that they should temporarily leave their homes. This was told to Suspilny by Mykola Toryanyk, the head of the Khotin hromada. This decision is related to the situation intensifying.

On May 1, 2024, 25 people left the territory of the Khotin hromada for safe places. As of May 29, 2025, out of 14 settlements in the Khotin hromada, only two could be reached with some risk. Of the 12 remaining settlements, people had been evacuated from them, making them dead villages.

== Composition ==
In addition to one rural settlement (Khotin), the hromada includes 13 villages:

- Andriivka
- Bilovody
- Kindrativka
- Kostiantynivka
- Novokostiantynivka
- Novomykolaivka
- Oleksiivka
- Pysarivka
- Stepne
- Veselivka
- Vodolahy
- Volodymyrivka
- Zhuravka
