= Yulian Bromley =

Soviet anthropologist (1893–1968)

Yulian Vladimirovich Bromley (Russian: Юлиа́н Влади́мирович Бромле́й; 21 February 1921 – 4 June 1990) was a Soviet and Russian anthropologist who gained an international recognition. He became Director of the Institute of Ethnography at the Academy of Sciences of the Soviet Union in 1966 and held the post until 1989.

Bromley's main focus was studying the South Slavs, despite not actually engaging in fieldwork himself. His research framework led, in the words of Ernest Gellner, to a minor revolution which consisted of turning ethnography into the study of "Ethnos-es", often referred to as ethnicity by Western anthropologists. He wrote more than 300 texts, although he did not engage in fieldwork himself.

== Ethnos ==
Bromley described the term Ethnos as a word with many meanings, but the “closest” word of the term Ethnos, according to Bromley, is “people.” Ethnos is used to analyze communities. The term Ethnos has such a broad definition to prevent anthropologists from limiting their scopes to small, backwards communities, but instead view people as a whole. With this in mind, Ethnos can be used to view communities that go into the millions of people. Bromley states the main task of the word Ethnos is to define the common, generic name of community formations such as “tribe”, “nationality” and “nation” Bromley also states that all Ethnoses are unique for each possess a certain internal unity and specific features that distinguish themselves from other communities. As for what should be studied, Bromley defines three points of study: 1) folk culture, 2) to define the subject matter in terms of the method of direct observation, and 3) the subject matter of ethnography is determined by the range of problems which it is studied.

== Stance on race ==
Bromley also claimed that racial distinctions as a whole do not play any essential ethno-distinctive role, and that there are no "pure" racially unmixed people as by the absence of clearcut anthropological boundaries between contiguous peoples or ethnoses belonging to one of the major races. According to Bromley's framework, race does not matter when viewing the community structure as a whole, and racial purity is impossible.
