= Leopold von Schrenck =

Russian zoologist, geographer and ethnographer (1826–1894)

Peter Leopold von Schrenck
- Леопольд Иванович фон Шренк
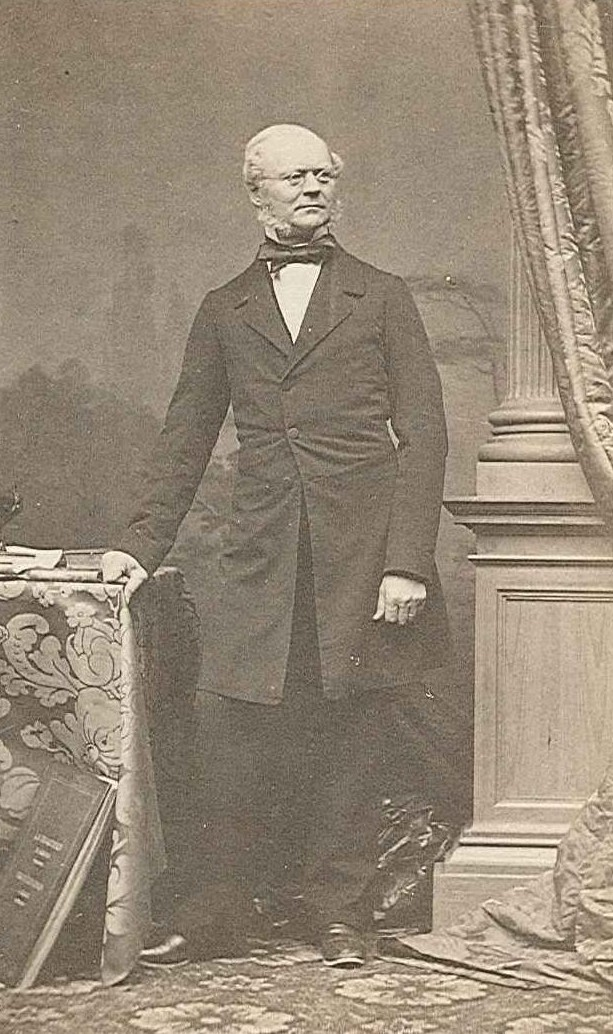
- Leopold von Schrenck in 1885
- Born: 1826; Sumsky Uyezd, Kharkov Governorate, Russian Empire
- Died: 8 January 1894 (aged 67–68); Saint Petersburg, Russian Empire
- Occupations: Zoologist, geographer, ethnographer
- Scientific career
- Author abbrev. (zoology): Schren(c)k

Peter Leopold von Schrenck (Russian: Леопольд Иванович фон Шренк; 1826 – 8 January 1894) was a Russian zoologist, geographer and ethnographer.

== Biography ==
Schrenck came from a Baltic German family, and was born and raised in the Khotin Manor House, Sumsky Uyezd, Kharkov Governorate. He received his doctorate from the Imperial University of Dorpat, and then studied natural sciences in Berlin and Königsberg. He joined the crew of the Aurora (Russian Imperial Navy frigate) in the circumnavigation of the world.

In 1853 Schrenck was sent by the St Petersburg Academy of Sciences to explore the Amurland on board the schooner Vostok. He reached the mouth of the Amur in September 1854 with the botanist Carl Maximowicz. In February 1855 he visited Sakhalin and then explored the Amur in the spring and summer. In 1856 he returned overland to Europe, via Lake Baykal. He published his findings in his Reisen und Forschungen im Amur-Lande in den Jahren 1854-56, in two quarto volumes, 1858–60, with more than 350 pages on birds. In later years Schrenck turned his attention to the study of the native peoples of Russia. On 10 November 1879 he was appointed director of the Peter the Great Museum of Anthropology and Ethnography in St Petersburg.

A number of animals are named after Schrenck, including the following species.

- Schrenck's limpet, Notoacmea schrenckii
- Amur sturgeon, Acipenser shrenckii
- Manchurian black water snake, Elaphe schrenckii
- Schrenck's bittern, Ixobrychus eurhythmus
- A butterfly, Apatura schrenckii.

== Selected publications ==
- Über die Luchsarten des Nordens und ihre geographische Verbreitung. Ein Beitrag zur zoologischen Geographie (On the lynx species of the North and their geographical distribution. A contribution to zoological geography), Dissertation Dorpat 1849
- Reisen und Forschungen im Amur-Lande in den Jahren 1854–1856 (Travels and researches in Amurland in the years 1854–1856), 4 vols., St. Peterburg 1858–1900 (in several editions)
  - Vols. 1 & 2 Zoologie (Zoology)
  - Vol. 3 Die Völker des Amurlandes (The peoples of the Amurland; the posthumously published Gilyak-German and Goldish-German dictionaries were edited by Wilhelm Grube.)
  - Vol. 4 Meteorologische Beobachtungen (Meteorological observations)
- Die von der Kaiserlichen Akademie der Wissenschaften ausgerüstete Expedition nach den neusibirischen Inseln und dem Jana-Lande : Zur Vorgeschichte der Expedition (The expedition to the New Siberian Islands and the Yana Land, equipped by the Imperial Academy of Sciences: On the history of the expedition), St. Petersburg 1887

== See also ==
- List of Baltic German scientists

== Sources ==
- "Шренк, Леопольд Иванович" . Brockhaus and Efron Encyclopedic Dictionary (in Russian). 1906.
- Mearns and Mearns (1988). Biographies for Birdwatchers: the lives of those commemorated in Western Palearctic bird names. Foreword by Sir Peter Scott. LCCN 89-169680 ISBN 0-12-487422-3
  - 2022 edition. ISBN 9780955673917.

Preceded by New Institution created by merger of the ethnographic and anatomical museums in St Petersburg	Director of the Peter the Great Museum of Anthropology and Ethnography; 1879–1894	Succeeded by Vasily Radlov
