= Pysarivka, Sumy Oblast =

Village in Sumy Oblast, Ukraine

Pysarivka Писарівка
- Village
- Interactive map of Pysarivka
- Location of Pysarivka Pysarivka (Ukraine)
- Coordinates: 51°4′32″N 34°49′35″E
- Country: Ukraine
- Oblast: Sumy Oblast
- Raion: Sumy Raion
- Hromada: Khotin settlement hromada

Population (2001)
  - Total: 829
- Time zone: UTC+2
  - Summer (DST): UTC+3
- Postal code: 42321
- Area code: +380 542

Pysarivka (Ukrainian: Писарівка; Russian: Писаревка) is a village in Ukraine, in Khotin settlement hromada, Sumy Raion, Sumy Oblast. Until 2016, the local government body was Khotin Village Council.

== Geography ==
The village of Pysarivka is located on the banks of the Oleshnya River, upstream at a distance of 2 km is the village of Ivolzhanske, downstream is adjacent to the village of Khotin. There is a large dam on the river. A large forest massif (oak) adjoins the village. The H07 highway passes through the village.

== History ==
On June 12, 2020, in accordance with the Resolution of the Cabinet of Ministers of Ukraine No. 723-r "On the Determination of Administrative Centers and Approval of Territories of Territorial Communities of Sumy Region", it became part of the Khotin settlement hromada.

On July 19, 2020, as a result of the administrative-territorial reform and liquidation of the Sumy Raion (1923—2020), the village became part of the newly formed Sumy Raion.

=== Russian invasion of Ukraine ===
On the night of 29-30 May 2022, two rockets hit the village of Pysarivka. 14 houses were damaged.

On August 14, 2024, the Operational Command North reported that the Russian forces shelled Sumy Oblast. 1 explosion was recorded in the village, probably a KAB. As a result of the shelling, 2 civilians were injured, one private house and household property were destroyed, and 11 private houses were damaged.

Russian forces first entered the village on 24 June 2026. By 26 August 2026, the village was captured by them.

== Population ==
According to data from 1864, the village of Vlasnytsia in the Sumsky Uyezd of the Kharkov Governorate had a population of 984 people (488 males and 496 females), 125 households, an Eastern Orthodox Church, and a post office.

As of 1885, the former private village, the center of a separate Pysariv Volost, had a population of 1,599 people, 219 households, an Orthodox church, a school, an inn, a shop, 3 fairs, and a beet sugar factory.

According to the 1897 census, the number of residents decreased to 1,393 people (705 males and 688 females), all of whom were Orthodox Christians.

By 1914, the village's population had grown to 1,551 people.

According to the 2001 Ukrainian census, the village's population was 829 people. The main languages of the village were:

- Ukrainian 93.62%
- Russian 5.66%
- Armenian 0.60%
- Belarusian 0.12%
