= Stanislav Kalesnik =

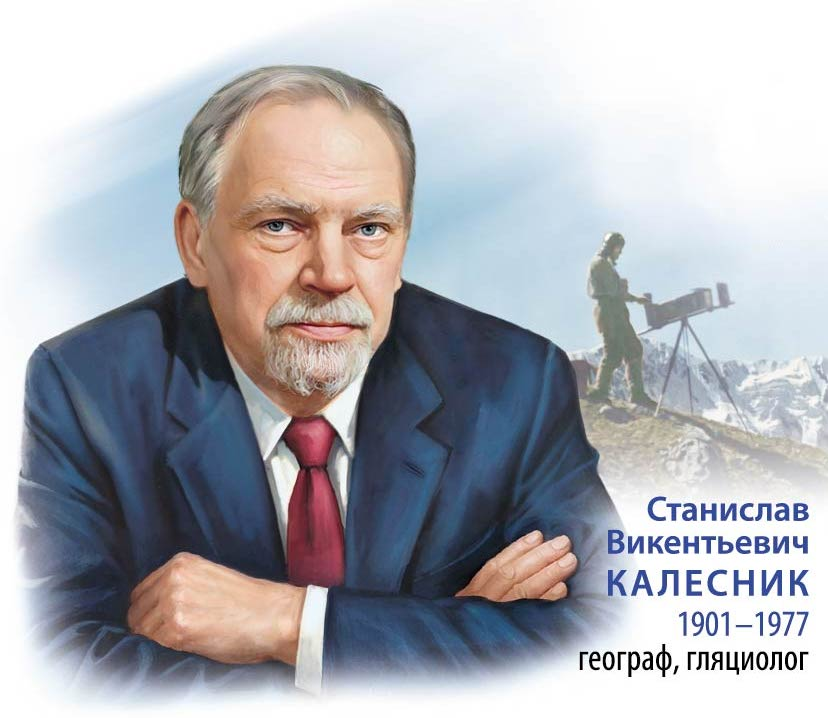
Kalesnik on a 2026 postcard of Russia.

Stanislav Vikentyevich Kalesnik (Russian: Станислав Викентьевич Калесник; 23 January 1901 – 13 September 1977) was a Soviet glaciologist, physical geographer, and academician (1968).

== Biography ==
=== Career ===
Kalesnik graduated from the Leningrad State University in 1929. He headed the Department of Physical Geography at his alma mater since 1950. In 1955, Stanislav Kalesnik was appointed head of the Limnology Institute of the Academy of Sciences of the Soviet Union. Kalesnik's principal works are dedicated to theoretical topics of geoscience, landscape science and glaciology, as well as geomorphology of Central Tian Shan and Dzungarian Alatau. Stanislav Kalesnik is known to have introduced several new concepts and terms, such as chionosphere (хионосфера), energy of glaciation (энергия оледенения), and geographical structure (географическая структура). In 1964, Stanislav Kalesnik was elected president of the Soviet Geographical Society. He was also the vice president of the International Geographical Union in 1968–1972. Kalesnik was an honorary doctor of the University of Cracow and University of Turku.

=== Awards and honors ===
Stanislav Kalesnik was awarded two Orders of Lenin, two Orders of the Badge of Honour, Order of the Red Banner of Labour, Order of the Red Star, and several medals. Glaciers in Trans-Ili Alatau, Dzungarian Alatau, and the Urals bear his name.
