= Volodymyrivka, Sumy Raion =

Village in Sumy Oblast, Ukraine

Volodymyrivka Володимирівка
- Village
- Interactive map of Volodymyrivka
- Location of Oleksiivka Volodymyrivka (Ukraine)
- Coordinates: 51°10′27″N 34°52′21″E
- Country: Ukraine
- Oblast: Sumy Oblast
- Raion: Sumy Raion
- Hromada: Khotin settlement hromada
- Elevation: 183 m (600 ft)

Population (2001)
  - Total: 144
- Time zone: UTC+2
  - Summer (DST): UTC+3
- Postal code: 42316
- Area code: +380 542

Volodymyrivka is a village in Ukraine, in Khotin settlement hromada, Sumy Raion, Sumy Oblast. Until 2016, the local government body was Oleksiivka Village Council.

== Geography ==
The village of Volodymyrivka is located 2 km from the villages of Novomykolaivka and Gordeyevka in Kursk Oblast, Russia. The border with Russia is 1 km away.

The Snagist River, a left tributary of the Seym River, flows through the village.

== History ==
On June 12, 2020, in accordance with the Resolution of the Cabinet of Ministers of Ukraine No. 723-r "On the Determination of Administrative Centers and Approval of Territories of Territorial Communities of Sumy Region", it became part of the Khotin settlement hromada.

On July 19, 2020, as a result of the administrative-territorial reform and liquidation of the Sumy Raion (1923—2020), the village became part of the newly formed Sumy Raion.

On July 10, 2022, the Russian army used cannon and rocket artillery to shell the villages of Volodymyrivka and Oleksiivka.

On May 29, 2025, Russian forces both entered for the first time and captured the village.

== Demographics ==
According to the 2001 Ukrainian census, the village's population was 144 people. The main languages of the village were:

- Ukrainian 97.99%
- Russian 2.01%
