= Nikolai Dokashenko =

Nikolai Grigorevich Dokashenko
- Николай Григорьевич Докашенко
- Born: 21 November 1921; Kindrativka, Kharkov Governorate, Ukrainian SSR (now part of Sumy Raion, Sumy Oblast, Ukraine)
- Died: 22 February 1992 (aged 70); Sumy, Ukraine
- Military career
- Allegiance: Soviet Union
- Branch: Soviet Air Force
- Service years: 1941 – 1960
- Rank: Colonel
- Conflicts: World War II; Soviet–Japanese War; Korean War
- Awards: Hero of the Soviet Union

Nikolai Grigorevich Dokashenko (Russian: Николай Григорьевич Докашенко; Ukrainian: Микола Григорович Докашенко 21 November 1921 – 22 February 1992) was a Soviet fighter pilot who was credited as a flying ace in the Korean War with nine shootdowns. He is also credited with two aerial victories from World War II.

== Early life ==
Dokashenko was born on 21 November 1921 to a Ukrainian family in the village of Kindrativka, now part of Sumy Raion, Sumy Oblast, Ukraine. In 1939, he completed his ninth grade and studied at a local aeroclub. Just a few days before the start of Operation Barbarossa, he entered the military, but did not see combat in World War II until June 1944; he graduated from the Chuhuiv Military Aviation School of Pilots in 1943 and was initially assigned to the 22nd Reserve Aviation Regiment. Eventually, he was transferred to the 17th Fighter Aviation Regiment, with which he flew for the remainder of the war. While on the eastern front he flew 113 sorties on the P-39 and gained two aerial victories, and after the capitulation of Nazi Germany, his regiment was transferred to the Far East, where he flew just three sorties on the P-63 during the short war with Japan. After the war, he was promoted to flight commander and became a member of the Communist Party in 1947.

== Korean War ==
Regiments of the 303rd Fighter Aviation Division were sent to Mukden, China, in March 1951 in preparation for Soviet participation in the Korean war, and in June Dokashenko experienced his baptism by fire of the Korean war. In October, he was promoted to captain and made commander of the 3rd squadron. The two previous commanders of the 3rd squadron had to be removed from their posts for incompetence, and the squadron did not gain a single aerial victory until 18 August during a flight with the regimental commander, Grigory Pulov. Before his promotion, Dokashenko gained his first credited victory in Korea on the morning of 20 September, hitting an F-86.

In October 1951, alone, he was credited with five more aerial victories, becoming considered a jet ace. The identity of the aircraft he shot down on 25 October was disputed due to the low quality of the film showing the event, but it was narrowed down to either an F6F-5 or an F4U-4. Not long after that, he was credited with shooting down three F-86s on the afternoon of 28 October. Korean war veteran Douglas K. Evans recalled a heavy dogfight from that day in his book, Sabre Jets over Korea: A Firsthand Account. Historian Igor Seidov indicated that it is likely that Dokashenko and his wingman were the MiGs described by Evans. After the incident in October, he did not score any more aerial victories until 11 December, followed by his last two victories in January and February 1952, respectively. During the conflict, he flew over 150 sorties, engaged in 45 dogfights, and was credited with nine aerial victories.

== Postwar ==
Shortly after his return to the Soviet Union, he was awarded the title Hero of the Soviet Union. In 1955, he was promoted to assistant commander of flight and tactical training in his regiment, and in April 1958, he became the deputy flight commander. He then became the head of the Kurgan DOSAAF aeroclub before retiring as lieutenant colonel in 1960. He lived in Sumy, where he worked with the Sumy Regional Committee of DOSAAF before he died on 22 February 1992.

== Awards ==
- Hero of the Soviet Union (22 April 1952)
- Order of Lenin (22 April 1952)
- Two Order of the Red Banner (6 May 1945 and 17 December 1951)
- Three Order of the Patriotic War 1st class (15 December 1944, 15 May 1945, 11 March 1985)
- Two Order of the Red Star (30 August 1945 and 30 December 1956)
