= Andriivka, Sumy Raion =

Village in Sumy Oblast, Ukraine

Andriivka Андріївка
- Village
- Interactive map of Andriivka
- Location of Andriivka Andriivka (Ukraine)
- Coordinates: 51°7′38″N 34°49′24″E
- Country: Ukraine
- Oblast: Sumy Oblast
- Raion: Sumy Raion
- Hromada: Khotin settlement hromada
- Elevation: 191 m (627 ft)

Population (2001)
  - Total: 83
  - Estimate (2025): 0
- Time zone: UTC+2
  - Summer (DST): UTC+3
- Postal code: 42316
- Area code: +380 542

Andriivka is a village in Ukraine, in Khotin settlement hromada, Sumy Raion, Sumy Oblast. Until 2016, the local government body was Oleksiivka Village Council.

== Geography ==
The village of Andriivka is located at one of the sources of the Sinyak River, at a distance of 2.5 km from the villages of Oleksiivka and Kindrativka. There is a large dam on the river.

== History ==
On June 12, 2020, in accordance with the Resolution of the Cabinet of Ministers of Ukraine No. 723-r "On the Determination of Administrative Centers and Approval of Territories of Territorial Communities of Sumy Region", it became part of the Khotin settlement hromada.

On July 19, 2020, as a result of the administrative-territorial reform and liquidation of the Sumy Raion (1923—2020), the village became part of the newly formed Sumy Raion.

=== Russo-Ukrainian War ===
On the morning of January 27, 2024, a Russian reconnaissance and sabotage group shot a brother and sister that were residents of the village.

On June 6, 2025, Russian forces both entered and captured the village. On June 23, 2025, the fighters of the Ukrainian Defense Forces recaptured the settlement from Russian troops. This was reported by analysts of the DeepState project as recaptured on June 22, 2025.

On January 8, 2026, DeepState stated that Russian forces re-entered and recaptured the village. This was confirmed by ISW, who stated that the village was seized on a prior date. On April 12, 2026, ISW confirmed the Ukraine had re-entered and recaptured the village. On May 13, Russian forces again infiltrated and later recaptured the village.

== Population ==
According to the 2001 Ukrainian census, the village's population was 83 people. The main languages of the village were:

- Ukrainian 97.67%
- Russian 2.33%

== Notable people ==
The following were born in the village:

- Marko Kononovich Likhobaba - Red Army soldier, participant in the World War II, Hero of the Soviet Union (1943).
