= Nikolai Kislyakov =

Soviet ethnologist

Nikolai Andreevich Kislyakov (1901–1973) was a Soviet ethnologist and who specialised in cultures of the Near and Middle East and Western Central Asia, particularly Persian and Tajik).

In 1937 he became head of the Department of Europe, Caucasus and Western Central Asia in the Museum of Anthropology, Archaeology and Ethnography, part of the Institute of Anthropology, Archaeology and Ethnography

== Publications ==
- Sketches on Karoteghin History Stalinabad, 1954

Preceded by Post filled by Director of the Institute of Ethnography from 1937	Director of the Peter the Great Museum of Anthropology and Ethnography; 1945–1948	Succeeded by Position void until 1990 when taken by Nikolai Girenko
