= Institute of Anthropology and Ethnography =

Russian research institute

The Institute of Anthropology and Ethnography or N.N. Miklukho-Maklai Institute of Ethnology and Anthropology (Russian: Институт этнологии и антропологии им. Н.Н. Миклухо-Маклая; abbreviated as ИЭА in Russian and IEA in English) is a Russian institute of research, specializing in ethnographic studies of cultural and physical anthropology. The institute is a constituent institute of the History branch of the Russian Academy of Sciences, with its main building on Leninsky Prospekt, Moscow. The institute is named after the 19th century ethnologist and anthropologist Nicholas Miklouho-Maclay.

== Institutional History ==
The institute was established in the Soviet Union by the amalgamation of the Museum of Anthropology and Ethnography (MAE) and the Institute for the Study of Ethnic Groups of the USSR (IPIN) in autumn 1933. Its first director was Nikolay Matorin. On 23 December 1933 he was dismissed by the Presidium of the Academy of Sciences of the USSR and replaced by Ivan Meshchaninov on 1 January 1934.

On 25 January 1935, the IAE was transformed into the Institute of Anthropology, Archaeology and Ethnography. Meshchaninov remained director until this organisation was in turn dissolved in 1937.

On 11 February 1937, the institute was restructured with sections being replaced by several departments or cabinets:

- Europe and the Caucasus, headed by Dmitrii Zelenin
- Siberia and Western Central Asia, headed by Y. P. Koshkin;
- East and South Asia, headed by Nikolay Kyuner;
- Africa, America, Australia and Oceania, headed by Isaak Vinnikov;
- Archaeology, headed by P. P. Efimenko;
- Folklore, headed by Mark Azadovsky;
- History of Religion, headed by Yury Frantsev.

The Museum of Anthropology, Archaeology and Ethnography was set up as separate part of the institute under the directorship of Dmitrii Alekseevich Olderogge. It consisted of various departments:

- Europe, Caucasus and Western Central Asia, headed by Nikolai Kislyakov;
- Siberia, headed by V. N. Chernetsov;
- India, Indonesia, and the Far East, headed by Nikolay Kyuner;
- The Early Stage of the Primeval Society, Australia and Oceania, headed by Isaak Vinnikov;
- North, Central and South America, headed by S. A. Sternberg;
- Africa, headed by Dmitrii Alekseevich Olderogge;
- Archaeology, headed by S. N. Zamyatnin;
- Physical Anthropology, headed by B. N. Vishnevskii.

On August 5, 1937, the Institute of Anthropology, Archaeology and Ethnography was renamed the Institute of Anthropology and Ethnography.

== Activities of the IAE ==
The IAE brought together ethnographers and physical anthropologists from throughout the Soviet Union to research the physical-constitutional and socio-historic development of the population. Political leaders had set the anthropologists the task of showing that "race" from the Marxist-Leninist point of view was not a significant factor in the "historical process". This was a response to the Nazi development of a "race science" (Rassenkunde) which was presented as the scientific basis for political theory and practice.

== Directors ==
- Nikolai Matorin (1933)
- Ivan Meshchaninov (1934–1937)
- Vasily Struve (1937–1940)
- I. N. Vinnikov (1940–1941)
- Saul M. Abramzon (1941–1942, acting)
- Sergei Tolstov (1942–1965)
- Yulian Bromley (1966–1989)
- Valery Tishkov (1989–2015)
- M. Yu. Martynova (2015–2018)
- R. A. Starchenko (2019, acting)
- Dmitry Funk (since 2019)

== Notes ==
- Kunstkamera
- Empire of Nations:Ethnographic Knowledge and the Making of the Soviet Union by Francine Hirsch, Cornell University Press, 2005
