= David Zolotarev =

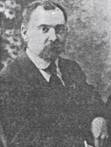
- Born: August 29, 1885; Rybinsk, Russian Empire
- Died: September 10, 1935 (aged 50); Mariinsk, Soviet Union
- Scientific career
- Fields: Anthropology, ethnography

David Alekseevich Zolotarev or Zolotaryov (Давид Алексеевич Золотарёв; August 29, 1885 – September 10, 1935) was a Russian anthropologist and ethnographer. At first he studied the subgroups of Russians living in his native Yaroslavl Governorate.

In his capacity as professor of anthropology at the University of Leningrad and as a representative of the Russian Geographical Society’s Ethnographic Division, Zolotarev led numerous anthropological expeditions, and would later report the findings in published research papers and at scientific conferences. Following the Russian Revolution, the Soviet government called on Zolotarev and other anthropologists to determine how the isolated ethnic populations of the northern Russian regions were able to adapt to the new Communist society.

During the 1920s, Zolotarev studied the Karelian population who lived at the Russian-Finnish border region. In measuring the physical characteristics and social customs of this population, Zolotarev’s findings were used by the Soviet government to determine that the Karelians could be claimed as Russians rather than as Finns.

In 1930, Zolotarev led an expedition to study the Sami, Karelians and Russians of the Lake Imandra region. Zolotarev’s studies determined that tribal tradition continued to dominate in these regions, and that the populations did not comprehend the Soviet notion of “socialist construction.”

Later in 1930, Zolotarev left the Soviet Union and attended an ethnographic conference at the Sorbonne. Upon his return from Paris, he was arrested by the Soviet police. In 1931, Zolotarev and other ethnographers were denounced by the Communist Party for not including a “class-based approach” in their research. Zolotarev was released in 1933, but was rearrested in 1935 and sent to the prison camp at Mariinsk, where he died.

After the fall of the Soviet Union, Zolotarev’s reputation in Russian anthropological studies was restored. In 2008, the Peter the Great Museum of Anthropology and Ethnography of the Russian Academy of Sciences announced it was inaugurating the research program “Tracing the D. A. Zolotarev Expedition: Ethno-cultural and migration processes in rural areas of the North-West of the Russian Federation in historical perspective.”
