= List of Russian Cities, Far and Near =

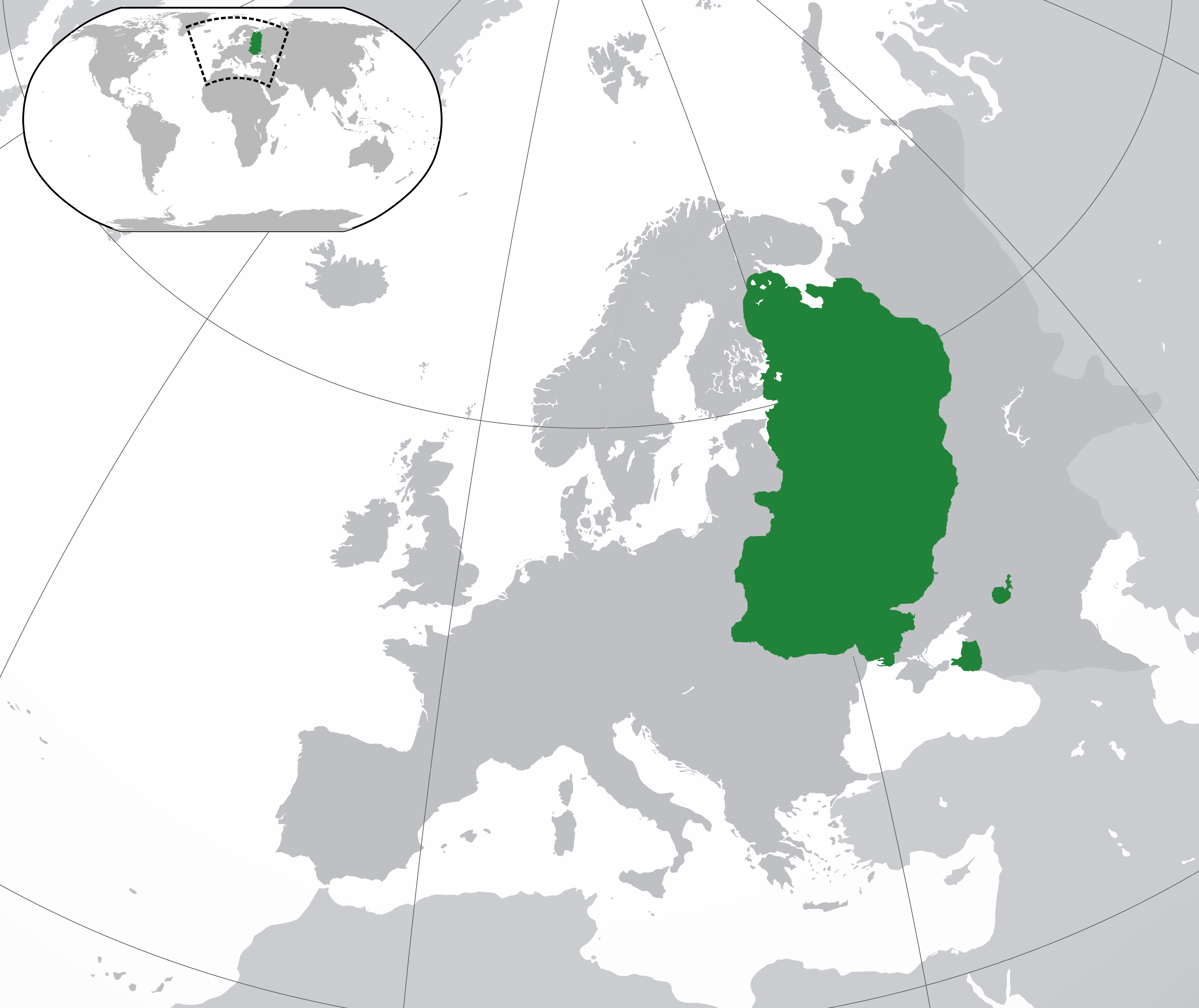
Map of the Kievan Rus', whose people were the main subject of the list

The List of Russian cities, far and near (Note: Middle Belarusian: Сьпіс рускіх гарадоў далёкіх і блізкіх; Russian: Список русских городов дальних и ближних; Middle Ukrainian: Список руських міст далеких і близьких) (Note: Sometimes also known as the List of Russian cities, near and far or List of Rusian further and closer gords) is a commonly accepted tentative title for the 14th–15th century appendix found in several manuscripts, including the Commission Scroll of the Novgorod First Chronicle (1440s), Voskresenskaia Chronicle, and Ermolinskaia Chronicle, usually prefaced with the phrase «А се имена всем градом рускым далним и ближним» ("And these are the names of all Russian cities, far and near"). It is the earliest known historical work covering the settlements of the East Slavic people, and is thus given much historical significance. While the original protograph has not been preserved, the earliest known edition is written in the Novgorod First Chronicle from the 15th century, and was later rediscovered by Russian-German historian Gerhard Friedrich Müller in the early 1760s.

== Origin ==
External image
- A map showing the location of all the identifiable cities named in 14–15th century "List of Russian cities, far and near"

The original date of the list's production is unknown, but based on certain features of the text it can be determined to have originated from the late 14th to early 15th century. Among the list of Rus' cities, some Bulgarian cities are shown as well, including ones in the region of Dobruja, which are described as being under the control of Wallachian ruler Mircea the Elder in the chronicle that the list is a part of. Mircea gave himself the title of Despot of Dobruja, and owned the region twice in history; the first time from 1390 to 1391, and the second from 1406 to 1417. Thus, based on the preceding information and other facts about the text, it can be determined that the list originates from either the late 14th century or the early 15th century. The list remained mostly unknown until the Russian-German historian Gerhard Friedrich Müller discovered it in the early 1760s, after which his colleague August Ludwig von Schlözer published it in Russian in 1816.

In total, the list names 358 cities which are sorted into 8–9 categories and ordered from south to north. The categories consist of Bulgarian and "Vlach" (an old name for Romanians, here referring to Moldavia and Wallachia), Podolian, Kievite, Volhynian, Lithuanian, Smolenskian, Ryazanite, Zalesyean, and (sometimes) Tverite. While the oldest versions of the list do not mention anything from Tver, later ones include 8 cities from it. The division of the cities into these groups appears to reflect the political boundaries of earlier times.

The question of what Rus'/Russian means in the context of these cities remains debated among historians. According to Soviet-era historian Mikhail Tikhomirov, the list proves that, by as early as the beginning of the 15th century, the Russian land concept already existed, on the basis of ethnic and linguistic similarities among the East Slavic people at the time. He bases his argument on the fact that the author omitted entirely Lithuanian and Polish settlements of various regions from the list, and explains the inclusion of Bulgarian and Moldavian settlements by their use of East Slavic languages for writing and/or liturgical purposes, emphasizing their alleged closeness and similarity to the East Slavic people historically. According to others, including Russian historian Kamil Galeev, the term Rus'/Russian in the list is not based on ethnic differences, but rather on the distribution of Old Church Slavonic. As per this perspective, the inclusion of Bulgarian and Moldavian settlements is due to religious similarities, not ethnic, and the list is essentially a collection of religiously Eastern Orthodox lands that used Old Church Slavonic as a liturgical language.

While the original author of the list is unknown, they likely were a Russian, based on the fact that the spelling of the cities in the list are entirely in their Russian forms. Additionally, the author paid great attention to cities in Zalesye, Ryazan, and Chernigov regions, suggesting that they had an origin around that area.

Is it likely that the list was originally accompanied by a map, similar to that of the 17th century Book of the Big Drawing, due to the ordering of the cities from south to north on the list, which lines up with the fact that many maps at the time placed the south at the top of the map and the north at the bottom. However, if there was ever any map attached, it has been lost by now, with only the textual portion remaining.

== Reliability ==
While historically many doubted the veracity of the list, it is today widely accepted as legitimate by historians. Nikolay M. Karamzin and most other historians at the time of its discovery treated it with distrust, due to the fact that many of the settlements in the list were unknown. However, as time went on, the views of historians began to shift. Polish ethnographer Zorian Dołęga-Chodakowski wrote a response to Karamzin, in which he pointed out various aspects of the document that appeared to confirm its authenticity. Further analysis of the text by historians led to a consensus on its legitimacy. At least 304 out of the 358 cities listed can be identified to align with settlement existing today, around 85% of the total amount.
