= Vodolahy =

Rural locality in Sumy Oblast, Ukraine

Vodolahy Водолаги
- Village
- Interactive map of Vodolahy
- Location of Vodolahy within Ukraine Vodolahy (Sumy Oblast)
- Coordinates: 51°10′38″N 34°55′14″E
- Country: Ukraine
- Oblast: Sumy Oblast
- Raion: Sumy Raion
- Hromada: Khotin settlement hromada
- Elevation: 190 m (620 ft)

Population (2001 census)
  - Total: 151
  - Estimate (2024): 33
- Time zone: UTC+2 (EET)
  - Summer (DST): UTC+3 (EEST)
- Postal code: 42311
- Area code: +380 542
- KATOTTH: UA59080290050047087

Vodolahy (Ukrainian: Водолаги; Russian: Водолаги) is a village in Khotin settlement hromada, Sumy Raion, Sumy Oblast, eastern Ukraine. It is located 30.86 kilometres (19.18 mi) north-northeast (NNE) from the centre of Sumy city and about 2.00 kilometres (1.24 mi) south of the Russian-Ukrainian border.

== History ==
=== Russian invasion of Ukraine ===
The village was captured by Russian forces in June 2025, during the full-scale Russian invasion of Ukraine.

== Demographics ==
As of the 2001 Ukrainian census, the settlement had 151 inhabitants, whose native languages were 92.11% Ukrainian and 7.89% Russian.
