= Stepne, Khotin settlement hromada =

Village in Sumy Oblast, Ukraine

Stepne Степне
- Village
- Interactive map of Stepne
- Location of Stepne Stepne (Ukraine)
- Coordinates: 51°10′34″N 34°41′5″E
- Country: Ukraine
- Oblast: Sumy Oblast
- Raion: Sumy Raion
- Hromada: Khotin settlement hromada
- Elevation: 186 m (610 ft)

Population (2001)
  - Total: 248
- Time zone: UTC+2
  - Summer (DST): UTC+3
- Postal code: 42315
- Area code: +380 542

Stepne (Ukrainian: Степне), formerly known as Leninske (Ukrainian: Ленінське), is a rural settlement in Khotin settlement hromada, Sumy Raion, Sumy Oblast, Ukraine. Until 2020, the local government body was the Kindrativka Village Council.

== Geography ==
The village is located on the banks of an unnamed drying stream, which after 5 km flows into the Kryga River. At a distance of 1 km is the village of Novokostiantynivka. The village is on the border with Russia.

== History ==
On May 19, 2016, the village was renamed as part of the decommunization policy.

On June 12, 2020, in accordance with the Resolution of the Cabinet of Ministers of Ukraine No. 723-r "On the Determination of Administrative Centers and Approval of Territories of Territorial Hromadas of Sumy Oblast", it became part of the Myropillia rural hromada.

On July 19, 2020, as a result of the administrative-territorial reform and liquidation of the Krasnopillia Raion, the village became part of the newly formed Sumy Raion.

On August 3, 2024, Russian troops shelled the village. One explosion was recorded, probably an FPV drone.

== Population ==
According to the 2001 Ukrainian census, the village's population was 248 people. The main native languages of the village were:

- Ukrainian 97.22%
- Russian 2.78%

By 2025, the population of the villlage was completely evacuated.
