= Uspenovka, Kursk Oblast =

Uspenovka Успеновка
- Village
- Interactive map of Uspenovka
- Location of Uspenovka Uspenovka (Russia)
- Coordinates: 51°12′N 34°54′E
- Country: Russia
- Federal subject: Kursk Oblast
- Administrative district: Korenevsky District
- Selsoviet: Viktorovka

Population (2010 Census)
  - Total: 71
  - Estimate (2010): 71 (0%)
- Time zone: UTC+3 (MSK)
- Postal code: 307433
- OKTMO ID: 38618412116

Uspenovka (Russian: Успеновка) is a village in western Russia, in Korenevsky District of Kursk Oblast.

== Geography ==
The village is located less than a kilometre (0.62 mi) from the Russian-Ukrainian border, 104 kilometres (65 mi) southwest of Kursk, 22 kilometres (14 mi) south of the district centre — urban-type settlement Korenevo, 3.5 kilometres (2.2 mi) from the centre of the village council — Viktorovka.

== History ==
=== Russian invasion of Ukraine ===
The settlement came under the control of the Armed Forces of Ukraine as part of the August 2024 Kursk Oblast incursion of the Russian invasion of Ukraine and was recaptured, according to the Russian Ministry of Defence, in the middle of September.
