= Sergey Oldenburg =

Russian orientalist (1863–1934)

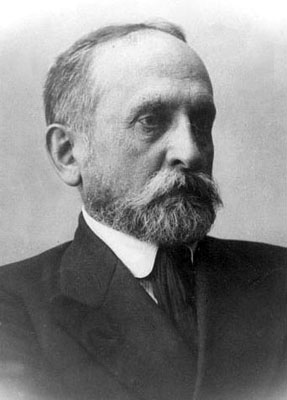
Oldenburg in 1930

Sergey Fyodorovich Oldenburg (Russian: Серге́й Фёдорович Ольденбу́рг; 26 September [O.S. 14 September] 1863 – 28 February 1934) was a Russian orientalist who specialized in Buddhist studies. He was a disciple of Ivan Minayev, the founder of Russian Indology.

== Biography ==
Sergey Feodorovitch Oldenburg was born in Russia on 26 September 1863, in Byankino, Transbaikal Oblast. His father was of the Livonian nobility; his grandfather was a full general in the Imperial Russian Army. During the 1880s while at St. Petersburg University Oldenburg participated in the Scientific-Literary Association of Students, a brotherhood which shared liberal and radical ideals. Here he met Aleksandr Ulyanov as they were both in the inner circle of this organisation. Ulyanov dropped out of the inner circle when he started to plan an assassination attempt on the life of emperor Alexander III. The attempt failed, and following the execution of Ulyanov in 1887, his brother, Vladimir Lenin visited Oldenburg in Saint Petersburg in 1891. Oldenburg had just returned from a two-year trip to London, Paris, and Cambridge.

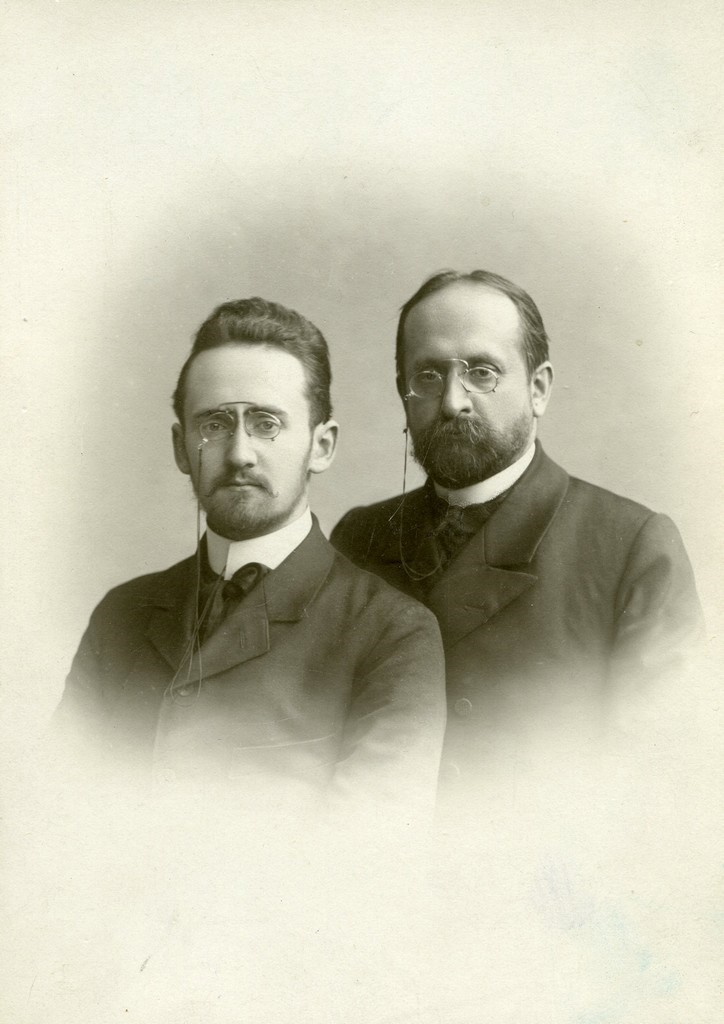
Sergei Oldenburg and his elder brother Fyodor

Oldenburg was elected to the Russian Academy of Sciences in 1900, and he served as its permanent Secretary from 1904 to 1929. From 1905 he became active in the Imperial Russian Geographical Society. In 1909–10 and 1914–15, he travelled in central Asia, where he discovered Sanskrit texts. He instigated scientific expeditions to Tibet and Dzungaria, which brought to light unique Buddhist manuscripts. To publish newly found manuscripts, in 1897 Oldenburg launched an authoritative edition of Buddhist texts, Bibliotheca Buddhica, which continues to this day.

Oldenburg joined the liberal Constitutional Democratic Party (Kadets) in 1905; he served as a member of the State Council of Imperial Russia from 1912 to 1917. Following the February Revolution of 1917 he served in the Russian Provisional Government as Minister of Education. He set up the Commission for the Study of the Tribal Composition of the Population of the Borderlands of Russia at this time. Unlike his Kadet colleagues, he stayed in Russia after the October Revolution brought the Bolsheviks to power. Based on his acquaintance with Vladimir Lenin, he was able to develop an alliance between the Bolsheviks and Russian ethnographers, the former being more interested in nationalism amongst European peoples of the former Russian Empire, the ethnographers focusing more on the national question amongst its Asian peoples.

Although he was briefly imprisoned by the Cheka in 1919, Oldenburg served as permanent secretary of the Academy of Sciences until 1929, when the Communist Party ousted hundreds of staff for resisting Bolshevization. Oldenburg devoted the remainder of his life to administrating the Soviet Institute of Oriental Studies, whose antecedent (the Asian Museum) he had directed since 1916.

He died on 28 February 1934 in St Petersburg. His son Sergei Sergeyevich Oldenburg wrote a biography of Tsar Nicholas II. His granddaughter Zoé Oldenbourg became a well-known French novelist and historian.

== Literature ==
- Masha Kirasirova: The Eastern International: Arabs, Central Asians, and Jews in the Soviet Union’s anticolonial empire, New York (NY): Oxford University Press 2024. ISBN 978-0-19-768569-3.
