= Nikolay Matorin =

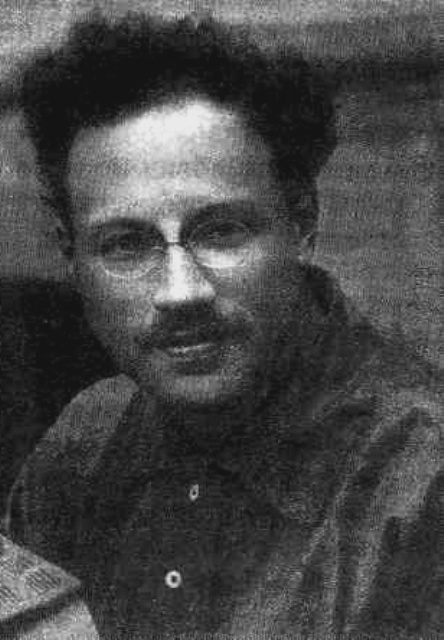
Nikolay Matorin

Nikolay Mikhaylovich Matorin (Russian: Николай Михайлович Маторин; 17 August 1898 – 11 October 1936) was a Russian Soviet ethnographer and folklorist. He lectured at the Geographic Institute in Leningrad from 1924, becoming an associate professor in the Ethnographic Department there in 1928 and professor in 1930. He specialised in religious studies and by 1930 he was appointed deputy chairman of the Committee for the Study of Ethnic Composition of USSR. After three years as director of the Peter the Great Museum of Anthropology and Ethnography (MAE) he became director of the Institute of Anthropology and Ethnography when MAE was merged with the Institute for the Study of the Narodnosti of the USSR in 1933. While director of the MAE, he was among the founders of the Museum of the History of Religion.

Matorin who aspired to create a Marxist ethnography was also critical of some of the theories of Nikolai Marr which were emposed on Soviet sciences. He was finally arrested during the Great Purge in 1935 for his connections with Grigory Zinoviev and was executed by shooting in 1936.

Preceded by Yefim Karsky	Director of the Peter the Great Museum of Anthropology and Ethnography; 1930–1936	Succeeded by Dmitry Olderogge
