= Kunstkamera =

Museum in Saint Petersburg, Russia

Coordinates: 59°56′30″N 30°18′16″E

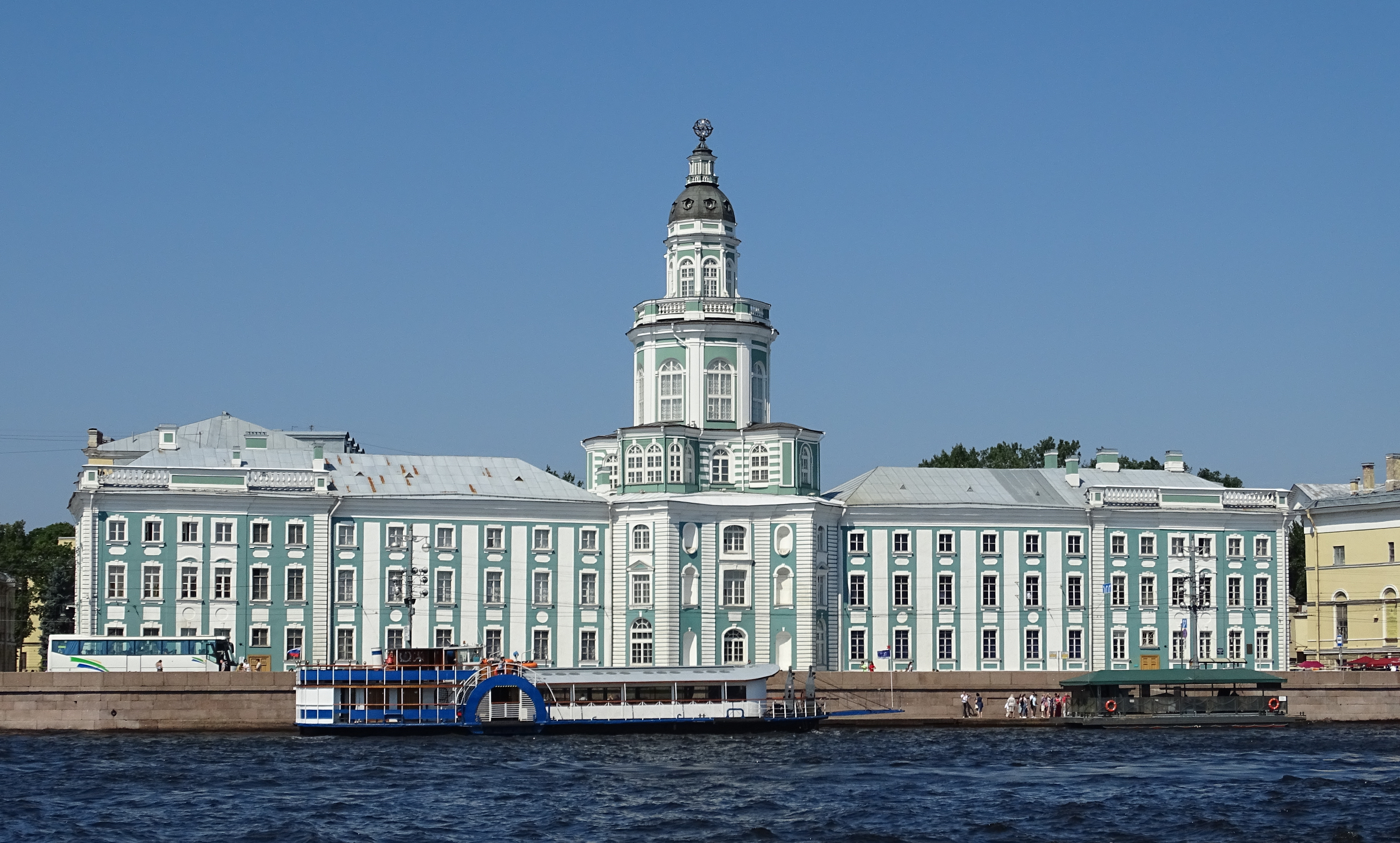
View of the Kunstkamera across the River Neva

The Kunstkamera (Russian: Кунсткамера, derived from German Kunstkammer lit. "art chamber") is a Russian public museum of science located on the Universitetskaya Embankment in Saint Petersburg, facing the Winter Palace. The Kunstkamera is formally organized as the Russian Academy of Science's Peter the Great Museum of Anthropology and Ethnography (Russian: Музей антропологии и этнографии имени Петра Великого Российской академии наук, Muzey antropologii i etnografii imeni Petra Velikogo Rossiyskoy akademii nauk) - abbreviated in Russian as the МАЭ or МАЭ РАН. Its collection was first opened at the Summer Palace by Peter the Great in 1714 as Russia's first public museum. Enlarged by purchases from the Dutch collectors Albertus Seba and Frederik Ruysch, the museum was moved to its present location in 1727. Although most known for its "grotesques," the museum houses nearly 2,000,000 items, including materials from various non-Russian countries.

The Kunstkamera is notable as a surviving example of Petrine baroque. Particularly notable is its Armillary Sphere, which crowns the spire.

== Etymology ==
The name Kunstkamera is derived from the German word kunstkammer, known in English as a cabinet of curiosities. Cabinets of curiosities were a collection of natural (naturalia) or cultural (artificialia) artifacts. Many European rulers in the early modern era kept a cabinet of curiosities. Such cabinets allowed rulers and the elite to acquire a fuller knowledge of the world and to demonstrate their control over it.

== History ==
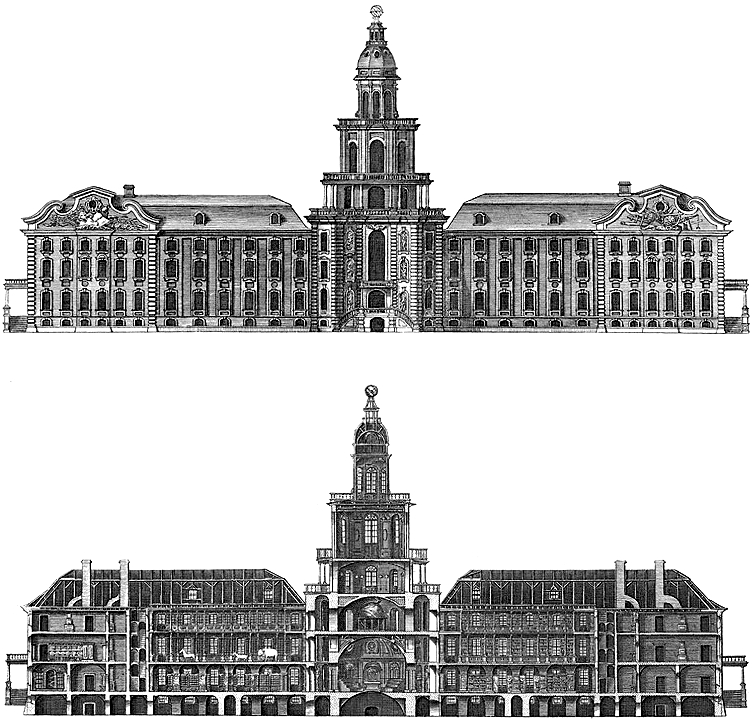
Kunstkamera in 1740

From 1697 to 1698 Peter the Great engaged in a diplomatic mission known as "the Grand Embassy." During this period Peter observed the cabinets of curiosities of various European rulers. Peter was impressed, praising these cabinets in his diary. He began to think of how to establish and promote a scientific establishment in Russia, and began amassing materials for his own cabinet. Peter's collection expanded with the purchases from men such as Levinus Vincent.

A major component of the original collection was a large assortment of human and animal fetuses with various birth defects, many of which Peter had acquired in 1697 from Ruysch and Vincent. Peter encouraged research into deformities, particularly in order to debunk superstitious fear of monsters. In particular, he issued a ukase ordering malformed stillborn infants to be sent from anywhere in Russia to the imperial collection. He subsequently had them put on show in the Kunstkamera as examples of accidents of nature.

Upon his return to Russia, Peter established in St Petersburg, the new Russian capital, an imperial cabinet of curiosities, dedicated to preserving "natural and human curiosities and rarities." Peter's personal collection was first exhibited to the public at the Summer Palace in 1714, which is used by the present museum as its founding date. Peter's main interest was in natural things rather than man-made ones. However, the first exhibit that garnered attention for the Kunstkamera was not that of natural specimen, that of the Globe of Gottorf, acquired by Peter in 1713.

During a second European tour, from 1715 to 1717, Peter visited not only cabinets of curiosities, but scientific academies. He may have visited the Ashmolean, an early example of a museum. He continued to expand his collection, including large purchases from the Dutch pharmacologist Albertus Seba in 1716 and the Dutch anatomist Frederik Ruysch in 1717. In 1717 Peter published a degree encouraging further collection throughout the Russian empire.

Peter's purchases in 1717 required him to find a new location for his collection, which had now outgrown the space allotted at the Summer Palace. Examination and organization of these collections also spurred the creation of the Russian Academy of Sciences. Expansion was further required by a third acquisition came from Jacob de Wilde, a collector of gems and scientific instruments. These purchases were largely organized by Robert Erskine, Peter's chief physician, and his secretary Johann Daniel Schumacher.

Peter decided to build the Kunstkamera on the spit of Vasilievsky Island. He called the new building The Chambers of the Saint-Petersburg Academy of Science, Library, and Kunstkamera. While the new building was constructed Peter lodged his collection in the Kikin Palace, recently confiscated from its previous owner.

The present Kunstkamera is a turreted Petrine Baroque building designed by Prussian architect Georg Johann Mattarnovy. Its foundation stone was laid in 1719 and it was fully completed in 1727. The eastern wing of the building comprised Peter's collection, while an anatomical theatre occupied the center of the building. The Globe of Gottorf and an observatory occupied a toward. The Academy of Sciences occupied the western wing of the building. Poet and scientist Mikhail Lomonosov worked in this wing. The interior was decorated with allegorical sculptures and busts of famous scientists, grouped into four categories. These sculptures were added between 1777 and 1779. From 1819 to 1825 the artist Fyodor Rikhter added paintings to the interior.

On December 5, 1747 a fire damaged the tower, destroying the original Globe of Gottorf and around 230 books, including priceless Russian manuscripts.

In the 1830s the Kunstkamera's collection was separated into different museums. These museum include the Anatomical, Zoological, Ethnographic, Botanical, and Mineralogical museums. In the 1870s scientist Karl Ernst von Baer founded a commission to investigate the possibility of reorganizing the Kunstkamera as the Museum of Anthropology and Ethnography, grounded in the Kunstkamera's Anatomical and Ethnographic museums. The commission included scientists Leopold von Schrenck, Franz Anton Schiefner, Alexander Strauch, and Filipp Ovsyannikov. Two meetings discussing the possibility took place on December 5 and December 19, 1878. On October 22, 1879, the commission received permission from Alexander II and from the State Council to fulfill the project.

By the Russian Revolution the Kunstkamera's collection included specimens collected from the expeditions of James Cook, Adam Johann von Krusenstern, Yuri Lisyansky, Fyodor Alexeyevich Golovin, Friedrich Benjamin von Lütke, Georg von Langsdorff, Nicholas Miklouho-Maclay, Matthias Castrén, Vladimir Arsenyev, and Sergey Oldenburg and others.

== Museum of Anthropology and Ethnography ==
In the 1830s, the Kunstkamera collections were dispersed to newly established imperial museums, the most important being the Peter the Great Museum of Anthropology and Ethnography, established in 1879. It has a collection approaching 2,000,000 items and has been known as the Peter the Great Museum since 1903 in order to distinguish it from the Russian Museum of Ethnography. In 1747 some objects were lost in a fire.

=== List of directors ===
- Leopold Schrenk (1879–94)
- Vasily Radlov (1894–1918)
- Vasily Bartold (1918–21)
- Yefim Karskiy (1921–30)
- Nikolay Matorin (1930–36)
- Dmitry Olderogge (1935–40)
- Nikolai Kislyakov (1940–48)
- Leonid Potapov (1948–1967)
- Lyudmila Saburova (1967–1982)
- Rudolf Its (1982–1990)
- Nikolai Girenko (1991–92)
- Alexander Myl'nikov (1992–97)
- Chuner Taksami (1997–2001)
- Yuri Chistov (2001–17)
- Andrey Golovnyov (2017–)

== See also ==
- List of museums in Saint Petersburg
- Globe of Gottorf (one of the museum's main artistic pieces)
- Pushkin House (occupied the rooms in the Kunstkamera building in 1905–27)
