= Novokostiantynivka, Sumy Oblast =

Village in Sumy Oblast, Ukraine

Novokostiantynivka Новокостянтинівка
- Village
- Interactive map of Novokostiantynivka
- Location of Novokostiantynivka Novokostiantynivka (Ukraine)
- Coordinates: 51°9′52″N 34°43′5″E
- Country: Ukraine
- Oblast: Sumy Oblast
- Raion: Sumy Raion
- Hromada: Khotin settlement hromada
- Elevation: 196 m (643 ft)

Population (2001)
  - Total: 25
- Time zone: UTC+2
  - Summer (DST): UTC+3
- Postal code: 42315
- Area code: +380 542

Novokostiantynivka is a village in Ukraine, in Khotin settlement hromada, Sumy Raion, Sumy Oblast. Until 2016, the local government body was Oleksiivka Village Council.

== Geography ==
The village of Novokostiantynivka is located on the border with Russia, 1 km from the village of Stepne.

== History ==
On June 12, 2020, in accordance with the Resolution of the Cabinet of Ministers of Ukraine No. 723-r "On the Determination of Administrative Centers and Approval of Territories of Territorial Communities of Sumy Region", it became part of the Khotin settlement hromada.

On July 19, 2020, as a result of the administrative-territorial reform and liquidation of the Sumy Raion (1923—2020), the village became part of the newly formed Sumy Raion.

On August 26, 2024, during the Russo-Ukrainian War, Russian forces shelled the border territories of Sumy Oblast. A single explosion was recorded in the village, which is believed to be a KAB.

On September 19, 2024, the Verkhovna Rada supported the renaming of the village of Pershe Travnya to Novokostiantynivka. The renaming came into effect on September 26, 2024.

On August 24, 2026, Russian forces claimed to have seized the settlement., which Ukrainian sources deny.

== Demographics ==
According to the 2001 Ukrainian census, the village's population was 136 people. The main languages of the village were:

- Russian 53.85%
- Ukrainian 46.15%
