= Russian Geographical Society =

Russian learned society

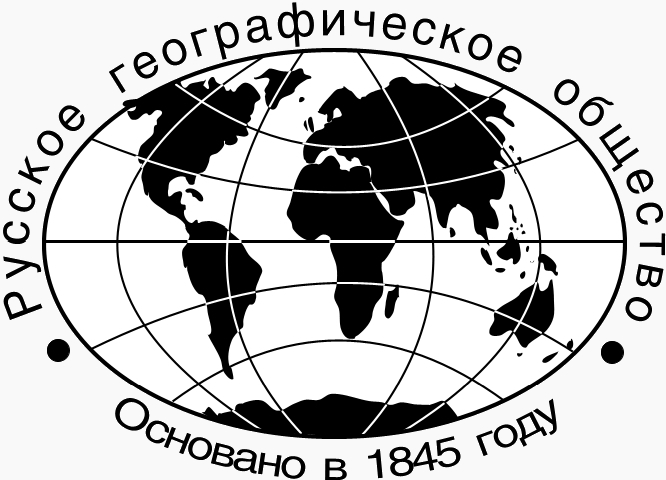
- Founded: 18 September 1845
- Type: NGO
- Purpose: Collect and disseminate reliable geographical information
- Location: Saint Petersburg, Russia
- Region served: Russian Federation
- Key people: President Sergey Shoygu; Vice President Artur Chilingarov; Head of Trustees Vladimir Putin
- Website: www.rgo.ru

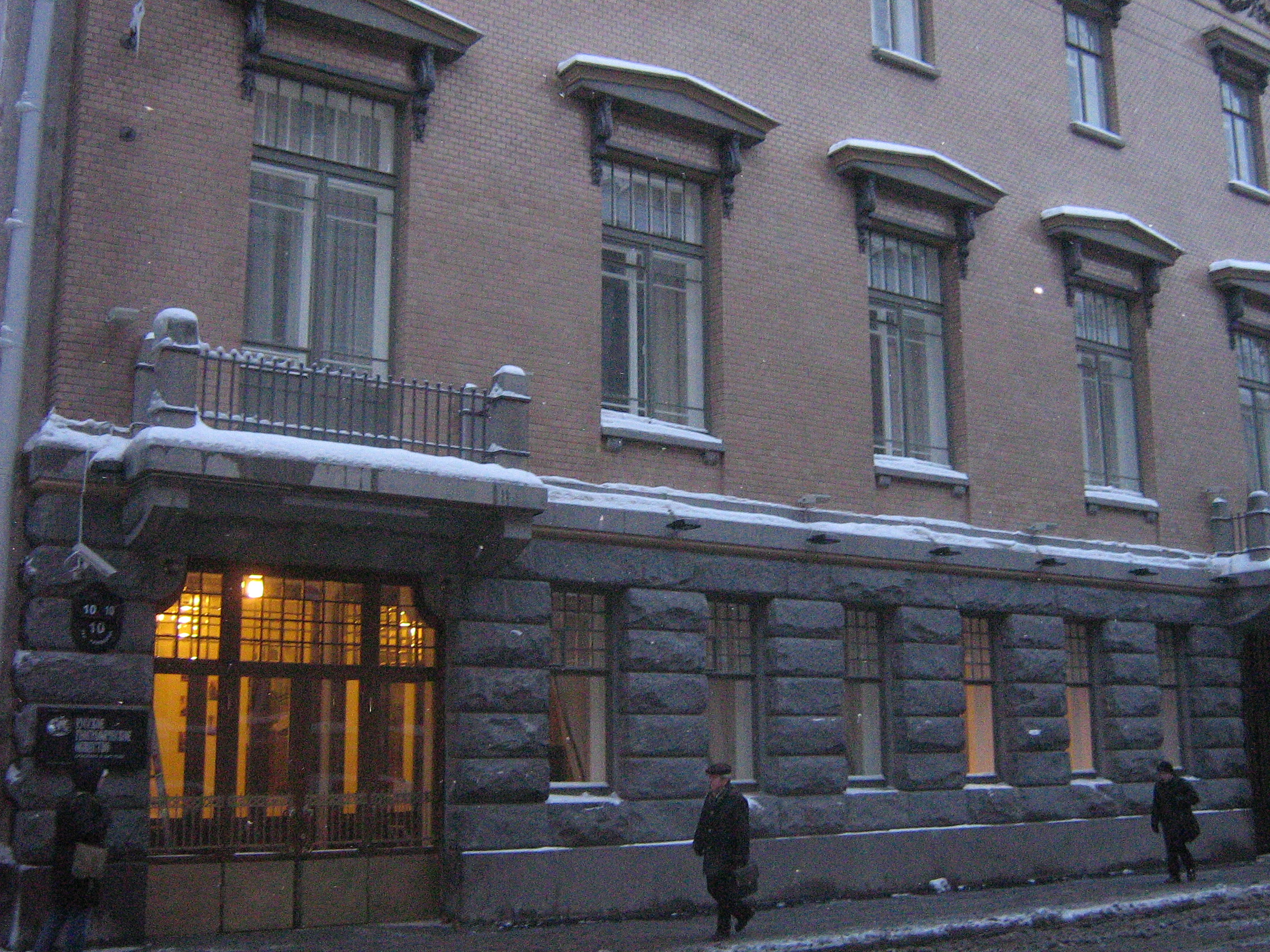
Headquarters of the Russian Geographical Society

The Russian Geographical Society (Russian: Ру́сское географи́ческое о́бщество (РГО)), or RGO, is a learned society based in Saint Petersburg, Russia. It promotes geography, exploration and nature protection with research programs in fields including oceanography, ethnography, ecology and statistics.

== History ==
=== Imperial Geographical Society ===
The society was founded in Saint Petersburg, Russia, on 6 (18) August 1845. Prior to the Russian Revolution of 1917, it was known as the Imperial Russian Geographical Society.

The order to establish the society came directly from Emperor Nicholas I. The motive for the establishment was to encourage geographical research on domestic topics, which has later been described as a Russian nationalist political goal.

The filial societies were established at the Caucasus (1850), Irkutsk (1851), Vilnius (1867), Orenburg (1868), Kiev (1873), Omsk (1877), and other cities.

The society organized and funded the expeditions of Richard Maack, Pyotr Kropotkin, Semyonov-Tyan-Shansky, Nikolai Przhevalsky, Nikolai Miklukho-Maklai, Pyotr Kozlov, Vladimir Obruchev, and Lev Berg. It helped set up the first polar stations in Russia and was one of the first to publish detailed studies of the Russian folklore and Ukrainian fairs.

The society pioneered the systematic exploration of the Northern Urals in 1847–1850, of the farthest reaches of the Amur River in 1854–1863, of the vast areas of Kashgaria, Dzungaria, and Mongolia from the 1870s onward.

By 1917 the RGO was composed of eleven subdivisions and 1,000 members.

==== Members and presidents ====
The founding members of the Imperial Russian Geographical Society included:

- Konstantin Arseniev
- Friedrich (Fyodor) von Berg
- Karl Ernst von Baer
- Ferdinand von Wrangel
- Platon Chikhachov
- Vladimir Dal
- Gregor von Helmersen
- Peter von Köppen
- Adam Johann (Ivan) von Krusenstern
- Alexey Levshin
- Fyodor Litke
- Mikhail Muravyov-Vilensky
- Vladimir Odoyevsky
- Vasily Alekseevich Perovsky
- Pyotr Ivanovich Ricord
- Mikhail Vronchenko
- Friedrich Georg Wilhelm (Vasily) von Struve

The society's official presidents were Grand Duke Konstantin Nikolayevich of Russia in 1845–1892 and Grand Duke Nicholas Mikhailovich of Russia in 1892–1917, but it was actually run by the vice-presidents: Fyodor Litke (1845–1850, 1855–1857), Count Mikhail Muravyov (1850–1857), Pyotr Semyonov-Tyan-Shansky (1873–1914), and Yuly Shokalsky (1914–1931).

==== Constantine Medal ====
The Constantine Medal was a gold medal worth 200 silver roubles and was the highest award of the Imperial Russian Geographical Society. It was established and named after the society's first chairman, Great Duke Constantine and was awarded from 1849 to 1929 to explorers who had made a significant geographical discovery or to authors of outstanding publications in geography, ethnography or Russian statistics. From 1924 to 1929 the Medal was referred to as “The highest award of the Russian Geographical Society”.

Recipients of the medal included:

- 1849 Ernst Reinhold von Hofmann, for his excellent work during the first expedition of the Russian Geographical Society to the Northern Urals (first award)
- 1858 Ivan Aksakov, for his research into trade fairs in Ukraine
- 1859 Ludwig Schwarz
- 1863 Vladimir Dahl, for the Explanatory Dictionary of the Russian Language
- 1864 Ivashintsov Nikolay Alekseevich, for his long-term efforts to research the Caspian Sea
- 1874 Nikolay Przhevalsky, for his pre-eminent scientific research, geographical discoveries and travels to Mongolia and the Tangut land
- 1878 Adolf Erik Nordensheld, for his voyage and research in the Arctic Ocean along the northern coast of Western and Eastern Siberia
- 1880 Ivan Mushketov, geologist and engineer, explorer of Central Asia
- 1898 Dr Gustav Radde
- 1900 Vladimir Obruchev, for his publications on Asian geology
- 1902 Pyotr Kozlov, for the 1899–1901 expedition to Tibet
- 1905 Alexander Kolchak, for participation in Baron E. Toll's expedition, and for the journey to Bennett Island in particular
- 1905 Friedrich Schmidt
- 1907 Grigory Grum-Grshimailo, for all his works in Asian geography and for his Description of a Journey in Western China Volume III
- 1907 Fridtjof Nansen, for his remarkable feats, which constitute a whole era in the Arctic Ocean exploration
- 1914 Boris Vilkitsky, for hydrographic expeditions in the Arctic Sea.

=== All-Union Geographical Society ===
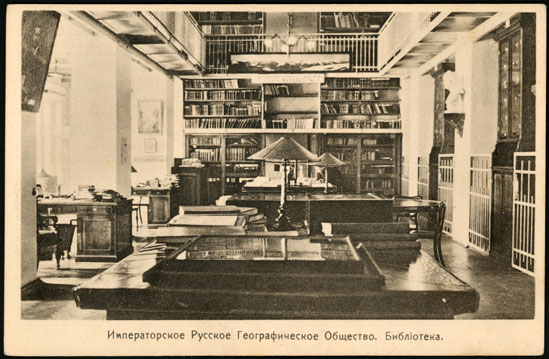
Library of the Russian Geographical Society in 1916

The society changed its name to the State Geographical Society in 1926 and to the Geographical Society of the USSR in 1938. After Shokalsky its presidents were geneticist Nikolai Vavilov (1931–1940), zoologist Lev Berg (1940–1950), parasitologist Evgeny Pavlovsky (1952–1964), glaciologist Stanislav Kalesnik (1964–1977), and polar explorer Aleksei Treshnikov (1977–1991). The society has convened numerous congresses and has awarded four types of medals, the tri-annual Grand Gold Medal, three bi-annual medals named after Litke, Semyonov, and Przhevalsky, and also the bi-annual Semen Dezhnev prize. By 1970, it had published more than 2,000 volumes of geographical literature, including the annual Zapiski (since 1846) and Izvestiya (since 1865).

=== Post-Soviet era ===
The society reverted to its original name upon the dissolution of the Soviet Union in 1991. The main offices of the society are in Saint Petersburg.

Since 2002 the society has sponsored an annual seasonal ice base in the Arctic, Camp Barneo.

In 2009, the Minister of Defence of Russia Sergei Shoigu was elected the president of the society. As of March 2022, he is still in office. In 2010, the board of trustees of the society was established. The president of Russia Vladimir Putin was appointed chairman of the board. Other board members included Russian oligarchs, politicians and Albert II, Prince of Monaco. The appointments of Shoigu and Putin resulted in the society getting more subsidies from the Russian state.

The 2022 Russian invasion of Ukraine led to BP CEO Bernard Looney's resignation as a trustee of the society, and membership of Russia within the International Geographical Union (IGU) was suspended as of 7 March 2022, pending a formal decision on its membership at the next IGU General Assembly in July 2022. Nevertheless, while suspending Russia's formal membership, the IGU maintains an open door for continued engagement with colleagues in Russia.

In October 2023, an investigation by Current Time TV revealed that two people purporting to be employees of the RGS tried to recruit a Norwegian citizen as a spy.

== Divisions ==
The Imperial Society comprised four departments: Physical Geography, Mathematical Geography, Ethnography, and Statistics.

Nikolai Nadezhdin was involved in the foundation of the Ethnography department, when the RGO was originally set up. During the 1850s and 1860s the ethnographic division gathered and published material such as works of folklore and the byt or "way of life" which they regarded as reflecting the "essence" of the indigenous people of the Russian Empire. In 1909 Dmitry Nikolayevich Anuchin, Vladimir Bogdanov and Vsevolod Miller convened the ethnographic sub-section of the Twelfth Congress of Russian Natural Scientists and Physicians held in Moscow. Here they pushed for more professionalism to distinguish ethnographers from missionaries and amateurs. In 1917 David Zolotarev and Nikolai Mogilyansky of the RGO participated in the Commission for the Study of the Tribal Composition of the Population of the Borderlands of Russia.

== See also ==
- List of geography awards
- List of Russian explorers
