= Sumsky Uyezd =

- Former subdivision of the Russian Empire
- 1780–1923
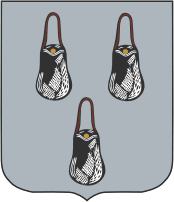
- Coat of arms

- Capital: Sumy
- History
  - Established: 1780
  - Disestablished: 1923
Preceded by
Sumy Regiment

Sumsky Uyezd (Russian: Сумский уезд) or Sumy Povit (Ukrainian: Сумський повіт) was one of the subdivisions of the Kharkov Governorate of the Russian Empire. It was situated in the northwestern part of the governorate. Its administrative centre was Sumy.

== Demographics ==
At the time of the Russian Empire Census of 1897, Sumsky Uyezd had a population of 228,094. Of these, 91.9% spoke Ukrainian, 7.0% Russian, 0.4% Yiddish, 0.2% German, 0.2% Polish, 0.1% Belarusian and 0.1% Tatar as their native language.

== Notable people ==
- Peter Leopold von Schrenck (1826–1894), zoologist, geographer and ethnographer
