= Hryhorii Makhno =

Ukrainian anarcho-communist (1886–1920)

- Григорій Махно
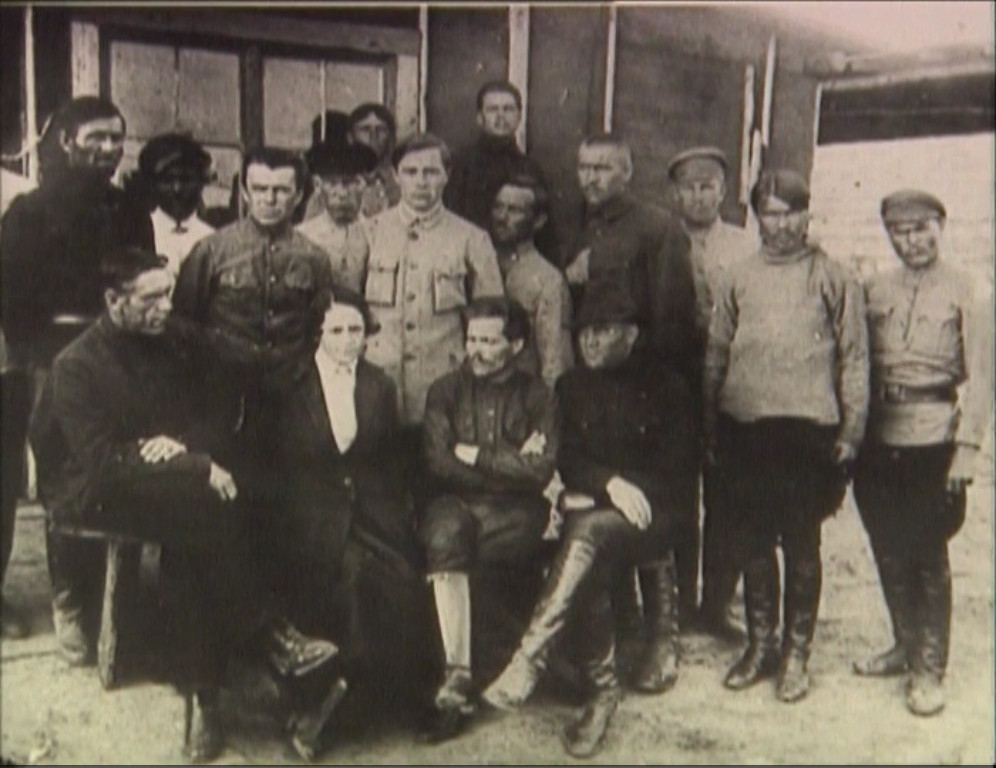
- possibly Hyhorii Makhno in 1919, standing first row second from right
- Born: 24 January 1886; Huliaipole, Alexandrovsky Uyezd, Yekaterinoslav Governorate, Russian Empire
- Died: 18 September 1919 (aged 33); Pomichna, Kherson Governorate, South Russia
- Military career
- Allegiance: Russian Empire (1907-1917); DKRSR (1918); RSFSR (1918-1919); Makhnovshchina (1919)
- Branch: Imperial Russian Army (1907-1917); Black Guards (1918); Red Army (1918-1919); Revolutionary Insurgent Army of Ukraine (1919)
- Service years: 1907–1919
- Rank: Brigade commander
- Conflicts: World War I; Russian Civil War; Battle of Tsaritsyn; Ukrainian War of Independence

Hryhorii Ivanovych Makhno (Ukrainian: Григорій Іванович Махно; 24 January 1886 – 18 September 1919) was a Ukrainian rebel commander and brother of Nestor Makhno.

== Biography ==
Hryhorii was born into a peasant family in the village of Huliaipole on 24 January 1886 to Ivan Rodionovych Mikhnenko and Evdokiia Matveevna Perederyi. His father died in 1889, leaving he and his brothers in the sole care of their mother. Hryhorii was married to a peasant woman Khristina, with whom he had two daughters: Maria and Elizabeth.

In 1907, he joined the anarcho-communist Union of Poor Peasants. When his brother Nestor Makhno was arrested for participating in the group, Hryhorii visited him in prison and told him of the death of their comrade Oleksandr Semenyuta. In the same year he was drafted into the Imperial Russian Army, in which he fought during World War I.

In 1918 he took part in the defense of the Donets-Krivoy Rog Soviet Republic as part of an anarcho-communist detachment, with which he retreated to Tsaritsyn. In Tsaritsyn, Hryhorii was appointed chief of staff of the 37th Brigade of the Red Army on the Tsaritsyn front.

In the spring of 1919, he returned to his native Huliaipole and joined the Revolutionary Insurgent Army of Ukraine (RIAU). When the Insurgents separated from the Red Army and began their retreat westward, Hryhorii joined the small detachment around his brother Nestor. For some time Hryhorii served as the chief of staff of the united rebel troops of Nestor Makhno and Nykyfor Hryhoriv, then as a member of the Military Revolutionary Council (VRS).

In early September 1919, the Insurgents clashed with the White movement around Pomichna, with the insurgent cavalry carrying out a series of raids into the White rear. According to Peter Arshinov, on 18 September 1919, Hryhorii Makhno was killed in battle with the Whites, alongside Petya Lyuty. After receiving news of his brother's death, an enraged Nestor responded by massacring the wounded White officers that the insurgents had captured.

== Memory ==
Following the Insurgent victory over the Whites at the battle of Peregonovka, the insurgents captured an armored train, which they dubbed the “Memory of Hryhorii Makhno”. "Armored train in memory of the freedom fighter comrade Hryhorii Makhno" was written in red paint on the armored train, over the old inscription.

== Bibliography ==
- Bilash, Oleksandr Viktorovych; Bilash, Viktor Fedorovych (1993). Дороги Нестора Махно (in Russian). Kyiv: РВЦ "Проза". ISBN 9785770738148. OCLC 429142607.
- Danilov, Viktor Petrovich (2006). Нестор Махно: Крестьянское движение на Украине, 1918—1921 : Документы и материалы (PDF) (in Russian). Moscow: ROSSPEN. ISBN 9785824307696. OCLC 741204339.
- Malet, Michael (1982). Nestor Makhno in the Russian Civil War. London: Palgrave Macmillan. ISBN 978-0-333-25969-6. OCLC 8514426.
- Peters, Victor (1970). Nestor Makhno: The Life of an Anarchist. Winnipeg: Echo Books. OCLC 7925080.
- Serohin, Serhiy (1998). Третій шлях [The Third Way] (PDF) (in Ukrainian). Huliaipole: Гуляйпільська друкарня.
- Skirda, Alexandre (2004) [1982]. Nestor Makhno–Anarchy's Cossack: The Struggle for Free Soviets in the Ukraine 1917–1921. Translated by Sharkey, Paul. Oakland: AK Press. ISBN 978-1-902593-68-5. OCLC 60602979.
