= Ivan Chuchko =

Ukrainian military commander (1889–1919)

- Іван Чучко
- Born: 1889; Huliaipole, Oleksandrivsky, Katerynoslav, Russian Empire
- Died: 20 August 1919 (aged 29–30); Novyi Buh, Kherson, South Russia
- Military career
- Allegiance: Russian Empire (1914-1917); Makhnovshchina (1918-1919)
- Service: Imperial Russian Army (1914-1917); Revolutionary Insurgent Army of Ukraine (1918-1919)
- Service years: 1914–1919
- Conflicts: World War I; Ukrainian War of Independence †

Ivan Chuchko (1889–1919) was a military commander in the Revolutionary Insurgent Army of Ukraine.

== Biography ==
Ivan Chuchko was born into a peasant family in Huliaipole and received no education. As a teenager, he became enlisted into the Imperial Russian Army and took part in the World War I. He joined the Makhnovist movement in 1918 during its early period of expansion.

In February 1919, he took part in the Congress of representatives from peasant and workers' councils, sub-departments, headquarters and front-line soldiers, which was held in Huliaipole. At this congress, Ivan was elected a member of the Military Revolutionary Council of the RIAU. By mid-1919, Chuchko commanded the 2nd artillery division of the Makhnovist army, leading the arillery during fighting against the White movement. Before rising to divisional command, he had served as a battery commander within the insurgent artillery arm, and participated in the formation of the movement's early artillery units. His unit took part in the fighting against the White movement in the spring and summer of 1919.

In June 1919, after the unification of the Makhnovists with the green army of Nykyfor Hryhoriv, the council was reorganized into the Military Revolutionary Council of the rebel army, and Ivan was elected to the headquarters of the RIAU as head of the administrative unit.

He was killed by the White Guards on 20 August 1919 in the Novyi Buh area after the collapse of the insurgent front under pressure from Anton Denikin's forces.

== Bibliography ==
- Belash, Alexander; Belash, Victor (1993). Дороги Нестора Махно (in Russian). Kyiv: РВЦ "Проза". ISBN 5770738146. OCLC 429142607.
- Danilov, Victor Petrovich; Shanin, T. (2006). Нестор Махно: Крестьянское движение на Украине. 1918—1921: Документы и материалы. Крестьянская революция в России. 1902—1922 гг.: Документы и материалы (in Russian). Moscow: ROSSPEN. p. 1000. ISBN 5824307695. OCLC 741204339.
