= Union of Poor Peasants =

20th-century Ukrainian anarchist organization

- Спілка бідних хліборобів
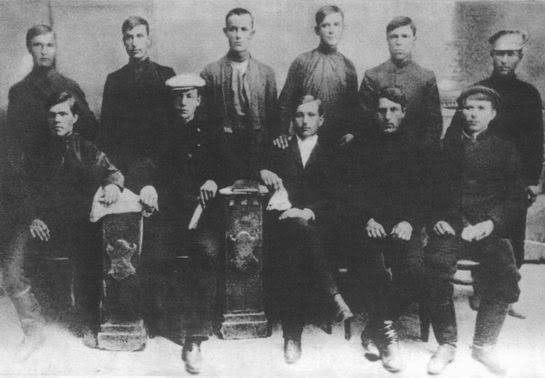
- Nestor Makhno (sitting in the front row, first from the left) with other members of the Union of Poor Peasants on May 1, 1907.
- Leaders: Voldemar Antoni; Oleksandr Semenyuta
- Dates active: 22 January 1905 – 27 August 1908
- Dissolved: March 1910
- Country: Russian Empire
- Headquarters: Huliaipole
- Active regions: Huliaipole and surrounding area, Ukraine
- Ideology: Anarcho-communism; Insurrectionary anarchism
- Political position: Far-left
- Size: c. 50

The Union of Poor Peasants (Ukrainian: Спілка бідних хліборобів), also known as the Peasant Group of Anarcho-Communists or the Huliaipole Anarchist Group, was an underground Ukrainian anarchist organization, operating in the years 1905–1908 in and around the area of Huliaipole in what is today Ukraine.

== Foundation ==
During the 1905 Revolution, a wave of anarchist activity erupted throughout Ukraine, with strike actions and soviets being organized in major cities, while militant groups such as the Black Banner carried out acts of terrorism against the Russian Empire. But with the defeat of the revolution and the institution of reforms by the Russian prime minister Pyotr Stolypin, anarchists in the small southern Ukrainian town of Huliaipole began to consider a violent struggle against the Tsarist police to be their most immediate task.

In 1906, a Ukrainian Czech teacher called Voldemar Antoni began to share his anarchist political philosophy with former schoolmates in his hometown of Huliaipole, going on to establish a local anarcho-communist group: the Union of Poor Peasants. The group attracted about a dozen core members, mostly from the region's peasantry, with new arrivals going through a probationary period of political education before becoming full members. The group was swiftly joined by Oleksandr Semenyuta, a local peasant that had gone into clandestinity after committing draft evasion, who became the main supplier of the group's weaponry.

== Criminal activity (1906-1908) ==
Between September 1906 and July 1908, the group carried out a series of armed robberies and assassinations.

On 18 September [O.S. 5 September] 1906, the group carried out its first robbery against a local merchant known as Pelshchiner, during which three armed members surrounded his house and forced him to hand over his cash and jewellery.

The group carried out a second robbery on 23 October [O.S. 10 October] 1906, stealing 500 rubles from a local nationalist poet Hryts’ko Kernerenko. They spent this money on a second-hand hectograph, which they used to print their own leaflets, attacking Stolypin's reforms and railing against the kulaks.

On 26 November [O.S. 13 November] 1906, they carried out their third robbery against the local industrialist Mark Kerner, who was robbed of his cash and a silver ingot by seven group members, some of whom he reported had been shaking with nerves. They sent him a letter two days later, regretting that they hadn't been able to steal even more of his money and threatening to bomb his home if he continued to inform the police of their activities.

Following the arrest of some of their members, including the young Nestor Makhno, the group decided to lie low for the remainder of the winter. In August 1907, they regrouped and went to Haichul in order to carry out their fourth robbery against a merchant called Gurevich. During the night, four armed group members broke into his house and demanded money, identifying themselves as anarcho-communists, but Gurevich's nephew cried out for help, forcing them to escape without any loot.

On 1 November [O.S. 19 October] 1907, they carried out another robbery against a post office cart, during which they killed a local police officer. In compensation for his death, the group left 100 rubles of the stolen money with the officer's widow.

The police were initially unable to identify the assailants, but an imprisoned member of the union in Katerynoslav informed them of the anarchists' identities: Voldemar Antoni had planned the attack and provided the weapons, while the attack itself had been carried out by Nestor Makhno, Anton Bondarenko and Prokip Semenyuta, who had also participated in other robberies. Makhno himself was subsequently arrested on charges of murder and expropriation, but he was quickly released due to lack of evidence.

Despite the growing police investigation into their activities, the anarchists continued. On 23 April [O.S. 10 April] 1908, Ivan Levadny and Naum Altgauzen led a raid on Bogodarovsk, robbing a merchant named Levin of his cash and gold. On 26 May [O.S. 13 May] 1908, the gang attempted to rob another merchant but failed to steal any money, escaping after the merchant's daughter was wounded by their gunfire. On 22 June [O.S. 9 June] 1908, the gang raided a state-owned liquor store in Novoselivka, during which a retail clerk was shot and killed.

== Capture and trial (1908-1910) ==
After the group assassinated a police informant, the authorities began to actively hunt for members of the group. Half of the group went underground and continued their activities in clandestinity, while other members were arrested. Aided by informants, the police found out that the group had scheduled a meeting at the house of Ivan Levadny for 10 August [O.S. 28 July] 1908. Ten policeman surrounded the house and a shoot-out ensued, during which the commanding officer of the police was killed. The anarchists managed to escape into the night, but Prokip Semenyuta had been wounded in the leg and decided to shoot himself, in order to not slow down his fleeing comrades. Makhno and Oleksandr Semenyuta subsequently attempted a number of attacks against the provincial governor, but these were all aborted and the group members fled in shoot-outs with the police.

Karachentsev, the chief of police in Huliaipole, responded by executing a series of arrests of the group members, despite still lacking sufficient evidence against them. He tracked down a number of anarchists that were hiding in Katerynoslav, capturing Altgauzen, Lisovski, Levadny and Zuichenko. During their interrogation, Levadny broke under pressure and informed the police of the group's entire history, while Altgauzen also confessed to participating in a number of robberies, for which he was later accused by Makhno of being an agent provocateur. Following Zuichenko's confession, even more anarchists were arrested and the group was finally brought to trial.

The trial provided Karachentsev with the necessary information to arrest even more of Huliaipole's anarchists, including Nestor Makhno. Although other group members ended up confessing, Makhno staunchly denied all charges against him. But on 14 September [O.S. 1 September] 1908, a number of Makhno's notes were intercepted, one of which instructed Levadny not to incriminate their comrades and another which detailed plans to escape prison. Testimony from witnesses, including Shevchenko's own brother, further incriminated the group members. Having been identified as the group's leaders, Voldemar Antoni and Oleksandr Semenyuta fled to Belgium, where they plotted their next moves.

Despite many of the group's members recanting their confessions, claiming they were under duress, Zuichenko's subsequent confession incriminated all of them, with one of the group members being hanged on 30 June [O.S. 17 June] 1909 and another dying from typhus while imprisoned. Transferred to Oleksandrivsk, the accused were kept in prison for a year while the prosecution continued their investigations. With the threat of capital punishment hanging over their heads, a number of group members tried and failed to escape prison during the winter of 1909. But Makhno only lasted two days before his recapture and Levadny died in a snowstorm. It was around this same time that Oleksandr Semenyuta returned to Huliaipole from his Belgian exile. Seeking revenge for his brother's death, Semenyuta assassinated Karachentsev after he left the local theatre. With a bounty on his head, Semenyuta managed to elude capture for nearly a year, but he was surrounded at his house by police and shot himself in order to avoid capture.

In March 1910, the prisoners were transferred to Katerynoslav for their court-martial by the Odessa Military District. Charged with expropriation, illegal association and illegal assembly, sixteen of the group's members were all found guilty and sentenced to death. Although, after 52 days on death row, Makhno's sentence was commuted to life imprisonment due to his young age (21). Makhno was subsequently transferred to Butyrskaya prison, where he came under the wing of Peter Arshinov and received a comprehensive education from him. Makhno and his fellow prisoners were finally released during the February Revolution, following which Makhno returned to Huliaipole.

== Revolutionary activity (1916-1919) ==
With most of their comrades in prison, dead or exiled, the few remaining members were only able to reconstitute the group in May 1916. The reformed group subsequently shifted their focus toward propaganda, which they carried out up until the outbreak of the 1917 Revolution. On the first day of the February Revolution, the group led a procession of black flags to the graves of their fallen comrades, including Prokip and Oleksandr Semenyuta.

On 24 March, Makhno arrived back in Huliaipole, where he was greeted by the group's surviving members. Makhno struggled to persuade many of the group's members on his organizational tactics, as many of them still wished to focus on the distribution of propaganda, but he quickly won them over to his plan. By the following week, he had established a broad-based Peasant Union and was elected as its chairman, enrolling almost all of the town's peasantry within the space of a few days. When the local organ of the Russian Provisional Government, known as the Public Committee, held elections in early April, it was brought under the control of member and sympathisers of the Peasant Union. This accelerated the pace of the revolution in Huliaipole, as local peasants and workers seized control of land and industry, establishing a network of agricultural communes throughout the region. Inspired by the work of the Catalan pedagogue Francesc Ferrer i Guàrdia, the group also set about reforming the local education system. Makhno himself raided the local police archives and discovered the identity of the police informants that had given away the group in 1908, eventually finding the informant known as Sharovsky and having him shot.

Within months, the Provisional Government representatives had been driven out of town and the participation of the peasantry in local affairs dramatically increased. In August 1917, Makhno went to Katerynoslav, where he attended the Provincial Congress of Soviets and Peasant Unions as the delegate for Huliaipole. The congress decided that the Peasant Unions of Katerynoslav province were to be reorganized into soviets. In the wake of the October Revolution, the Huliaipole Soviet organized support for the Ukrainian People's Republic of Soviets, which brought southern Ukraine under "soviet power". But following the ratification of the Treaty of Brest-Litovsk, Ukraine was invaded by the Central Powers.

By this time, tensions between the anarchists and Ukrainian nationalists had heightened. When one member of the Ukrainian Socialist-Revolutionary Party threatened the anarchists with retribution, the anarchist group responded by murdering him. Makhno attempted to heal the divisions by setting up a joint commission of both anarchists and nationalists, but this alienated younger group members, who saw it as a compromise with "counter-revolutionaries". In response, Makhno proposed that the group form a revolutionary vanguard and take a leading role in combatting the counter-revolution. They subsequently organized peasant detachments to resist the invasion, but after they were dispatched, the Union of Poor Peasants was deposed in a coup by Ukrainian nationalists and the town fell under the control of the Austro-Hungarian Army. The coup was aided by one of the group's former members, Lev Schneider, who had joined the nationalist cause.

In April 1918, Ukrainian anarchist partisans regrouped in Taganrog, where they held a conference to discuss the situation and how they could respond. Makhno urged the Union of Poor Peasants that had remained in Huliaipole to resist the occupation and to once again raise their flag, which read "Always with the oppressed against the oppressors." The partisans also planned to themselves return to Huliaipole in July 1918, in order to ignite an insurrection against the Ukrainian State. Upon their return, they became the nucleus for the Revolutionary Insurgent Army of Ukraine, which brought much of southern Ukraine under anarchist control throughout the Ukrainian War of Independence. Many members of the Union of Poor Peasants went over to the insurgent military, in order to defend Huliaipole against any prospective rulers. One of the group's members, Abram Budanov, founded a cultural organisation for the Insurgent Army and began the publication of anarchist propaganda.

In October 1918, the Union of Poor Peasants regrouped in Huliaipole and expanded their influence, establishing branches in Dibrivka and Pokrovske. By December, they had reopened an anarchist club in the town and published a series of leaflets agitating the peasantry to fight against the emergent White movement. The group also restarted the establishment of communes, eventually dropping propaganda work in favor of either organizational or military tasks.

When an alliance with the Bolsheviks was first proposed in January 1919, it was opposed by the Union of Poor Peasants, with one of their delegates to an anarchist congress in Yelyzavethrad displaying marked anti-Bolshevism. That same month, the Union was joined in Huliaipole by another anarchist organization: the Nabat. Relations between the two were initially cordial, as both had disagreed with the Makhnovist-Bolshevik alliance. But a dispute over the territory of the Makhnovshchina caused a split between them, as the Huliaipole anarchists insisted on controlling their home region, above all else. By the summer of 1919, definitive anarchist control of Huliaipole had again been lost, this time to the White movement. The Union of Poor Peasants then started to disappear from the historical record, as it was no longer able to effectively and openly work under occupation by the Armed Forces of South Russia.

== Membership ==
The Union of Poor Peasants was mostly made up of young people, with their age ranging from 15 to 25 years old, and was an ethnically diverse mix, reflecting the makeup of the local population. In the March 1910 trial, the members of the group that were implicated in the activities of the "illegal subversive association" included:

	Name	Ethnicity	Class	Sentence
1.	Nestor Makhno	Ukrainian	Peasant	Capital punishment (commuted to life imprisonment with penal labour)
2.	Anton Bondarenko	Ukrainian	Peasant	Unknown
3.	Yehor Bondarenko	Ukrainian	Peasant	Capital punishment
4.	Klym Kyrychenko	Ukrainian	Peasant	Capital punishment
5.	Pylyp Cherniavskyi	Ukrainian	Peasant	Unknown
6.	Pylyp Onyshchenko	Ukrainian	Peasant	Unknown
7.	Petro Onyshchenko	Ukrainian	Peasant	Unknown
8.	Ivan Shevchenko	Ukrainian	Peasant	Capital punishment (tried and executed before the others)
9.	Martynova	Ukrainian	Peasant	6 years of penal labour
10.	Zablodskyi	Ukrainian	Peasant	6 years of penal labour
11.	Yefim Orlov	Russian	Peasant	Capital punishment (commuted to life imprisonment with penal labour)
12.	Naum Althausen	Jewish	Town dweller	Capital punishment
13.	Leyba Gorelik	Jewish	Town dweller	Unknown
14.	Kazimierz Lisowski	Polish	Town dweller	6 years of penal labour

Other members included: the Ukrainian Levadny, who died of typhus in the infirmary according to official reports, although Makhno claimed he was strangled by another anarchist inmate; the Jewish Kshiva, who was executed on 17 June 1909 for murdering an agent provocateur; and the Ukrainian Nazarii Zuichenko, a police informant who allegedly contracted typhus before he could stand trial. Nestor’s brothers Savelii Makhno and Hryhorii Makhno were also members of the group.

== Ideology ==
The ideology of the Union of Poor Peasants was grounded in anarcho-communism. The group advocated for the establishment of a stateless society, based on the free association of communes, to be brought about through a social revolution. They considered expropriation and terrorism to be justifiable tactics in the struggle for libertarian communism.

Following the 1917 Revolution, under the influence of Nestor Makhno, the group began advocating for the establishment of free soviets and the overthrow of the Russian Provisional Government. Makhno argued that the largely structureless group needed to be reorganized along more tightly-coordinated lines, so it would be capable of achieving its anarchist goals. He declared that he was determined to jettison the group's old insurrectionary tendencies and isolated position, in favour of forging closer ties with the peasant masses and making preparations for an organized armed struggle.

== Legacy ==
Members that escaped capture continued their activities in Huliaipole, setting the groundwork for the libertarian resurgence during the 1917 Revolution. Following the February Revolution, Nestor Makhno was released from prison and returned to Huliaipole, where he was elected as Chairman of the local soviet and went on to lead the Revolutionary Insurgent Army of Ukraine (RIAU). By 1921, the RIAU was defeated by the Red Army and Makhno was forced into exile in France, where he died in 1934.

After decades of exile in South America, Voldemar Antoni eventually returned to Ukraine as a "soviet patriot", visiting Huliaipole for the 50-year anniversary of the October Revolution.

== See also ==
- Anarchism in Ukraine
- 1905 Russian Revolution
  - Bolshevik Military Organizations
  - Potemkin Mutiny
  - Russian Peasants' uprising of 1905–6
  - Sevastopol Uprising
  - SR Combat Organization

== Bibliography ==
- Darch, Colin (2020). Nestor Makhno and Rural Anarchism in Ukraine, 1917-1921. London: Pluto Press. ISBN 9781786805263. OCLC 1225942343.
- Malet, Michael (1982). Nestor Makhno in the Russian Civil War. London: Palgrave Macmillan. ISBN 978-0-333-25969-6. OCLC 8514426.
- Peters, Victor (1970). Nestor Makhno: The Life of an Anarchist. Winnipeg: Echo Books. OCLC 7925080.
- Skirda, Alexandre (2004) [1982]. Nestor Makhno–Anarchy's Cossack: The Struggle for Free Soviets in the Ukraine 1917–1921. Translated by Sharkey, Paul. Oakland: AK Press. ISBN 978-1-902593-68-5. OCLC 60602979.
