= Voldemar Antoni =

Ukrainian anarchist

- Вольдемар Антоні
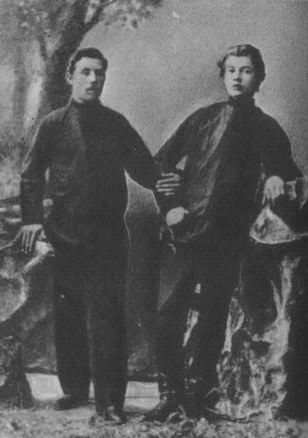
- Voldemar Antoni (left)
- Born: 4 May 1886; Huliaipole, Oleksandrivsky, Katerynoslav, Russian Empire
- Died: 15 May 1974 (aged 88); Nikopol, Dnipropetrovsk, Ukrainian SSR, Soviet Union
- Resting place: Nikopol cemetery
- Occupation: Lathe operator
- Organization: Union of Poor Peasants
- Parents: Heinrich Aloyzovich Anthony (father); Susana Yakovlevna Bonelis (mother)

Voldemar Henrikhovych Antoni (Ukrainian: Вольдемар Генріхович Антоні; 1886–1974) was a Ukrainian anarchist intellectual and the founder of the Union of Poor Peasants.

== Biography ==
Voldemar Antoni was born in Huliaipole, the son of Czech mechanic Henrik Aloisevich Antoni and German Susana Yakovlevna Bonelis. At the age of five, he began his education at the local public school, while living with his uncle, a saloon keeper. As he was quiet and short-sighted, Antoni came to be known by his classmates only as "the boy with the glasses".

In 1901, he finished school and left home, eventually returning to Huliaipole when he was eighteen years old and becoming a teacher in the local primary school. When he was reunited with his old schoolmates, he discussed his newfound anarchist political philosophy with them, drawing from what he had learnt while working with the anarchist group in Katerynoslav.

In the wake of the 1905 Revolution, Antoni established the Union of Poor Peasants, which developed connections with the Katerynoslav anarchist-communist group through Antoni. As the only member of the group that had a higher education, Antoni was in charge of producing the group's literature, securing a supply line of anarchist literature from Katerynoslav and Moscow, and organizing reading groups to spool through the works of Pierre-Joseph Proudhon, Max Stirner, Mikhail Bakunin and Peter Kropotkin. He also held a strong influence on Nestor Makhno, one of the group's younger members, "ridding his soul once and for all of the lingering remnants of the slightest spirit of servility and submission to any authority."

The group carried out a number of attacks throughout 1906 and 1907, during which they stole money and assassinated a number of local police officers. Antoni then used the stolen money to produce anarchist propaganda and to procure weapons and explosives from Vienna. A prisoner from Katerynoslav named Nazarii Zuichenko, claiming to be a confidant of the Huliaipole anarchists, informed the police that Voldemar Antoni had masterminded the attacks and provided the group with weapons. During a raid on an anarchist meeting, Antoni was arrested and subsequently held for a month in prison, after which he was released due to a lack of evidence against him. While the police gathered further evidence of the group's activities, Antoni managed to escape and fled into exile in Belgium, where he continued to act as the group's weapons supplier, leaving leadership of the group to Oleksandr Semenyuta.

Antoni eventually cut ties with the Huliaipole anarchists and emigrated to the United States. After decades of exile in the Americas, Antoni became a "soviet patriot" and emigrated to Kazakhstan with his family in the 1960s. In October 1967, he returned to Huliaipole for the celebration of the 50th Anniversary of the October Revolution, having lost any remaining shred of his former anarchist beliefs.

== Bibliography ==
- Darch, Colin (2020). Nestor Makhno and Rural Anarchism in Ukraine, 1917-1921. London: Pluto Press. ISBN 9781786805263. OCLC 1225942343.
- Malet, Michael (1982). Nestor Makhno in the Russian Civil War. London: Palgrave Macmillan. ISBN 978-0-333-25969-6. OCLC 8514426.
- Peters, Victor (1970). Nestor Makhno: The Life of an Anarchist. Winnipeg: Echo Books. OCLC 7925080.
- Skirda, Alexandre (2004) [1982]. Nestor Makhno–Anarchy's Cossack: The Struggle for Free Soviets in the Ukraine 1917–1921. Translated by Sharkey, Paul. Oakland: AK Press. ISBN 978-1-902593-68-5. OCLC 60602979.
