= Nazarii Zuichenko =

Ukrainian anarchist militant (1888–1938)

- Назарій Зуйченко
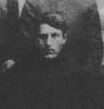
- Born: 1888; Huliaipole, Katerynoslav, Russian Empire
- Died: 25 April 1938 (aged 49–50); Dnipro, Ukrainian SSR, Soviet Union
- Cause of death: Execution by firing squad
- Occupation: Metallurgist
- Years active: 1907–1920
- Known for: Confession of role in the Union of Poor Peasants
- Movement: Anarchism

Nazarii Semenovych Zuichenko (Ukrainian: Назарій Семенович Зуйченко; 1888–1938) was a Ukrainian anarchist militant.

== Biography ==
In 1888, Nazarii Semenovych Zuichenko was born in the southern Ukrainian village of Huliaipole, where he worked as a copper metallurgist.

In the wake of the 1905 Revolution, Zuichenko joined the Union of Poor Peasants, a libertarian communist group established in Huliaipole by Voldemar Antoni. He met the young Nestor Makhno through the amateur theatre group they both performed in and brought him into the anarchist group, in which he became a prominent member.

Following a series of robberies committed by the group, during which he set fire to property of the Russian nobility, Zuichenko was tracked down in Katerynoslav and arrested by the police. In prison, he confessed to his participation in the group, identifying both Antoni and Voldemar as confidants. His testimony, which detailed their plot to assassinate the local police chief and move their activities to Katerynoslav, provided the prosecution with the evidence necessary to take the anarchists to trial. During their pre-trial hearing, while the other defendants retracted their own confessions, Zuichenko repeated his, leading to many of them being sentenced to capital punishment. But Zuichenko himself allegedly contracted typhus and was not able to stand trial.

Zuichenko survived until the 1917 Revolution, when he was reunited with Makhno and together ignited an insurrection against the Ukrainian authorities. Together with Halyna Kuzmenko and Hryhory Vasylivsky, Zuichenko was a founding member of the Commission for Anti-Makhnovist Activities in 1920.

On 25 April 1938, he was arrested on charges of belonging to a clandestine anarchist organization and executed, by order of the NKVD in the Dnipropetrovsk Oblast. He was posthumously rehabilitated on 31 January 1958.

== Bibliography ==
- Darch, Colin (2020). Nestor Makhno and Rural Anarchism in Ukraine, 1917-1921. London: Pluto Press. ISBN 9781786805263. OCLC 1225942343.
- Malet, Michael (1982). Nestor Makhno in the Russian Civil War. London: Palgrave Macmillan. ISBN 978-0-333-25969-6. OCLC 8514426.
- Skirda, Alexandre (2004) [1982]. Nestor Makhno–Anarchy's Cossack: The Struggle for Free Soviets in the Ukraine 1917–1921. Translated by Sharkey, Paul. Oakland: AK Press. ISBN 978-1-902593-68-5. OCLC 60602979.
