= Memory of Hryhorii Makhno =

Soldier (1919) Memory of Hryhorii Makhno (1919-1920) Communist Coal Miner (1920)
- Солдат (1919); Память Григория Махно (1919-1920); Коммунист-углекоп (1920)
- Active: 1919-1920
- Allegiance: South Russia (1919); Makhnovshchina (1919-1920); Ukrainian Soviet Socialist Republic (1920)
- Branch: Armed Forces of South Russia (1919); Revolutionary Insurgent Army of Ukraine (1919-1920); Red Army (1920)
- Type: Armored train
- Engagements: Ukrainian War of Independence

The Memory of Hryhorii Makhno was an armored train of the Revolutionary Insurgent Army of Ukraine, which consisted of two cars with 10 machine guns and two cannons.

== History ==
At the end of October 1919, the Makhnovists captured the armored train "Soldier" from the Armed Forces of South Russia and renamed it the "Memory of Hryhorii Makhno", after Nestor Makhno's brother Hryhorii Makhno, with Lontsov appointed as commander of the armored train. On the armored train, "Armored train in memory of the freedom fighter comrade Hryhorii Makhno" was written in red paint over the old inscription. Since at that moment the Makhnovists had once again declared themselves allies of the Soviets, reports of the seizure of the armored train, as a significant victory over the Denikinites near Bakhmach, appeared in the Bolshevik press: "... in the Bakhmach region, we captured the Denikin armor train from an English factory called Orm "(model name of locomotive)."

On 10 January 1920, seeing the approach of the Bolsheviks, Lontsov left Zaporozhye on his armored train and went to Nikopol. After the occupation of Nikopol, Lontsov fled from execution in Gulyaypole on 12 January. The armored train was captured by the soldiers of the 45th Rifle Division under the command of Iona Yakir, who renamed it the "Communist Coal Miner" (commanders - F. Bosyuk, then, from September to October 1920, A.P. Tsupov-Shapilsky). Phillip Bosyuk managed to repair the armored train, install three artillery pieces on it (instead of the ones damaged by the Makhnovists), one of which, however, had a damaged aiming mechanism. In addition, under his leadership, the railway track and bridges were restored to ensure the operation of the train. Bosyuk died in a shootout, having gone on reconnaissance on a boat along the Dnieper. Under the command of Alexander Petrovich Tsupov-Shapilsky, the armored train took part in battles with Wrangel's troops, first on the Nikopol-Apostolovo sector against the cavalry of Ivan Gavrilovich Barbovich until September 27, 1920, and on September 30 near Mirovoye station.
