= Pokrovske settlement hromada =

Pokrovske settlement hromada Покровська селищна громада
- Hromada
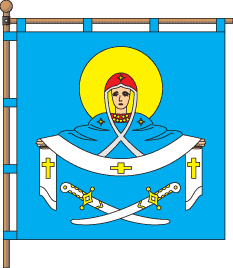
- Flag
- Interactive map of Pokrovske settlement hromada
- Country: Ukraine
- Oblast: Dnipropetrovsk Oblast
- Raion: Synelnykove Raion

Government
  - Head: Svitlana Spazheva

Area
  - Total: 696.98 km^{2} (269.11 sq mi)

Population (2022)
  - Total: 19,683
  - Density: 28.240/km^{2} (73.142/sq mi)
- Settlements: 46
- Rural settlements: 1
- Villages: 45
- Website: https://rebuildukraine.in.ua/en/pokrovsk-community2

Pokrovske settlement hromada in Ukraine has a population of 19,682 people as of 2022.

The Pokrovske settlement hromada was created on 18 July 2020 after the Pokrovske Raion dissolved and was united with the Synelnykove Raion.

== Settlements ==
=== Rural Settlements ===
- Pokrovske

=== Villages ===
- Andriivka
- Bohodarivka
- Bratske
- Verbove
- Vyshneve
- Vidradne
- Vilne
- Vovche
- Vodyane
- Hai
- Hapono-Mechetne
- Herasymivka
- Danylivka
- Dibrova
- Dobropasove
- Drozdi
- Yehorivka
- Zarichne
- Zelena Dolyna
- Zlahoda
- Katerynivka
- Kyrychkove
- Kolomiytsi
- Kryvobokove
- Levadne
- Malynivka
- Mayak
- Mechetne
- Nechayivka
- Novooleksandrivka
- Novoselyuvate
- Oleksandrivka
- Oleksiyivka
- Orly
- Ostapivske
- Otrishky
- Petriky
- Pysantsi
- Pishchane
- Pryvillya
- Radisne
- Romanky
- Skotuvate
- Solone
- Starokasyanivske
- Tykhe
