= Huliaipole urban hromada =

Hromada of Zaporizhzhia Oblast, Ukraine

Huliaipole urban hromada Гуляйпільська міська громада
- Hromada
- Interactive map of Huliaipole urban hromada
- Country: Ukraine
- Province: Zaporizhzhia Oblast
- District: Polohy Raion

Government
  - Head: Liudmyla Honchar

Population (2020)
  - Total: 19,564

Huliaipole urban territorial hromada (Ukrainian: Гуляйпільська міська територіальна громада, romanized: Huliaipilska miska terytorialna hromada) is a hromada of Ukraine, administratively located in Polohy Raion, Zaporizhzhia Oblast. Its administrative center is the city Huliaipole.

The area of the hromada is 676.75 square kilometers, and its population was 19,564 (as of 2020).

Liudmyla Honchar was elected head of the hromada in autumn 2020.

== Composition ==
The hromada contains the city and administrative center Huliaipole, the urban-type settlement of Zaliznychne, and 30 villages:

- Vesele
- Huliaipilske
- Dorozhnianka
- Zahirne
- Zatyshshia
- Zelene
- Zelenyi Hay
- Krasnohirske
- Marfopil
- Myrne
- Nove
- Novovasylivske
- Novohryhorivka
- Novoivanivka
- Novomykolaivka
- Novouspenivske
- Obratne
- Pavlivka
- Pryvilne
- Rybne
- Rivnopillia
- Svyatopetrivka
- Solodke
- Staroukrainka
- Stepanivka
- Temyrivka
- Uspenivka
- Charivne
- Chervone
- Yablunkove
