= Zaliznychne, Zaporizhzhia Oblast =

Rural locality in Zaporizhzhia Oblast, Ukraine

Zaliznychne Залізничне
- Rural settlement
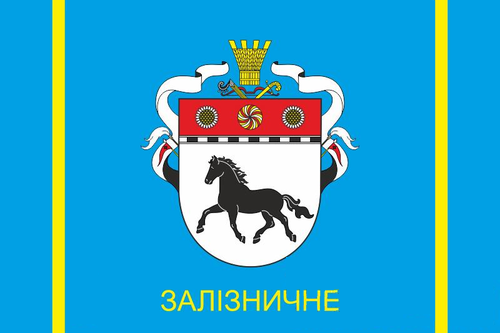
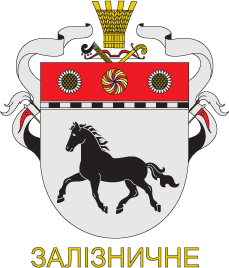
- Flag Coat of arms

- Location in Zaporizhzhia Oblast Location in Ukraine
- Country: Ukraine
- Oblast: Zaporizhzhia Oblast
- Raion: Polohy Raion
- Hromada: Huliaipole urban hromada

Population (2022)
  - Total: 1,052
- Time zone: UTC+2 (EET)
  - Summer (DST): UTC+3 (EEST)

Zaliznychne (Ukrainian: Залізничне, Russian: Зализничное) is a rural settlement in Polohy Raion of Zaporizhzhia Oblast in Ukraine. Zaliznychne belongs to Huliaipole urban hromada, one of the hromadas of Ukraine. Population: 1,052 (2022 estimate).

== History ==
The settlement was established in 1937 around Huliaipole train station that existed since 1898. In 1961 it was renamed as Zaliznychne, which roughly means "railway".

Until 18 July 2020, Zaliznychne belonged to Huliaipole Raion. The raion was abolished in July 2020 as part of the administrative reform of Ukraine, which reduced the number of raions of Zaporizhzhia Oblast to five. The area of Huliaipole Raion was merged into Polohy Raion.

As of April 2023, 38 residents remained in the village. Until 26 January 2024, Zaliznychne was designated urban-type settlement. On this day, a new law entered into force which abolished this status, and Zaliznychne became a rural settlement. By February 10, 2026, during the battles for Huliaipole as part of the Russian invasion of Ukraine, the village was occupied by the Armed Forces of the Russian Federation.
