= Temyrivka =

Rural locality in Zaporizhzhia Oblast, Ukraine

Temyrivka Темирівка
- Village
- Interactive map of Temyrivka
- Location of Temyrivka within Ukraine Temyrivka (Zaporizhzhia Oblast)
- Coordinates: 47°49′30″N 36°34′21″E
- Country: Ukraine
- Oblast: Zaporizhzhia Oblast
- Raion: Polohy Raion
- Hromada: Horlivka urban hromada
- Founded: 1825

Area
  - Total: 3.086 km^{2} (1.192 sq mi)
- Elevation: 154 m (505 ft)

Population (2001 census)
  - Total: 609
  - Estimate (2025): 1
  - Density: 197/km^{2} (511/sq mi)
- Time zone: UTC+2 (EET)
  - Summer (DST): UTC+3 (EEST)
- Postal code: 70210
- Area code: +380 6145
- KATOTTH: UA23100070280086482

Temyrivka (Ukrainian: Темирівка; Russian: Темировка) is a village in Huliaipole urban hromada, Polohy Raion, Zaporizhzhia Oblast, Ukraine.

== Geography ==
The absolute height is 154 metres above sea level.

== History ==
The village was founded in between 1823 and 1825 by settlers from the Voronezh Governorate.

=== Russian invasion of Ukraine ===
The village was captured by Russian forces in early August 2025, during the full-scale Russian invasion of Ukraine.

== Demographics ==
As of the 2001 Ukrainian census, the settlement had 609 inhabitants, whose native languages were 90.45% Ukrainian, 8.90% Russian, 0.32% "Moldovan" (Romanian) and 0.16% Gagauz.
