= Solodke, Polohy Raion, Zaporizhzhia Oblast =

Solodke Солодке
- Village
- Location of Solodke in Zaporizhzhia Oblast Solodke (Ukraine)
- Coordinates: 47°47′09″N 36°19′13″E
- Country: Ukraine
- Oblast: Zaporizhzhia Oblast
- District: Polohy Raion
- Hromada: Huliaipole urban hromada
- Founded: 1932

Area
  - Total: 1.265 km^{2} (0.488 sq mi)
- Elevation: 133 m (436 ft)

Population (2001)
  - Total: 139
  - Density: 110/km^{2} (285/sq mi)
- Time zone: UTC+2 (EET)
  - Summer (DST): UTC+3 (EEST)
- Postal code: 70214
- Area code: +380 6145
- Climate: Dfa

Solodke (Ukrainian: Солодке) is a village (a selo) in the Polohy Raion (district) of Zaporizhzhia Oblast in southern Ukraine. It is part of Huliaipole urban hromada, one of the hromadas of Ukraine.

Until 18 July 2020, Solodke belonged to Huliaipole Raion. The raion was abolished in July 2020 as part of the administrative reform of Ukraine, which reduced the number of raions of Zaporizhzhia Oblast to five. The area of Huliaipole Raion was merged into Polohy Raion. On 11 November 2025, the village was captured by Russian forces.

== Demographics ==
Native language as of the Ukrainian Census of 2001:

Language	Percentage
Ukrainian	92.09 %
Armenian	6.47 %
Russian	1.44 %
