= Oleksandr Semenyuta =

Ukrainian anarchist

- Олександр Семенюта
- Born: 1883; Huliaipole, Oleksandrivsky, Katerynoslav, Russian Empire
- Died: 1 May 1910 (aged 26–27); Huliaipole, Oleksandrivsky, Katerynoslav, Russian Empire
- Cause of death: Suicide
- Resting place: Huliaipole cemetery
- Years active: 1902–1910
- Organization: Union of Poor Peasants
- Known for: Arms trafficking Assassination; Robbery
- Movement: Expropriative anarchism
- Opponent: Russian Empire
- Spouse: Martha Pivel
- Motive: Anarcho-communism
- Reward amount: 2,000 rubles
- Capture status: Killed in action
- Wanted by: Okhrana
- Accomplice: Nestor Makhno
- Wanted since: 10 August 1908
- Time at large: 1 year, 8 months and 21 days

Oleksandr Kostyantynovich Semenyuta (Ukrainian: Олександр Костянтинович Семенюта; 1883–1910) was a Ukrainian insurrectionary anarchist and leader of the Union of Poor Peasants.

== Biography ==
Oleksandr Kostyantynovich Semenyuta was born in 1883, to a family of former serfs, in the small Ukrainian village of Huliaipole. He only received a primary education.

In the wake of the 1905 Revolution, Oleksandr Semenyuta joined the Union of Poor Peasants, helping to maintain close relations between it and the anarchist-communist group in Katerynoslav. Soon after he was conscripted into the military, but evaded the draft by going into hiding. He eventually returned to Huliaipole clandestinely in order to visit his family, while sometimes also smuggling anarchist literature and small arms into the village. With these weapons, Semenyuta advised the group to begin carrying out "expropriations", spurring them on to carry out a number of raids, during which they stole money and assassinated local police officers.

In August 1908, Semenyuta again returned to Huliaipole from Katerynoslav for a group meeting at Ivan Levadny's house. The police found out about the meeting through their informants and surrounded the house, leading to a shoot-out, during which Prokip Semenyuta was hit in the leg. Oleksandr attempted to rescue his brother, but Prokip himself insisted he be put down so that Oleksandr could escape, with Prokip shooting himself to avoid capture. Following this showdown with the police, the group's leader Voldemar Antoni subsequently fled to Belgium, leaving leadership of the group to Oleksandr Semenyuta, who moved their centre of activity to the city of Katerynoslav and began planning their next moves.

Seeking revenge for his brother, Oleksandr plotted a number of attacks against the local Okhrana, but these were all aborted before they could be carried out. Many members of the anarchist group were subsequently arrested, but Semenyuta himself managed to escape and fled to Belgium. While his comrades were imprisoned in Oleksandrivsk, Semenyuta sent a letter to the Huliaipole police chief Kariachentsev:

"To Huliaipole, to Kariachentsev, poxy devil: Mr. Superintendent, I have heard it said that you have been searching for me high and low and dearly wish to meet with me. If this be the case, I then beseech you to come to Belgium. Here, freedom of speech is unrestricted, and we will be able to chat at leisure. Signed: Oleksandr Semenyuta, Huliaipole anarchist."

Despite his invitation for Kariachentsev to come to Belgium, Semenyuta himself was planning to return to Ukraine, in order to break his comrades out of prison. One night in the autumn of 1909, Kariachentsev attended a play at a local theatre, not knowing that Semenyuta had returned from Belgium and was sitting a few rows behind him. Upon leaving the theatre, Semenyuta shot Kariachentsev three times, killing the police chief and escaping into the night.

On 5 January 1910, Semenyuta's imprisoned comrades were being transferred from Oleksandrivsk to Katerynoslav. Disguised in a sheepskin cloak and a papakha, Semenyuta planted himself at the train station in Oleksandrivsk, while other conspirators waited nearby with sleighs. When the train was delayed due to a blizzard, Semenyuta stepped into the station's waiting room, where he was recognized by a police informant and forced to flee the scene, aborting the planned prison break. The police subsequently put a bounty on his head and declared him public enemy number one, but he was able to elude capture for several months.

On 1 May 1910, he returned to Huliaipole with his companion Martha Pivel and decided to stay at his own mother's house. His presence was swiftly reported to the police by an informant called Piotr Sharovsky, who received only 500 rubles of the 2,000 ruble bounty for the information. The police then surrounded the house and stormed it, discovering that Semenyuta had shot himself during the siege, while Pivel herself had been wounded in the crossfire.

When the February Revolution broke out, an anarchist procession brought black flags to the graves of Oleksandr and Prokip Semenyuta. Oleksandr's portrait was also hung alongside those of Mikhail Bakunin and Peter Kropotkin, in the headquarters of the Huliaipole libertarian communist group. Following the October Revolution, Semenyuta's former comrade Nestor Makhno worked on a revolutionary tribunal, in which he prosecuted the informants that had been responsible for Semenyuta's death. Semenyuta's old house was later used as a meeting place for the nucleus of the Revolutionary Insurgent Army of Ukraine, which included his last surviving brother Andrei.

== Bibliography ==
- Darch, Colin (2020). Nestor Makhno and Rural Anarchism in Ukraine, 1917-1921. London: Pluto Press. ISBN 9781786805263. OCLC 1225942343.
- Malet, Michael (1982). Nestor Makhno in the Russian Civil War. London: Palgrave Macmillan. ISBN 978-0-333-25969-6. OCLC 8514426.
- Peters, Victor (1970). Nestor Makhno: The Life of an Anarchist. Winnipeg: Echo Books. OCLC 7925080.
- Skirda, Alexandre (2004) [1982]. Nestor Makhno–Anarchy's Cossack: The Struggle for Free Soviets in the Ukraine 1917–1921. Translated by Sharkey, Paul. Oakland: AK Press. ISBN 978-1-902593-68-5. OCLC 60602979.
