= Pokrovske, Synelnykove Raion, Dnipropetrovsk Oblast =

Rural locality in Dnipropetrovsk Oblast, Ukraine

Pokrovske Покровське
- Rural settlement
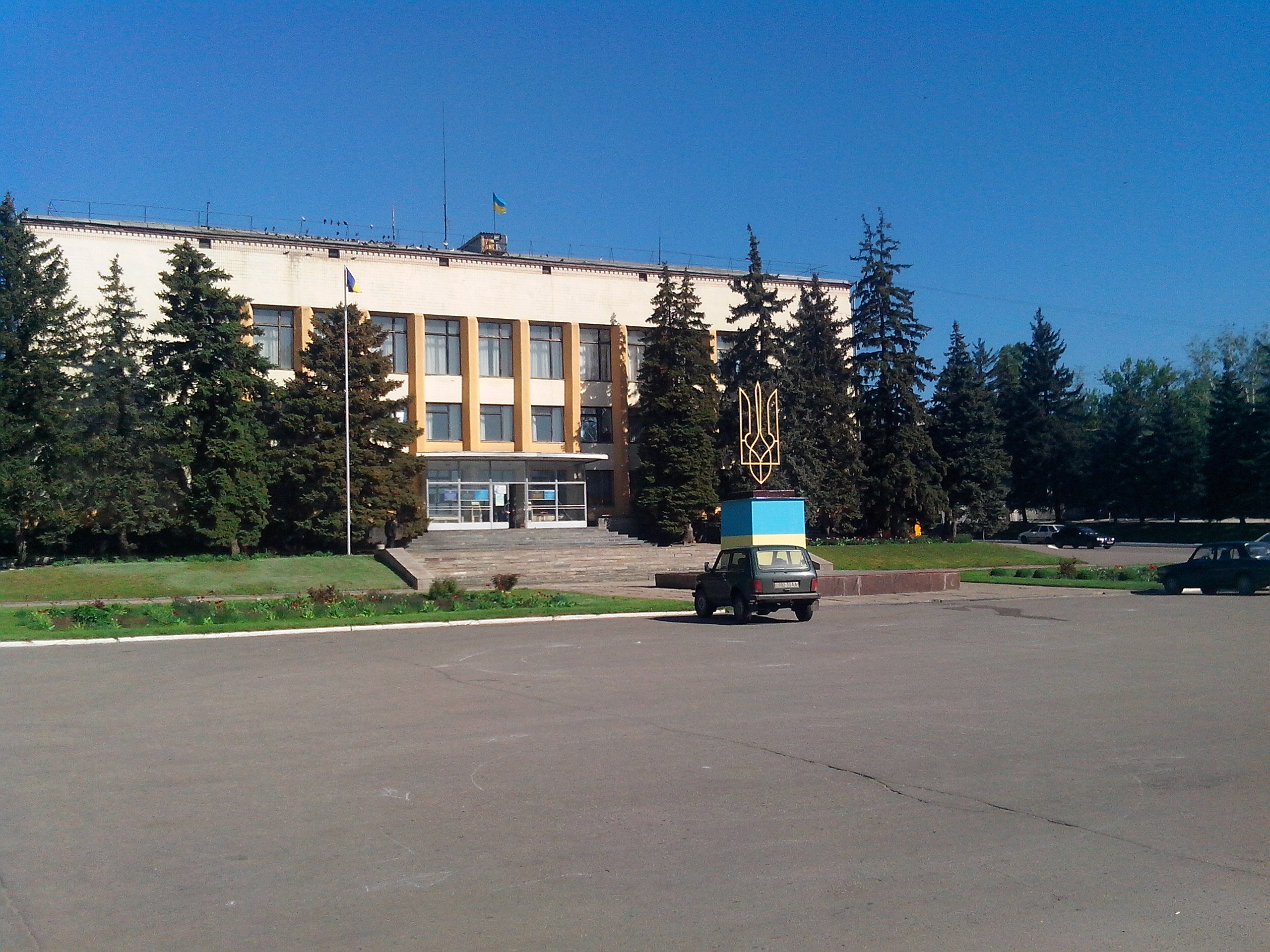
- Pokrovske District State Administration

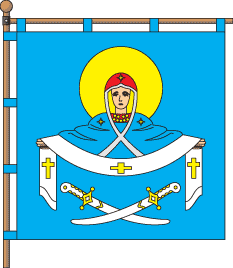
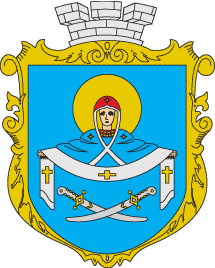
- Flag Seal
- Interactive map of Pokrovske
- Location within Dnipropetrovsk Oblast Location within Ukraine
- Coordinates: 47°58′57″N 36°14′02″E
- Country: Ukraine
- Oblast: Dnipropetrovsk Oblast
- Raion: Synelnykove Raion
- Hromada: Pokrovske settlement hromada
- Founded: 1779 (247 years ago)
- Urban-type settlement Status: 1957

Area
  - Total: 9 km^{2} (3.5 sq mi)
- Elevation: 110 m (360 ft)

Population (2022)
  - Total: 9,489
- Time zone: UTC+2 (EET)
  - Summer (DST): UTC+3 (EEST)
- Postal code: 53600
- Area code: +380 5638

Pokrovske (Ukrainian: Покро́вське) is a rural settlement in Dnipropetrovsk Oblast, east-central Ukraine. It hosts the administration of Pokrovske settlement hromada, one of the hromadas of Ukraine. The settlement has population around 9,489 (2022 estimate).

== Geography ==
The village of Pokrovske is located on the right bank of the Vovcha River (a tributary of the Seversky Donets). Two kilometers upstream is the village of Yagodnoye. Two and a half kilometers downstream is Chernenkovo. On the opposite bank are Bogodarovka, Aleksandrovka, and Chervony Liman. One kilometer away is Levadnoye. A drying stream with a dam flows through the village.

== History ==
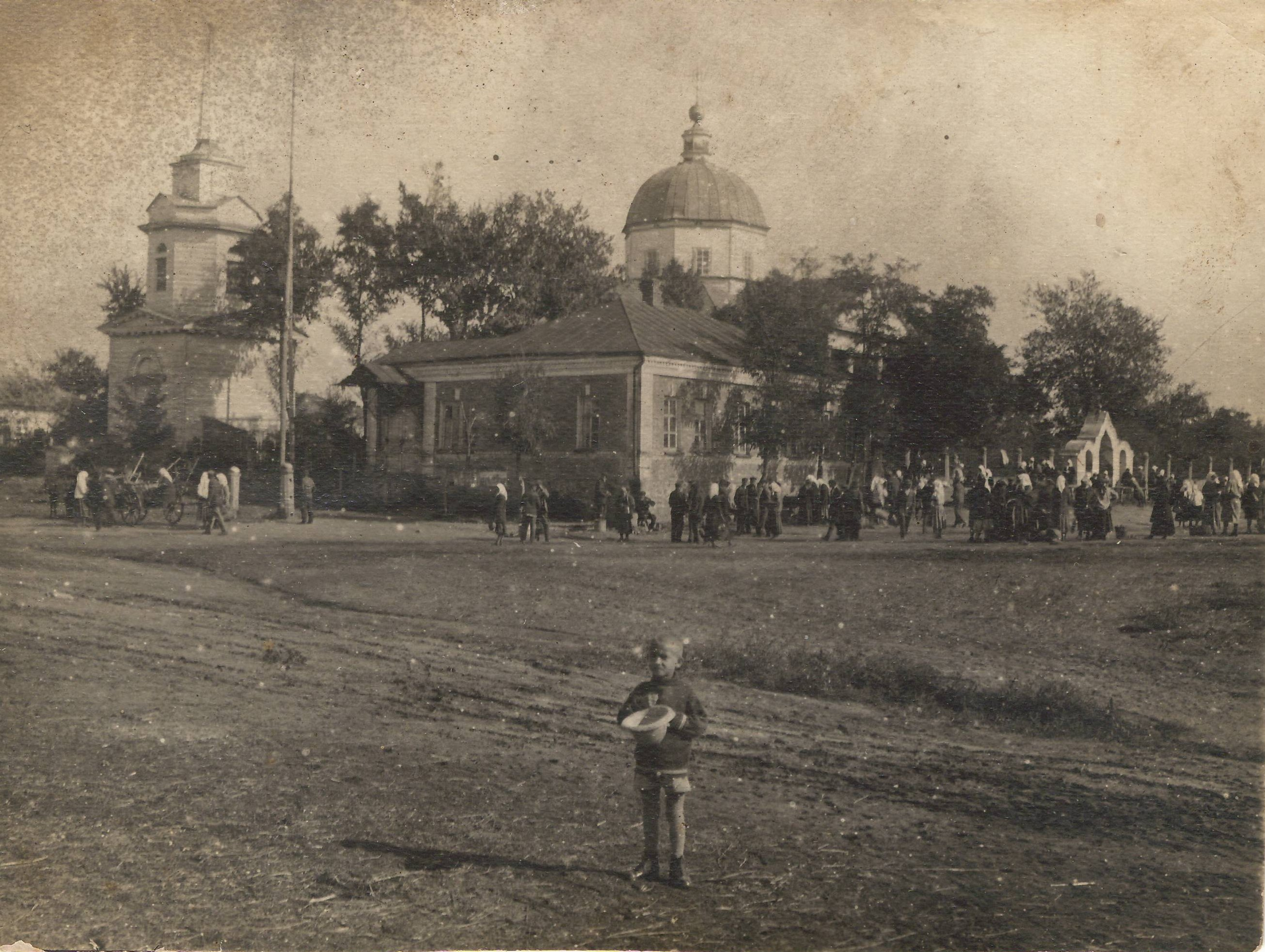
Parochial school in Pokrovske. Early 1930s.

The settlement was founded as a village in the Aleksandrovsky Uyezd of the Yekaterinoslav Governorate and first mentioned in historical documents in 1779. At the end of the 19th century, a school, an almshouse, several bazaars and shops operated here, and fairs were held regularly.

At the beginning of the 20th century, manganese deposits were discovered in Pokrovske. In October 1930, a MTS was established here.

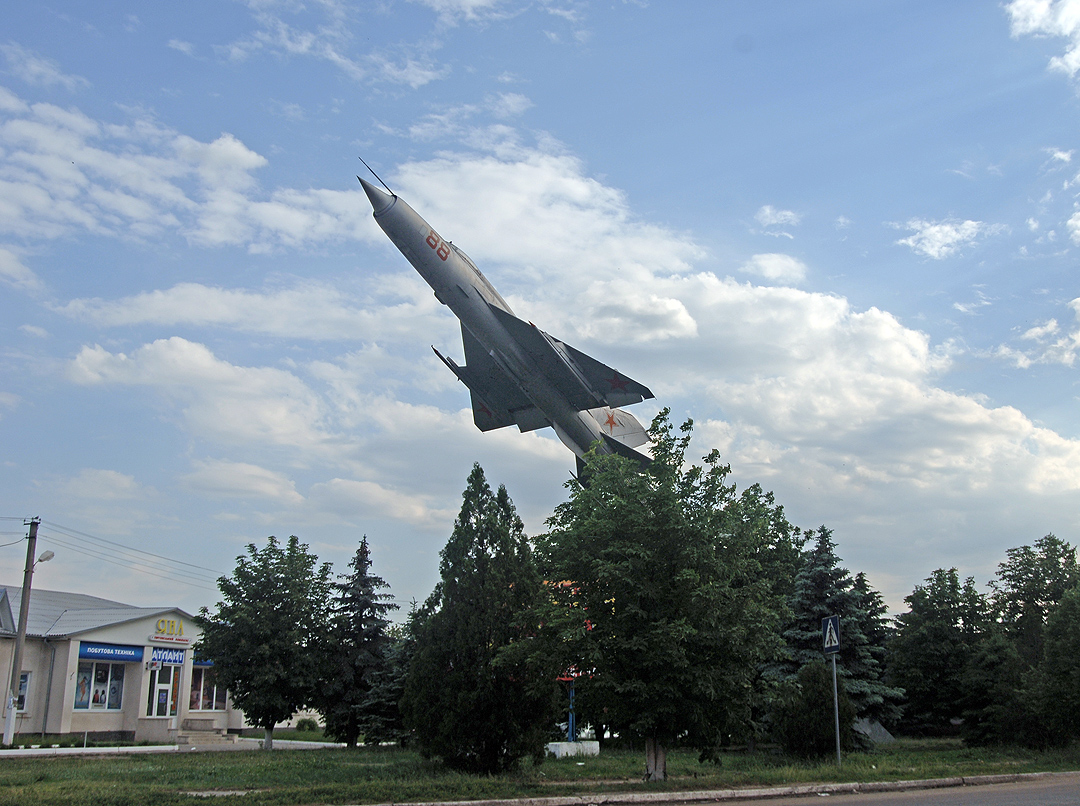
Soviet airplane MIG-21 monument.

During the Second World War, in October 1941, the village was occupied by advancing German troops, but on September 14, 1943, it was liberated by units of the 257th Rifle Division of the Red Army. In 1957, it was granted the status of "urban-type settlement".

In January 1989 the population was 12,080 inhabitants. On 25 August 2014, a monument to Lenin was toppled in town. Until the raion was abolished on 18 July 2020, Pokrovske was the administrative center of Pokrovske Raion. After that date the urban-type settlement became part of Synelnykove Raion.

Until 26 January 2024, Pokrovske was designated urban-type settlement. On this day, a new law entered into force which abolished this status, and Pokrovske became a rural settlement.

=== Battle for the village (2025–present) ===
In September 2025, as part of the Huliaipole offensive, the Armed Forces of the Russian Federation, entered the southeastern outskirts of the Dnipropetrovsk Oblast, began an attack on the village.

== Demographics ==
As of the 2001 Ukrainian census, the town had 11,661 inhabitants. In December 2025, the village had 200 inhabitants. The linguistic composition was as follows:

Native languages in Pokrovske
	percent
Ukrainian	94.22%
Russian	4.94%
Armenian	0.39%
Belarusian	0.13%
others	0.32%

== Culture ==
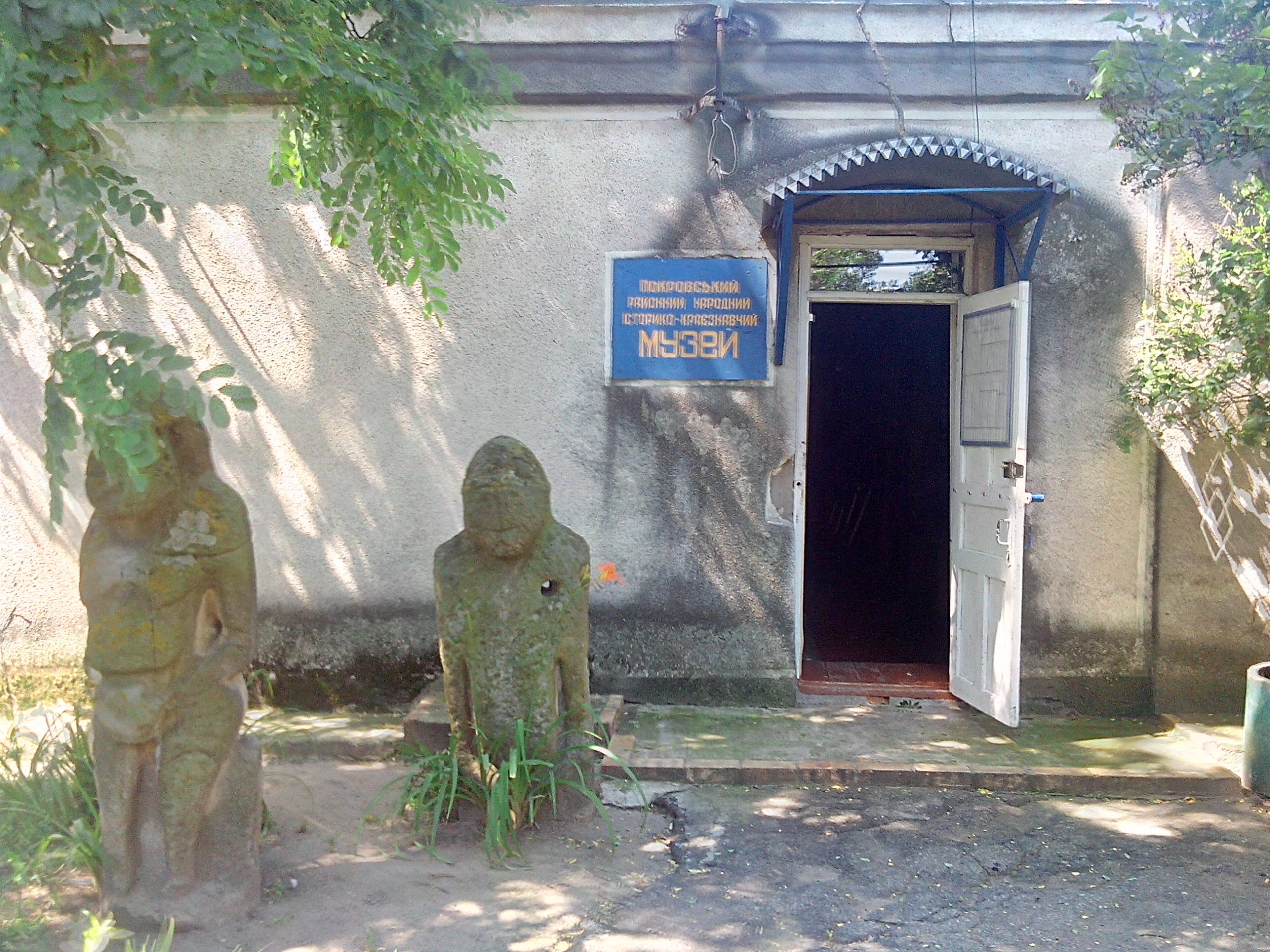
Museum in Pokrovske.

The Pokrovsky District People's History and Local Lore Museum was founded on November 22, 1969, and awarded the title of People's Museum in June 1971. It is housed in a separate building with an area of 315 square meters. The museum houses documentary, photographic, and material sources on the history and ethnography of the district, comprising a total of 3,300 museum items.

== Social services ==
=== Transport ===
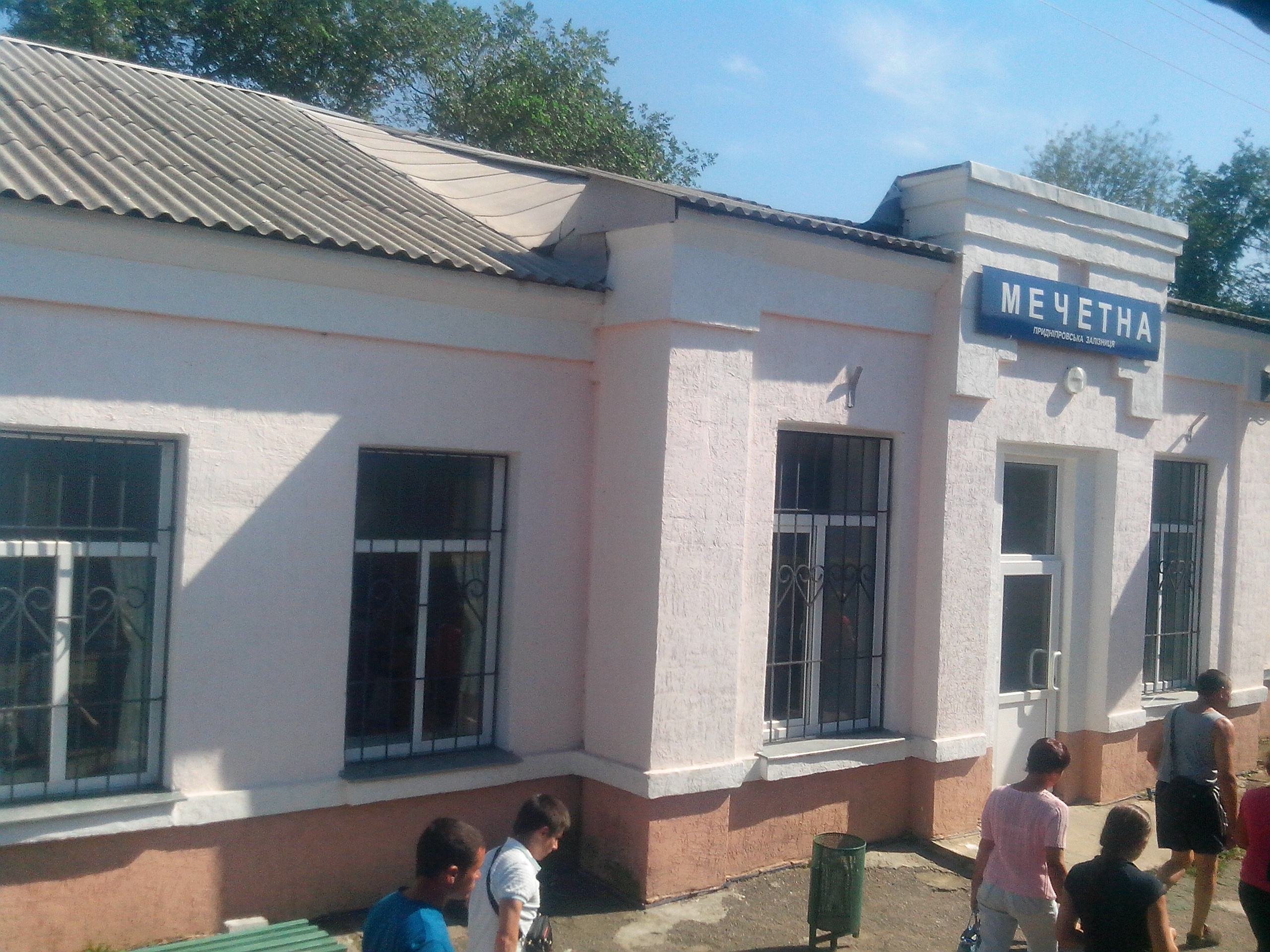
Pokrovske-Machetna railway station.

The village has a bus station that connects the district center not only with other settlements of Pokrovsky district, but also with cities such as Dnipro, Zaporizhzhia, Mariupol. The following roads pass through the village: Н-15, Т-0401 and the railway station Mechetna. The Chaplyne —Berdyansk railway branch passes through the territory of Pokrovsky. Within the village there is a Mechetna station of the Prydniprovska railway, at which the suburban train Chaplyne —Polohy stops.

=== Schools ===
- School No. 1
- School No. 2
- School No. 1 for grades I-II
- School No. 2 for grades I-II
- 4 kindergartens
- Hospital
- Central Community Center
- Community Center No. 1
- Community Center No. 2

=== Economy ===
- LLC "Vidrodzhennya"
- LLC "Rodina"
- Elevator LLC "AF Kontraktovaya"
