= Huliaipole =

City in Zaporizhzhia Oblast, Ukraine

Huliaipole Гуляйполе
- City
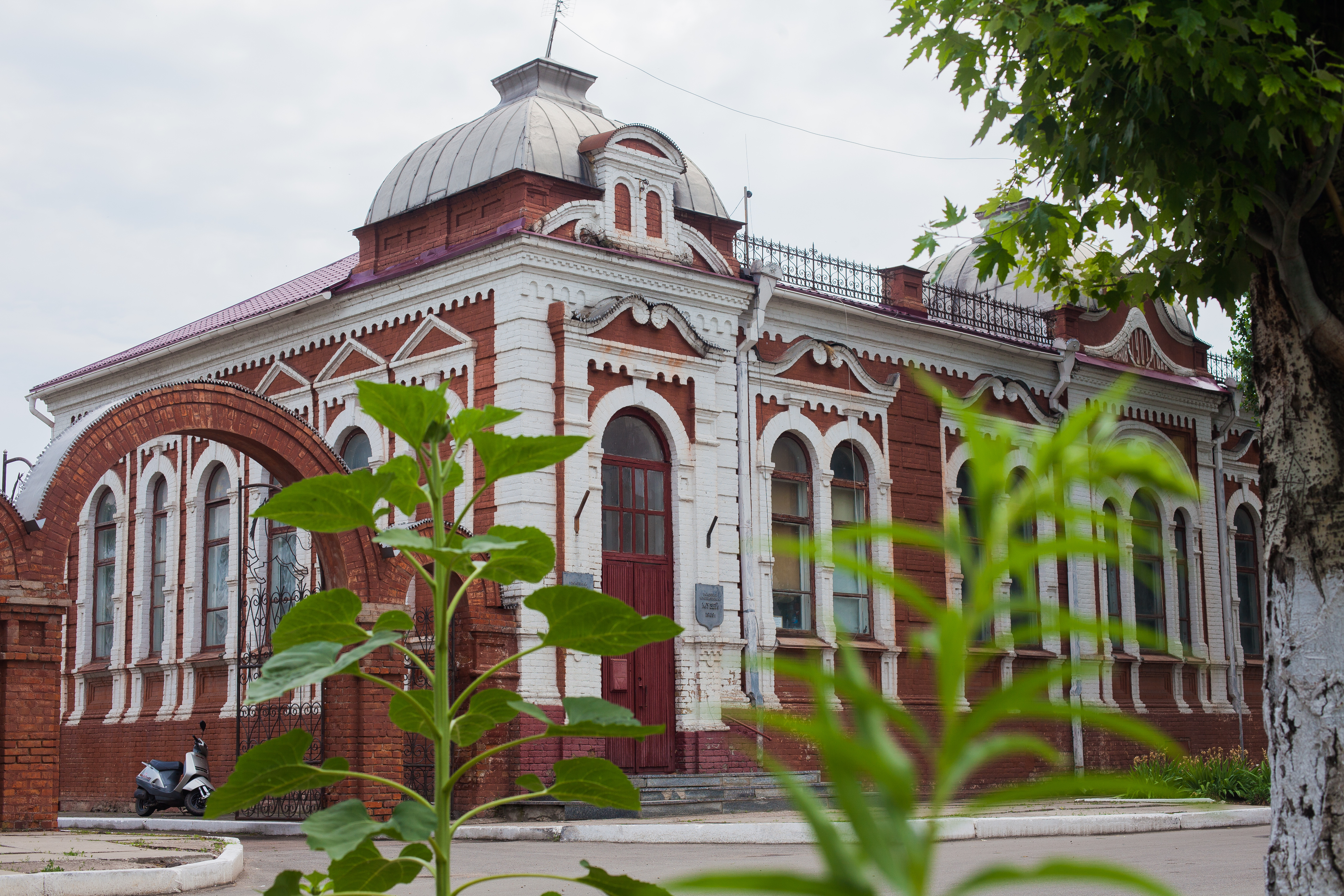
- Museum of Local Lore

- Coat of arms
- Etymology: "Walk-about field"
- Nickname: Makhnograd
- Interactive map of Huliaipole
- Huliaipole Huliaipole (Ukraine)
- Coordinates: 47°39′N 36°16′E
- Country: Ukraine
- Oblast: Zaporizhzhia Oblast
- Raion: Polohy Raion
- Hromada: Huliaipole urban hromada
- Established: 1785; 241 years ago
- City status: 1938; 88 years ago

Government
  - Body: Huliaipole City Council
  - Mayor: Serhiy Oleksandrovych Yarmak

Area
  - Total: 23.1 km^{2} (8.9 sq mi)
- Elevation: 109 m (358 ft)

Population (2024)
  - Total: 2,000
  - Density: 87/km^{2} (220/sq mi)
- Postal code: 70200
- Area code: +380 6145
- Climate: Dfa
- Website: gpmrada.gov.ua

Huliaipole (Ukrainian: Гуляйполе [ɦʊlʲɐjˈpɔle]; lit. 'walk-about field') is a small city in Polohy Raion, Zaporizhzhia Oblast, Ukraine. It is known as the birthplace of anarchist revolutionary Nestor Makhno. In January 2022, it had an estimated population of 12,786, making it the 9th most populous city in Zaporizhzhia at the time.

During the Russian invasion of Ukraine, Huliaipole was attacked, placing it on one of the lines of contact separating Ukrainian and Russian forces. In late 2025, it was contested after a Russian offensive towards the city. In November 2025, it was estimated that there were less than 500 people remaining in the city. By 28 December 2025, the Russian Ministry of Defense and other sources reported that their forces had gained complete control over Huliaipole. At the time, the Ukrainian General Staff denied the claims of Russian control. Later, the Institute for the Study of War (ISW), in its 6 February 2026 offensive report, confirmed that Russian forces had captured the city.

== History ==
Prior to the annexation of the Crimean Khanate by the Russian Empire, the area was mostly settled by the Zaporozhian Cossacks and the nomadic Lesser Nogai Horde. The settlement arose during the 1770s, after the construction of the Dnieper defensive line on the former lands of the Zaporozhian Sich, as part of the Russian Empire's policy to populate and develop the conquered Zaporozhian lands. When Catherine the Great dissolved the Sich, the local Cossacks either fled into exile or were brought into serfdom, with the residents of what is now Huliaipole falling under the yoke of the Shabelskiys.

In 1785, the board of the Yekaterinoslav Governorate ordered the Novomoskovsk Zemstvo Court to establish the Huliaipole state military settlement for protection from the Crimean Khanate. Archival data confirmed that the first settlers came to the newly formed settlement from the territory of Starodubsky District, and later Kyiv region, Chernihiv region, Poltava region and Sloboda Ukraine. The name "Huliaipole" (lit. 'walk-about field') reflected the nature of the area where it was founded, which had frequently played host to fairs for a long time before the settlement's foundation. The settlement was traditionally divided into centuries, administrative-territorial units formed along military lines. Hundreds of people from Podolia, Pishchanka, Guryan, Verbiv, Bokhansky, Kherson and later Poland settled in this way. In 1794 the settlement had 150 yards. The inhabitants of the region were actively engaged in agriculture and animal husbandry.

In 1797 the wooden Orthodox Church "Exaltation of the Honest and Life-Giving Christ" was built, and Huliaipole became the township center of Alexandrovsky Uyezd.

=== Industrialization ===
From the middle of the 19th to the beginning of the 20th century, the village of Huliaipole was transformed into a commercial and industrial town. In 1859, the first trades fair took place in Huliaipole. There were more than fifty trading companies with a total turnover of 1 million rubles. Next to them there were a large number of shops. The increased trade contributed to a large influx of population.

In the post-reform period, industrial enterprises emerged one after another in Huliaipole. In 1882, Krieger's factory of agricultural machinery began operating. Ten years later, another such plant and steam mill was opened by the industrialist Kerner. Both factories produced harvesters, horse threshers, choppers, and so on. The landowner Schroeder also had a large steam mill. In the following years, distilleries, several oil mills, and warehouses were put into operation. There were 18 shops in the village, and about three dozen merchants traded. In 1898, the Chaplyne–Berdyansk railway was laid nearby, which had a positive effect on the economic development of the village.

There were two agricultural machinery factories, four distilleries and one brewery in Huliaipole. There were three steam mills in Huliaipole and dozens more in the surrounding villages and economies that were part of Huliaipole parish. Besides them, there were a large number of peasant "windmills" around. In addition, there were two brick and tile factories in Huliaipole and twelve in villages and hamlets.

Along with industrial enterprises, in the village there were a dozen small, semi-artisanal productions - a crew workshop, several potters, as well as oil mills, smithies, carpentry and other workshops.

From 1884 until the First World War, Zemstvo exhibitions and auctions of agricultural and industrial products took place in Huliaipole every three years.

=== Conflict ===
Location of the Makhnovshchina in present-day Ukraine.

After World War I, new socio-economic transformations took place in Huliaipole, caused by the change of state power and political regime. Between 1917 and 1921, reflective of the turbulence in the region brought about by the Russian Civil War (and concurrent Ukrainian War of Independence), the town changed hands no fewer than sixteen times. During this period, Huliaipole was variously held by Austro-Hungarian forces, the Red Army, the Ukrainian People's Republic, the Hetmanate, Anton Denikin's White Army and the Nestor Makhno's Insurgent Army, among others. During the conflict, Huliaipole became widely known as the headquarters of the Revolutionary Insurgent Army of Ukraine and the capital of the Makhnovshchina. Afterwards it was administratively part of the Zaporizhzhia Governorate of Ukraine.

During the industrialization of the 1930s, a rapid industrial development began to take place in Huliaipole, resulting in it gaining city status in 1938. Meanwhile, at least 108 residents of Huliaipole died during the Holodomor of 1932–1933.

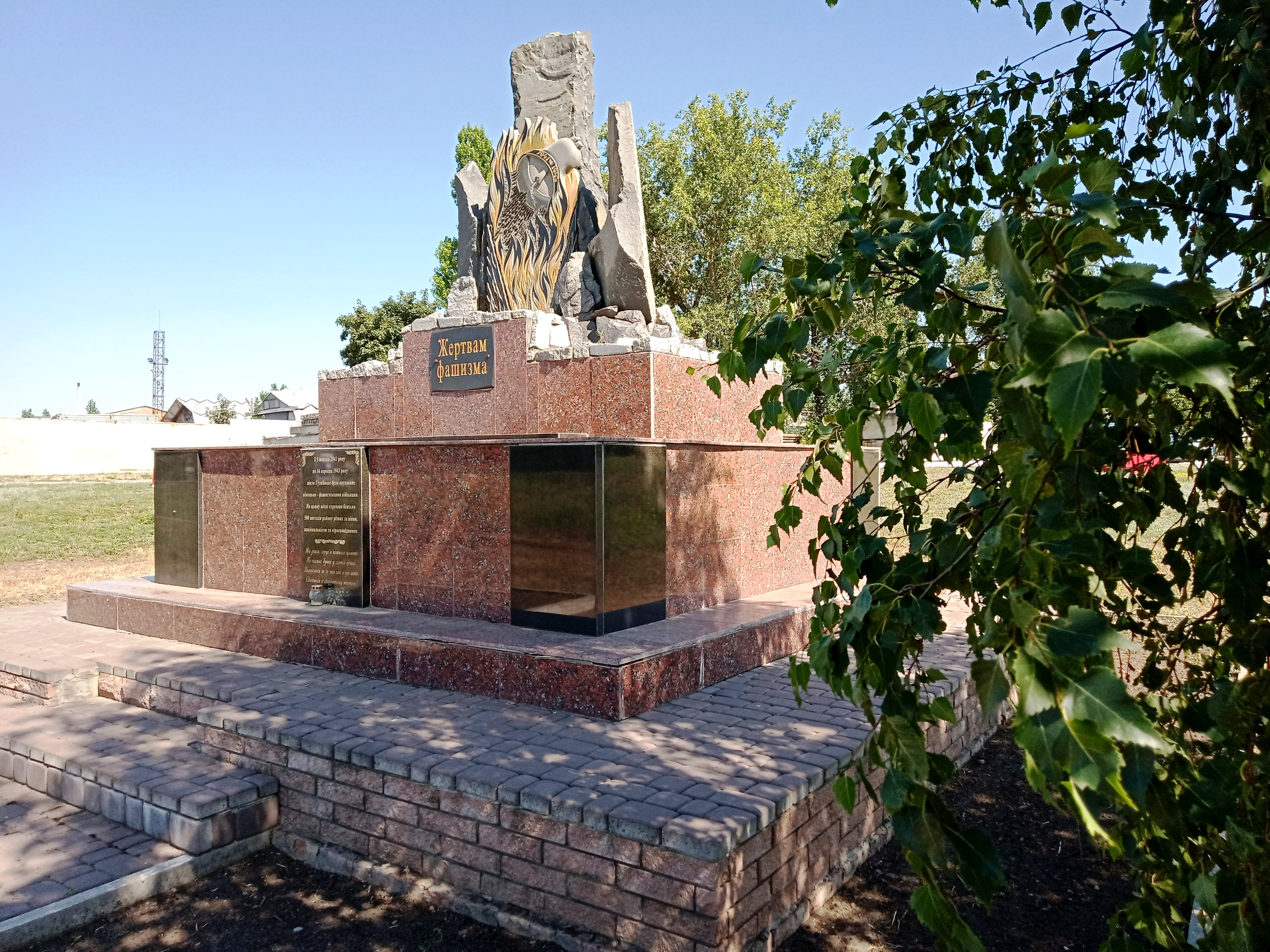
Mass grave of 500 victims of Nazi Germany

On 5 October 1941, as a result of the German offensive, Soviet troops fled the city and it was occupied by the Wehrmacht. On 16 September 1943, it was liberated by the Soviet troops of the Southern Front during the Donbas strategic offensive.

=== Post World War 2 era ===
In 1952, a brick factory, a butter factory, a garment and footwear factory, a pedagogical school, a secondary school, four seven-year schools, six elementary schools, a cinema and a club functioned here. In 1970, there was an agricultural machinery plant, a paint and varnish plant, an auto repair plant, a household goods plant, a cheese-making plant and a shoe factory.

By the time of the Declaration of Independence of Ukraine, the basis of the city's economy was an agricultural machinery plant, a paints and varnishes plant, a shoe factory and food industry enterprises. In May 1995, the Government of Ukraine approved the decision on the privatization of the agricultural machinery plant, the paints and varnishes plant, regional agricultural and chemistry plants. In July 1995, a decision was approved on the privatization of the state farm. On 17 December 2004, the economic court of the Zaporizhzhia Oblast filed a bankruptcy case against a privatized agricultural machinery plant. On 17 July 2020, as a result of administrative-territorial reform and liquidation of Huliaipole Raion, the city became a part of Polohy Raion.

=== Russo-Ukrainian War ===
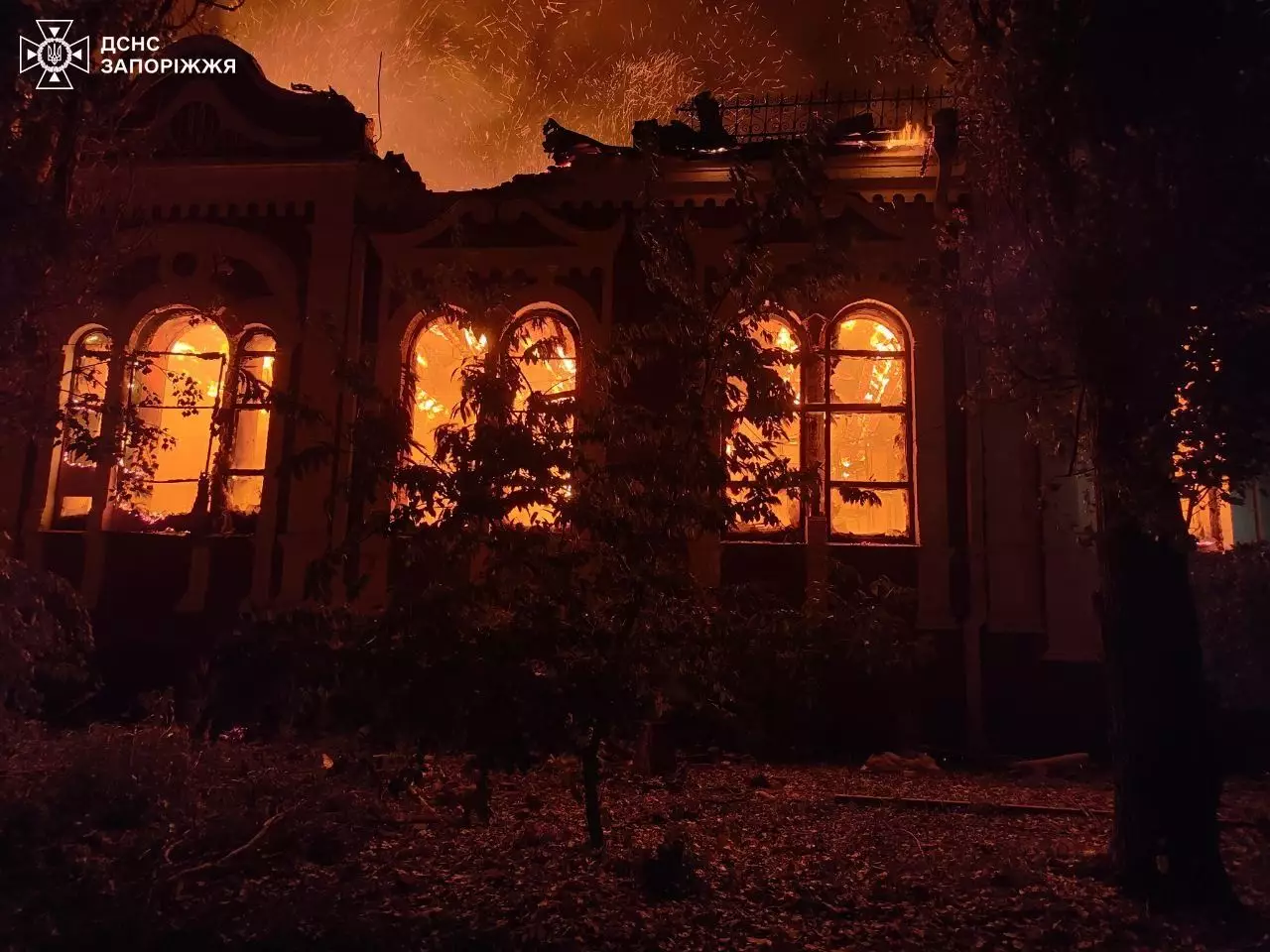
Building of Huliaipole Local Museum after Russian shelling on 24 August 2024

Since 2022, Huliaipole has been severely affected by the Russo-Ukrainian war. Under constant bombardment by Russian forces, many of Huliaipole's residents have been evacuated by the local administration, while a number of residential buildings and civilian infrastructure has been damaged or destroyed.

On 25 December 2025, Russian forces captured the headquarters of a Ukrainian Armed Forces battalion in the center of Huliaipole, as well as equipment and documentation. On 27 December 2025, Russian forces claimed capture of the city. The Ukrainian side denied this. The Institute for the Study of War found evidence that Russian troops controlled 55% of the town. According to Euromaidan Press, the city had fallen into Russian hands. On 6 February, ISW reported that Russian forces captured Huliaipole.

== Geography ==
The town of Huliaipole is located in the Haichul river valley (the name of the reservoir is etymologized from the Turkic languages: gai "free" + chur "steppe"), upstream at a distance of 3.5 km is the village of Marfopil, downstream at a distance of 1.5 km is the village of Zelene. It is located 8 km from the railway station of the same name and 98 km from the regional center of Zaporizhzhia (via highways H08 and T 0814). In the north, Polohy Raion borders with Synelnykove Raion of the Dnipropetrovsk Oblast, in the east – with Donetsk.

== Demographics ==
Ethnic and linguistic composition according to the 2001 Ukrainian census:

Ethnic groups in Huliaipole
	percent
Ukrainians	93.71%
Russians	5.45%
Belarusians	0.23%
Armenians	0.15%
Tatars	0.05%

Languages in Huliaipole
Languages	percent
Ukrainian	94.5%
Russian	5.2%
others	0.2%

Population of Huliaipole
Year	1810	1859	1900	1913	1917	1926	1970	1989	2013	2021	2024
Population	1,852	2,521	10,000	16,150	25,000	12,027	16,000	19,198	14,358	13,070	~2,000

== Notable people ==
- Voldemar Antoni (1886–1974), Ukrainian anarchist intellectual, founder of the Union of Poor Peasants
- Vilen Kalyuta (1930–1999), Ukrainian cinematographer
- Semen Karetnyk (1893–1920), Ukrainian anarchist, commander of the Revolutionary Insurgent Army of Ukraine
- Nestor Makhno (1888–1934), Ukrainian anarchist, commander-in-chief of the Revolutionary Insurgent Army of Ukraine
- Oleksiy Marchenko (1880s–1921), Ukrainian anarchist, commander of the Revolutionary Insurgent Army of Ukraine
- Oleksandr Semenyuta (1883–1910), Ukrainian insurrectionary anarchist, leader of the Union of Poor Peasants

== Twin towns – sister cities ==
Huliaipole is twinned with:

- Chernivtsi, Ukraine (2025)
- Horishni Plavni, Ukraine (2025)
- Ivano-Frankivsk, Ukraine (2025)

== Gallery ==
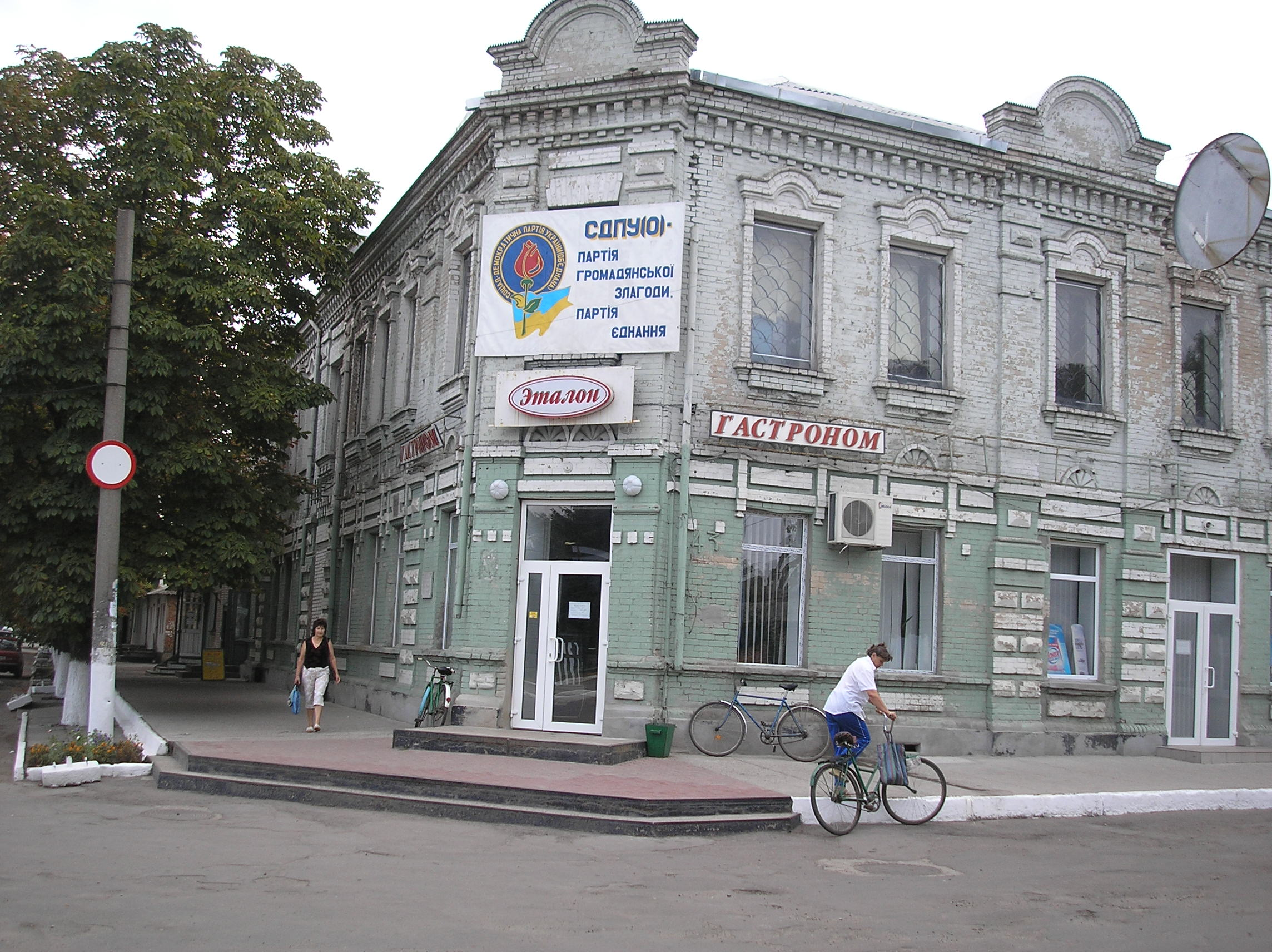
Former boys' gymnasium

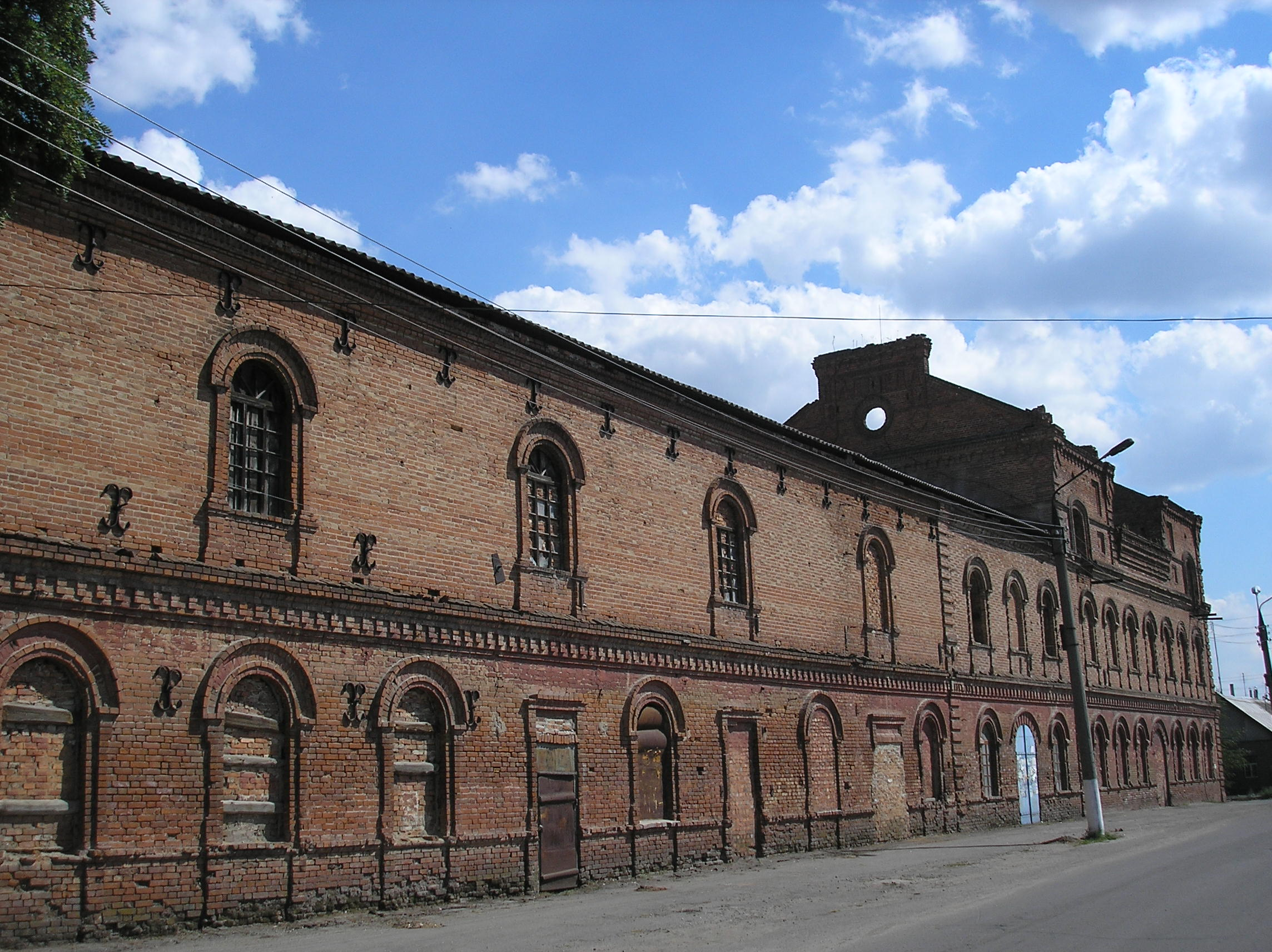
Old mill, originally owned by the German Krieger company

== Bibliography ==
- Skirda, Alexandre (2004) [1982]. Nestor Makhno–Anarchy's Cossack: The Struggle for Free Soviets in the Ukraine 1917–1921. Translated by Sharkey, Paul. Oakland: AK Press. ISBN 978-1-902593-68-5. OCLC 60602979.
