= Shabelskiy Manor =

- Усадьба Шабельских
- Location: Village of Semibalki, Azov district, Rostov region

Shabelskiy Manor (Russian: Усадьба Шабельских) is an estate in the village of Semibalki of the Azov district of the Rostov region of Russia. In the beginning several generations of landowners Shabelsky were owners of the estate, then the estate was rented by Vladimir Mikhaylovich Turkin.

== History and description ==
Pavel Vasilyevich Shabelsky bought the village of Semibalki and some part of lands of Cherkasova of a heathland from successors of their previous owner – Margarita Manuilovicha Blazo. After Pavel Vasilyevich, the estate passed into the order of his son Katon Pavlovich. In 1829–1830 the new owner lodged in these territories of 200 peasants which came from the village of Ushakovka of the Oryol region. Katon Shabelsky was a large landowner – he possessed 17 807 tithes of the earth in the territory of the villages of New Margaritovka, Semibalki, Shabelsk and Port-Katon. In the 1860s, the manor had another owner, his son is Nikolay Antonovich Shabelsky. It brought to the village from another manner of 13 families which lived in the Kharkiv province earlier. Approximately in the second half of the 19th century the mansion was built. About development and appearance of the estate of the landowner Shabelsky at the end of the 19th century a note in "The Taganrog bulletin" in which it was said that in the village of Semibalki wide streets, tidy houses, and the estate of the landowner Shabelsky differs in reserved style and fancy constructions was published. At this time the owner practically did not live in the estate. When the manor became Pavel Nikolaevich Shabelsky's property, Vladimir Mikhailovich Turkin was appointed the managing director. It was engaged in affairs of the estate and provided with earnings of peasants: the fish plant of Turkin provided to fishermen of a tackle in exchange for fish, at the same time the catch made in winter time, peasants could keep. It is known that after 1912 Turkin constructed two-cool school in Semibalkakh. He married the servant, the peasant Anna Serdyuk, in the 1920s at spouses the son was born. In 1924 the family Turkinykh was dispossessed and sent into exile. Economic constructions and church were destroyed, but the house in which there lived the landowner — remained, and often it was called not the house of Shabelsky, but Turkin's house. Till 1956 in it there took place church services, then it was a warehouse and office. In the 21st century near Turkin's house grow popular, the facade is painted in cream color.
