= Haichul =

River in Zaporizhzhia Oblast, Ukraine

Haichul Гайчул
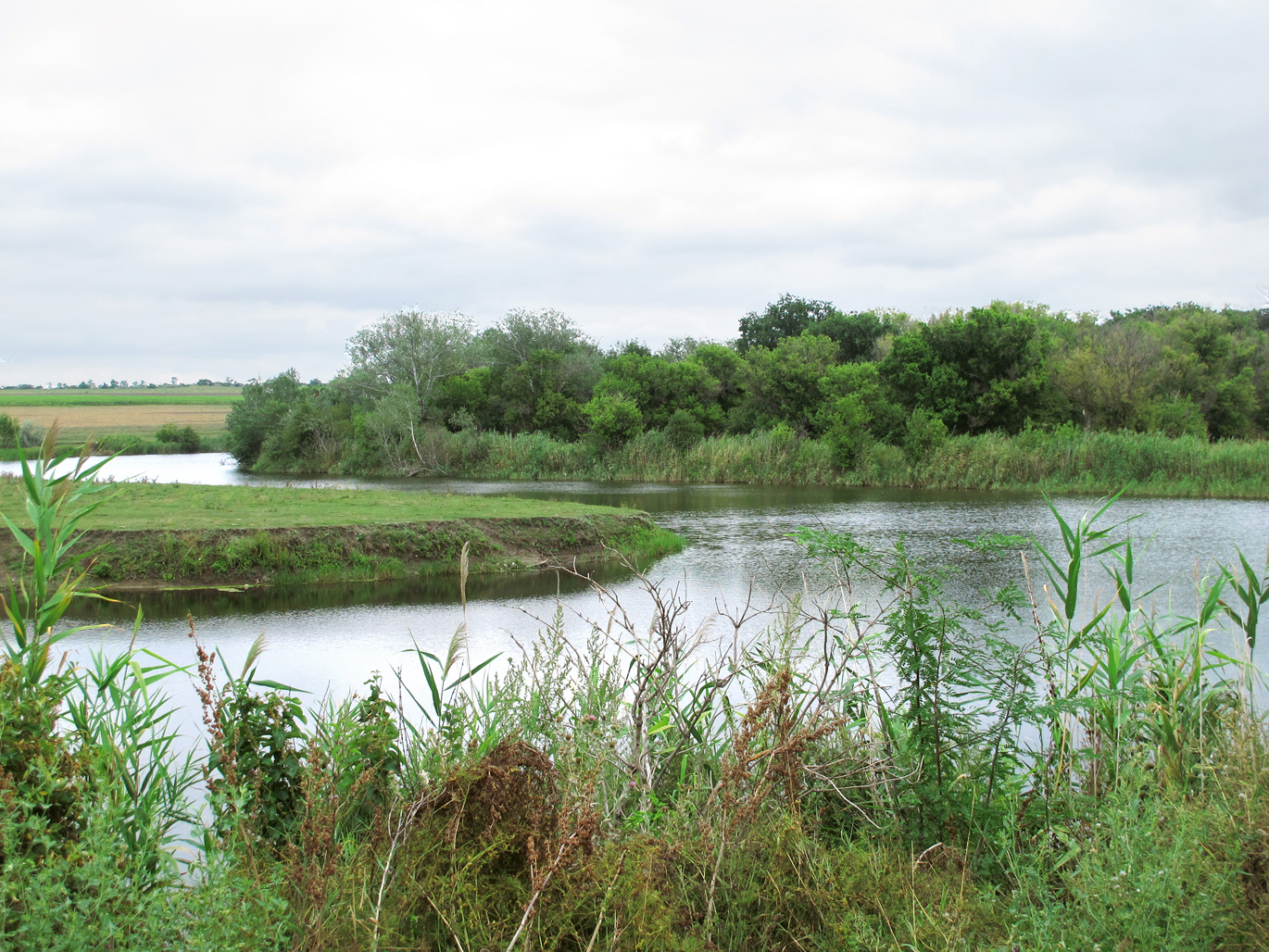
- Forest near the river

Location
- Country: Ukraine

Physical characteristics
- Source
  - location: Chervone Ozero, Zaporizhzhia Oblast, Ukraine
  - coordinates: 47°20′33″N 36°46′20″E
- Mouth
  - location: Vovcha
  - coordinates: 47°57′23″N 36°10′27″E
- Length: 130 km (81 mi)
- Basin size: 2,140 km^{2} (830 sq mi)

Basin features
- Progression: Vovcha → Samara → Dnieper→ Dnieper–Bug estuary→ Black Sea
- River system: Dnipro basin

The Haichul (Ukrainian: Гайчул) or Haichur (Ukrainian: Гайчур) is a river in southern Ukraine and a tributary of the Vovcha.

== Etymology ==
The river originated from the Tatar name "Gaichur", where Tatar hordes gathered before raids on Zaporizhzhia and left-bank Ukraine. The name later changed to "Haichul" in Ukrainian as mentioned by Dmytro Yavornytsky.

== Geography ==
The river originates near the village of Chervone Ozero, and flows mainly northwest. It flows into the Vovcha near the village of Pysantsi. The river is 130 km (81 mi) long, with a basin size of 2,140 km^{2} (830 sq mi) and a slope of 1.1m / km. The valley is between 4.5 km (2.8 mi) to 5 m (16 ft) wide, with moderate winding riverbed and several ponds.
