= Alexandrovsky Uyezd, Yekaterinoslav Governorate =

Alexandrovsk uezd Александровскій уѣздъ
- Uezd
- Coat of arms

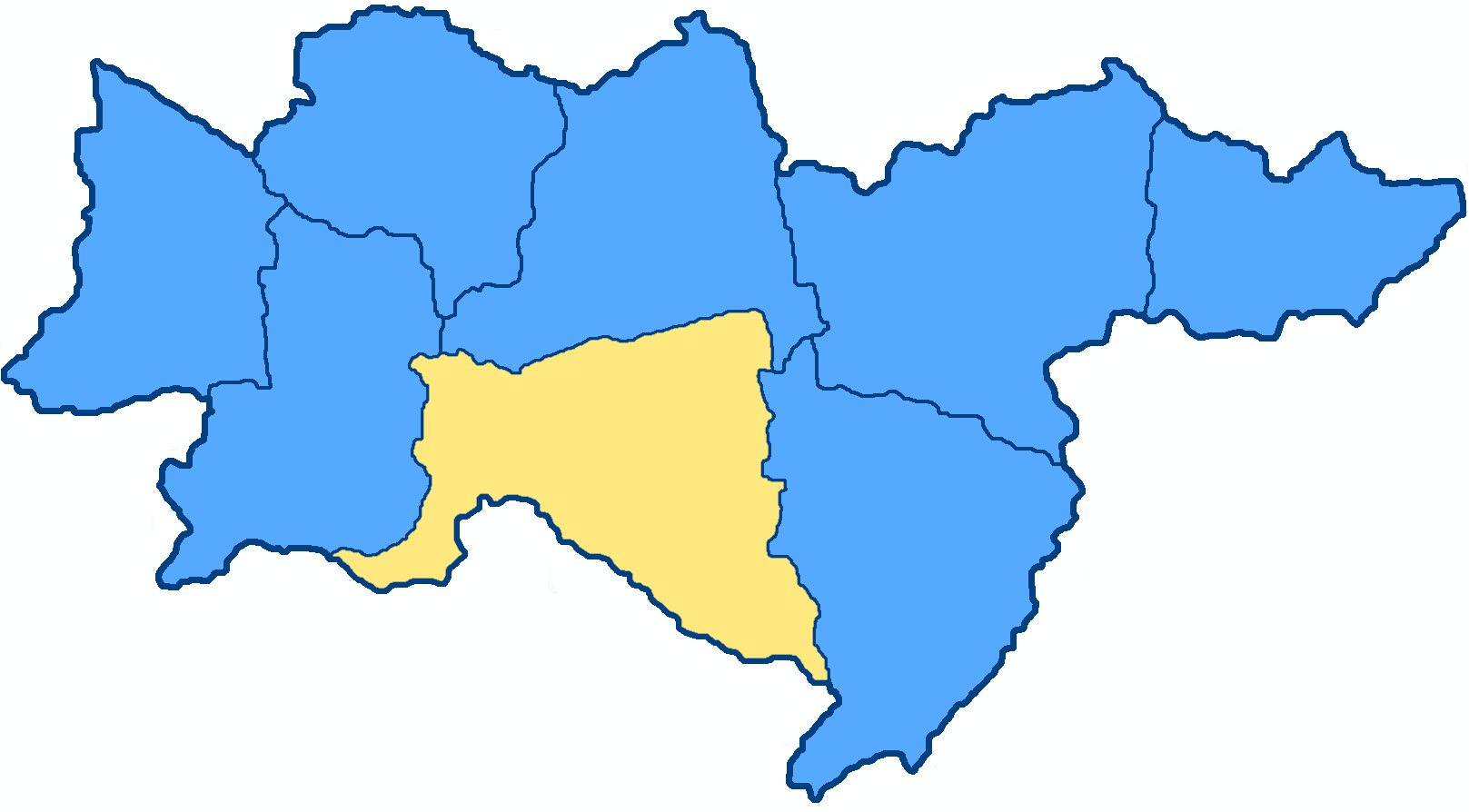
- Location in the Yekaterinoslav Governorate
- Country: Russian Empire
- Governorate: Yekaterinoslav
- Established: 1805
- Abolished: 1920
- Capital: Alexandrovsk

Area
  - Total: 26,420 km^{2} (10,200 sq mi)

Population (1897)
  - Total: 271,678
  - Density: 10.28/km^{2} (26.63/sq mi)

Alexandrovsk uezd (Russian: Александровскій уѣздъ, romanized: Aleksandrovskiy uyezd; Ukrainian: Олександрівський повіт, romanized: Oleksandrivs'kyi povit) was one of the subdivisions of the Yekaterinoslav Governorate of the Russian Empire. It was situated in the southern part of the governorate. Its administrative centre was Alexandrovsk (present-day Zaporizhzhia, Ukraine).

== History ==
Formed in 1805 as part of the Yekaterinoslav Governorate from part of the Mariupol district, which was included in the Yekaterinoslav Governorate and part of the Pavlograd district.

In March-April 1918, it became part of the Sichova and Oziv lands of the Ukrainian People's Republic.

In 1920, the county became part of the newly created Oleksandriv Province, which was renamed in 1921 to Zaporizhzhya Province. The territory of the district was reduced due to the allocation of the Gulyaipil county.

In 1922, it was joined to the Katerynoslav province in its former territory.

In 1923, it was liquidated in connection with the formation of districts in the provinces.

== Demographics ==
At the time of the Russian Empire Census of 1897, Alexandrovsky Uyezd had a population of 271,678. Of these, 82.5% spoke Ukrainian, 5.7% Russian, 5.2% German, 5.1% Yiddish, 1.2% Belarusian, 0.1% Polish and 0.1% Romani as their native language.
