= Znob-Novhorodske =

Rural locality in Sumy Oblast, Ukraine

Znob-Novhorodske Зноб-Новгородське
- Rural settlement
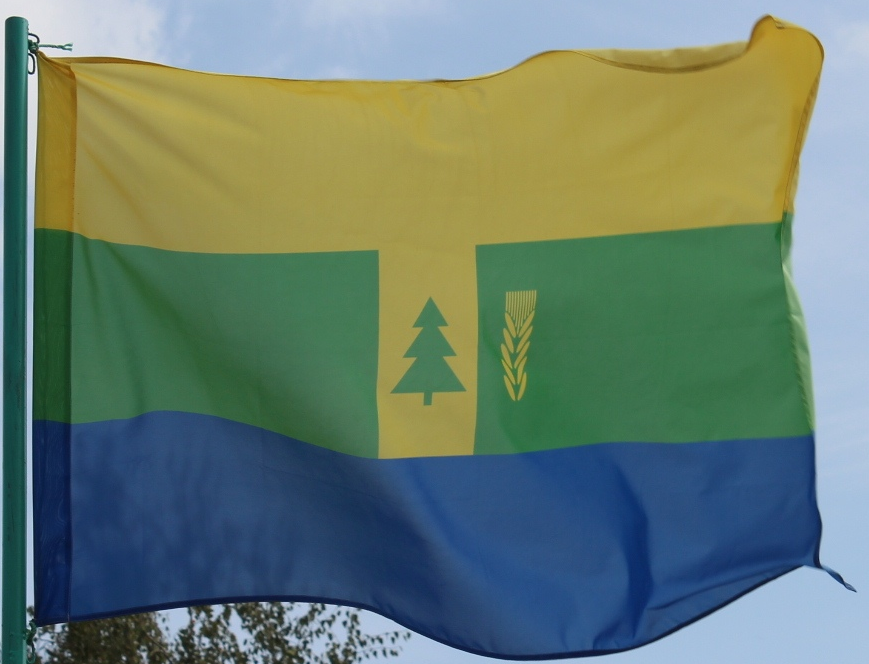
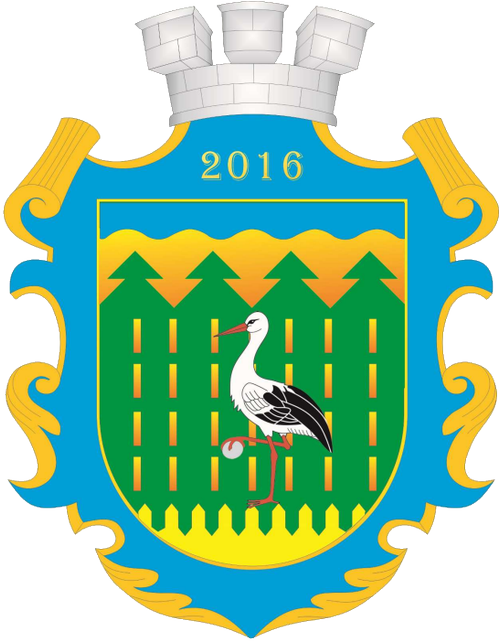
- Flag Coat of arms
- Interactive map of Znob-Novhorodske
- Location in Sumy Oblast Location in Ukraine
- Country: Ukraine
- Oblast: Sumy Oblast
- Raion: Shostka Raion
- Hromada: Znob-Novhorodske settlement hromada

Population (2022)
  - Total: 1,830
- Time zone: UTC+2 (EET)
  - Summer (DST): UTC+3 (EEST)

Znob-Novhorodske (Ukrainian: Зноб-Новгородське, Russian: Знобь-Новгородское) is a rural settlement in Shostka Raion, Sumy Oblast, Ukraine. It is located on the left bank of the Znobivka, a left tributary of the Desna, in the north of the oblast, close to the Russian border. in the drainage basin of the Dnieper. Znob-Novhorodske hosts the administration of Znob-Novhorodske settlement hromada, one of the hromadas of Ukraine. Population: 1,830 (2022 estimate).

== History ==
Until 18 July 2020, Znob-Novhorodske belonged to Seredyna-Buda Raion. The raion was abolished in July 2020 as part of the administrative reform of Ukraine, which reduced the number of raions of Sumy Oblast to five. The area of Seredyna-Buda Raion was merged into Shostka Raion.

Until 26 January 2024, Znob-Novhorodske was designated urban-type settlement. On this day, a new law entered into force which abolished this status, and Znob-Novhorodske became a rural settlement.

== Economy ==
=== Transportation ===
The settlement is connected by road with Shostka and Seredyna-Buda.
