= Yampil, Sumy Oblast =

Rural locality in Sumy Oblast, Ukraine

Yampil Ямпіль
- Rural settlement
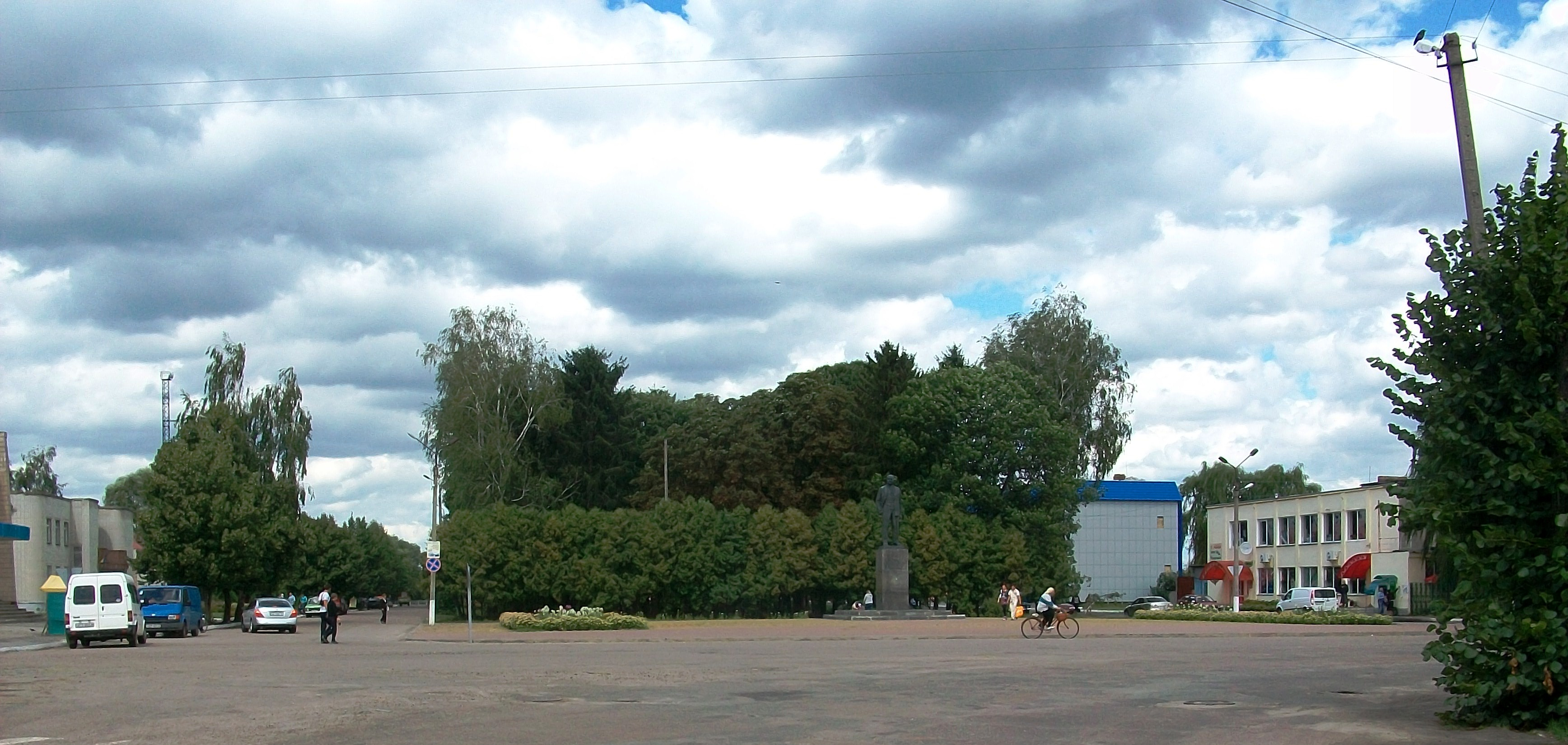
- Centre of Yampil

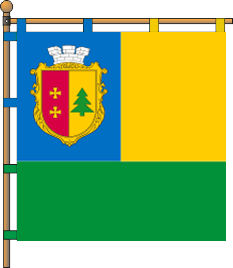
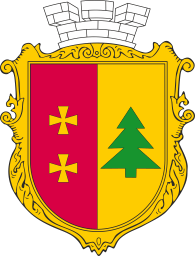
- Flag Coat of arms

- Location in Sumy Oblast Location in Ukraine
- Coordinates: 51°56′33″N 33°47′07″E
- Country: Ukraine
- Oblast: Sumy Oblast
- Raion: Shostka Raion
- Hromada: Yampil settlement hromada

Population (2022)
  - Total: 4,324
- Time zone: UTC+2 (EET)
  - Summer (DST): UTC+3 (EEST)

Yampil (Ukrainian: Ямпіль; Russian: Ямполь) is a rural settlement in Sumy Oblast, Ukraine. It was formerly the administrative center of Yampil Raion, and is now administered within Shostka Raion. It is located on the Ptushok River, a tributary of the Ivotka River in the basin of the Dnieper. Population: 4,324 (2022 estimate).

== History ==
Until 26 January 2024, Yampil was designated urban-type settlement. On this day, a new law entered into force which abolished this status, and Yampil became a rural settlement.

== Economy ==
=== Transportation ===
The settlement has road access to Shostka and to Hlukhiv where there is further access to Kyiv.

Ivotka railway station is just outside of the settlement border. It is on the railway connecting Konotop with Zernove railway station in Seredyna-Buda. There is local passenger traffic.
