= Khutir-Mykhailivskyi =

City in Sumy Oblast, Ukraine

Khutir-Mykhailivskyi Хутір-Михайлівський
- City
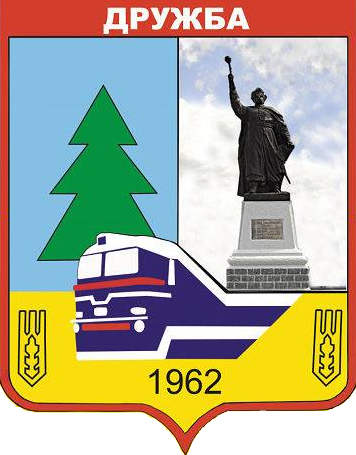
- Coat of arms

- Location of Khutir-Mykhailivskyi Khutir-Mykhailivskyi (Sumy Oblast)
- Coordinates: 52°02′55″N 33°56′35″E
- Country: Ukraine
- Oblast: Sumy Oblast
- Raion: Shostka Raion
- Hromada: Khutir-Mykhailivskyi urban hromada
- Founded: 17th century
- City status: 1962
- Named for: Mykhailo Tereshchenko

Government
  - Mayor: Vitaliy Mykolayovych Sytenko
  - Chair: Yevhen Ivanovych Kharitonov

Area
  - Total: 8.5 km^{2} (3.3 sq mi)
- Elevation: 175 m (574 ft)

Population (2022)
  - Total: 4,504
- Postal code: 41220—222
- Area code: +38 (05456)
- Website: khutir-rada.gov.ua

Khutir-Mykhailivskyi (Ukrainian: Хутір-Михайлівський), between 1962–2024 known as Druzhba (Ukrainian: Дружба, lit. 'Friendship'), is a small city in the Shostka Raion of the Sumy Oblast, in northern Ukraine. The population is 4,504 (2022 estimate).

== History ==
=== Early history ===
In the past, two settlements, Zhuravka and Yurasivka were in Cossack Hetmanate. Zhuravka village was named after the Zhuravka River (Журавка), on which it is located. In late 17th century, these villages belonged to Andriy Hamaliya, whose son was a like-minded person and supporter of Ivan Mazepa. After the Battle of Poltava (1709) tsar Peter I gave these villages to landowner Golovin, whose descendants sold them later to the Kochubey family.

In early 1830s Zhuravka, Yurasivka and their surroundings were bought by industrialist M. Tereshchenko. He founded a sugar refinery, which operated until 1995. A new settlement was formed as the factory workers settled nearby. Tereshchenko named this after his son Mykhailo. The name Khutir-Mykhailivskyi was first used in 1855 linked to construction of sugar refinery. The settlements Yurasivka and Khutir-Mykhailivskyi were then part of Glukhovsky Uyezd in Chernigov Governorate of the Russian Empire. Narrow-gauge railway was built in 1860s from line Voronezh-Zernovye. In 1907 additional railway lines were built; thus Khutir-Mykhailivskyi became a hub station.

=== Interbellum and World War II ===
In the villages subordinated to Mykhailivka Village Council, peasants were forcibly driven into collective farms in 1929–1930.

In 1932–1933 those peasants survived the Stalinist genocide of Ukrainians. During World War II, Khutir-Mykhailivskyi was occupied by Axis troops from October 1941 to August 1943. There was a concentration camp in which 17 thousand people died.

=== Post-WWII ===
In 1956 (or 1958) Khutir-Mykhailivskyi was given the status of urban-type settlement. There was a sugar plant, a cinder block factory, three secondary schools, five libraries, a club and a stadium.

The city of Druzhba was founded in 1962 when three settlements Zhuravka, Yurasivka and Khutir-Mykhailivskyi were merged together. It was part of Yampil Raion until summer 2020, when it became part of larger Shostka Raion.

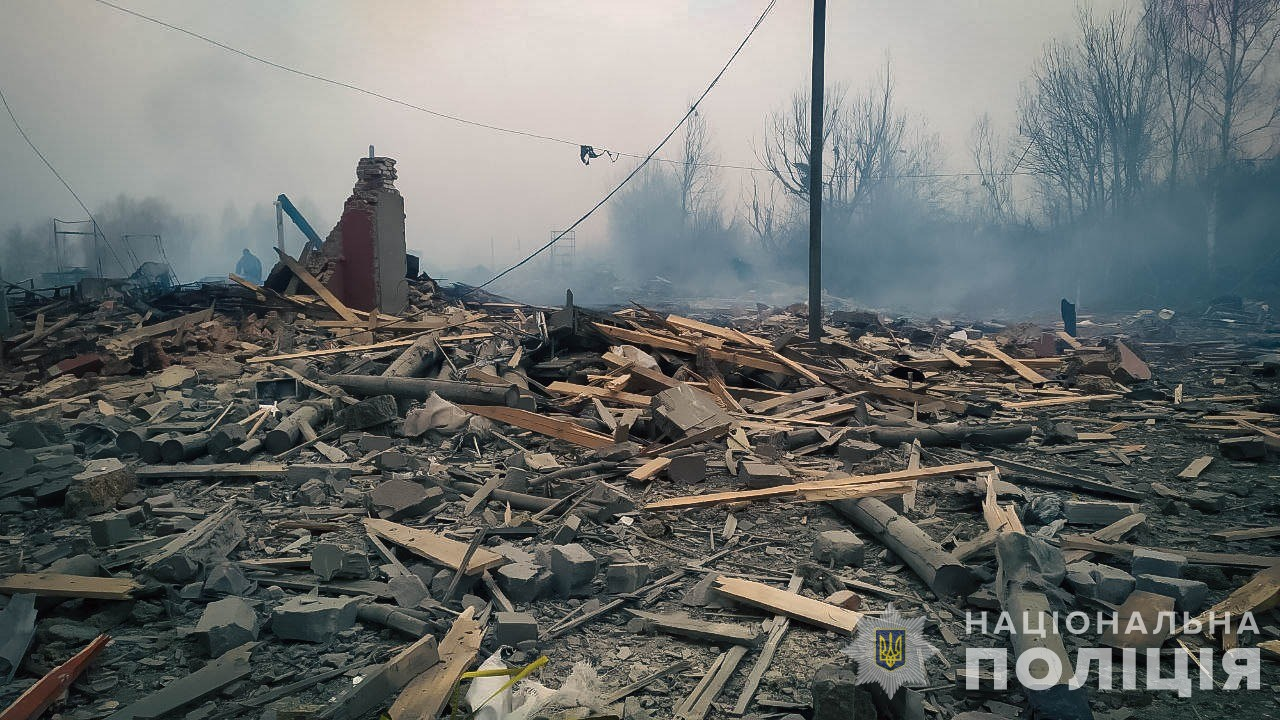
Destructions after a Russian strike, 22 March 2024

On 3 April 2024, the Committee on the Organization of State Power, Local Self-government, Regional Development, and Urban Planning in the Verkhovna Rada stated their support for renaming the city to Zhuravske (Журавське). On 19 September 2024, the Verkhovna Rada voted to rename Druzhba to Khutir-Mykhailivskyi.

== Education and culture ==
There are three schools in the city — two comprehensive I-III degrees and one comprehensive I-II degrees, a nursery-kindergarten, two hospitals, a pharmacy, a house of culture, a railwaymen club, a branch of Yampil Music and children's and youth sports schools. There are also four library establishments, a museum of local artifacts, and a stadium. There are two Orthodox churches.

In the center of the city, at the square of Eternal Glory, a memorial was erected for soldiers who died during the Second World War, there is also the tomb of an unknown soldier and mass graves.

== Demographics ==
=== Population ===
Historical population

Year	Pop.	±%
1923	798	—
1926	2,828	+254.4%
1939	3,800	+34.4%
1959	9,623	+153.2%
1970	9,714	+0.9%
1979	8,384	−13.7%

Year	Pop.	±%
1989	7,459	−11.0%
2001	5,726	−23.2%
2011	5,150	−10.1%
2012	5,104	−0.9%
2013	5,031	−1.4%
2014	4,997	−0.7%

Year	Pop.	±%
2015	4,919	−1.6%
2016	4,863	−1.1%
2017	4,832	−0.6%
2018	4,792	−0.8%
2019	4,713	−1.6%
2021	4,594	−2.5%

Source data

=== Ethnic groups ===
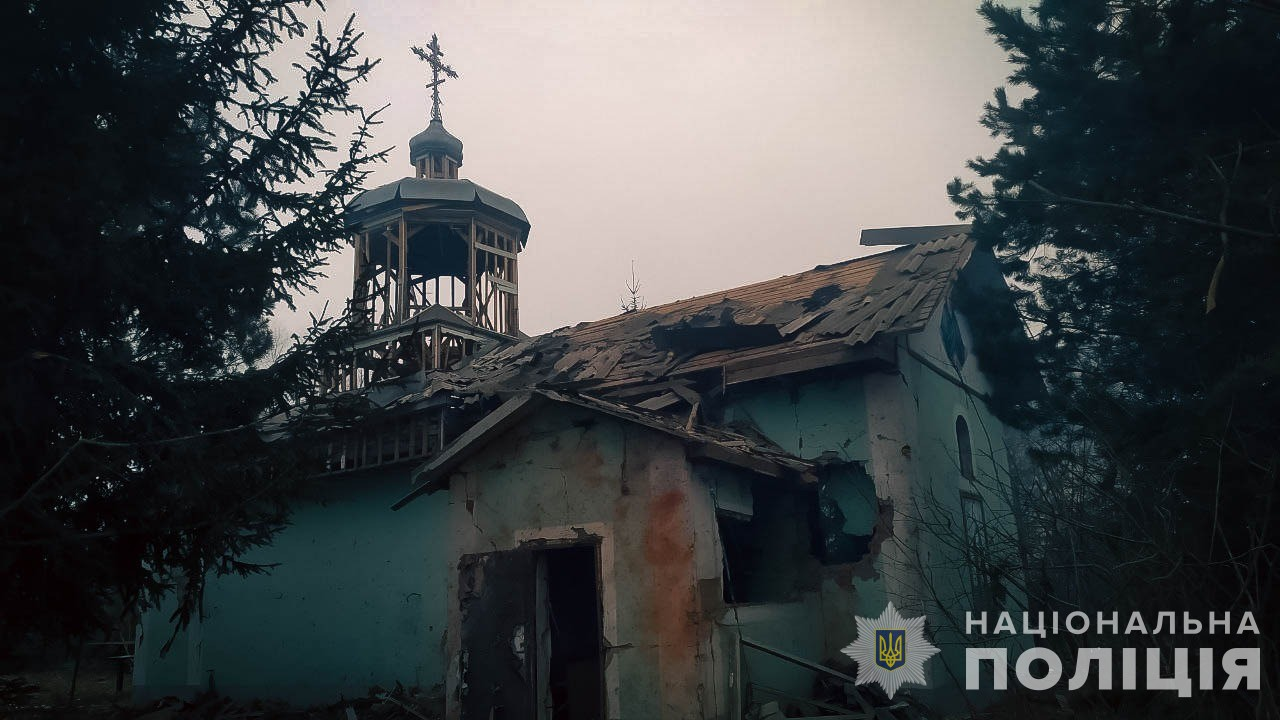
Saint Seraphim church after a Russian strike, 22 March 2024

Distribution of the population by ethnicity according to the 2001 Ukrainian census:

Ethnic groups Khutir-Mykhailivskyi
	percent
Ukrainians	85.51%
Russians	12.06%
Gypsies	1.30%
Belarusians	0.68%
Armenians	0.19%
others	0.26%

=== Native languages ===
The linguistic composition of the population according to the 2001 census:

First languages in Khutir-Mykhailivskyi
	percent
Ukrainian	57.0%
Russian	41.4%
Romani	1.2%
Belarusian	0.2%
Armenian	0.1%
others	0.1%

== Geography ==
The city is located in the northern part of Sumy Oblast and lies in the valley of the Zhuravka River and its tributaries. The southeastern part of the surrounding areas is swampy. This is the land of forests: pine grows from conifers on the hills, and spruce in the lowlands, birch, oak, alder are often found here. A quiet Ivotka River flows through the forest. The T1915 and several railway branches pass through the city.

=== Climate ===
Climate data for Druzhba, Sumy Oblast (1981–2010)
Month	Jan	Feb	Mar	Apr	May	Jun	Jul	Aug	Sep	Oct	Nov	Dec	Year
Mean daily maximum °C (°F)	−2.7 (27.1)	−2.1 (28.2)	3.6 (38.5)	12.9 (55.2)	20.0 (68.0)	23.1 (73.6)	25.0 (77.0)	24.1 (75.4)	17.8 (64.0)	10.8 (51.4)	2.6 (36.7)	−1.8 (28.8)	11.1 (52.0)
Daily mean °C (°F)	−5.6 (21.9)	−5.7 (21.7)	−0.6 (30.9)	7.5 (45.5)	13.8 (56.8)	17.3 (63.1)	19.1 (66.4)	17.8 (64.0)	12.2 (54.0)	6.4 (43.5)	−0.1 (31.8)	−4.4 (24.1)	6.5 (43.7)
Mean daily minimum °C (°F)	−8.5 (16.7)	−9.1 (15.6)	−4.3 (24.3)	2.7 (36.9)	7.9 (46.2)	11.7 (53.1)	13.4 (56.1)	12.1 (53.8)	7.5 (45.5)	2.7 (36.9)	−2.5 (27.5)	−7.0 (19.4)	2.2 (36.0)
Average precipitation mm (inches)	42.1 (1.66)	42.4 (1.67)	38.2 (1.50)	45.5 (1.79)	54.9 (2.16)	69.8 (2.75)	89.1 (3.51)	60.1 (2.37)	61.8 (2.43)	54.4 (2.14)	48.8 (1.92)	47.2 (1.86)	654.3 (25.76)
Average precipitation days (≥ 1.0 mm)	10.2	9.7	9.1	8.4	8.8	9.6	9.7	7.6	8.5	9.0	9.4	10.2	110.2
Average relative humidity (%)	85.7	83.2	78.5	71.0	68.7	73.5	74.6	74.1	79.1	82.9	87.7	84.5	78.6
Source: World Meteorological Organization

== Transport ==
The Khutir-Mikhailivskyi railway station is the first Ukrainian station on line Bryansk–Konotop. Another line connects it to Unecha and Bilopillia. The distance to Sumy via railway is 244 km (152 mi) but is only 191 km (119 mi) via highway. The distance to Kyiv via railway is 336 km (209 km) but is 344 km (214 mi) by highway.
