= Khutir-Mykhailivskyi urban hromada =

Khutir-Mykhailivskyi urban hromada Хутір-Михайлівська міська громада
- Hromada
- Interactive map of Khutir-Mykhailivskyi urban hromada
- Coordinates: 52°02′00″N 33°57′40″E
- Country: Ukraine
- Oblast: Sumy Oblast
- Raion: Shostka Raion

Government
  - Head: Yevhen Ivanovych Kharitonov (Independent)

Area
  - Total: 126.4 km^{2} (48.8 sq mi)

Population (2022)
  - Total: 5,700
  - Density: 45/km^{2} (120/sq mi)
- Settlements: 15
- Cities: 1
- Rural settlements: 0
- Villages: 14
- Website: https://khutir-rada.gov.ua/

Khutir-Mykhailivskyi urban hromada (Ukrainian: Хутір-Михайлівська міська громада) is a hromada of Ukraine, located in Shostka Raion, Sumy Oblast. Its administrative center is the city of Khutir-Mykhailivskyi, and as of 2022 the population was around 5,700 people.

The hromada, then known as Druzhba urban hromada, was created on 12 August 2016 and was part of the Yampil Raion until 18 July 2020 when it was merged into the larger Shostka Raion.

The hromada includes 15 settlements: 1 city (Khutir-Mykhailivskyi) and 14 villages:

- Buhor
- Chuikivka
- Dovzhyk
- Doroshenkove
- Doroshivka
- Kosynske
- Mykytske
- Obiednane
- Palashchenkove
- Romankove
- Vasylets
