= Hlazove =

Hlazove Глазове
- Village
- Location within Ukraine Location within Sumy Oblast
- Coordinates: 52°7′26″N 33°29′22″E
- Country: Ukraine
- Oblast: Sumy Oblast
- District: Shostka Raion
- First mention: 1620
- Elevation: 138 m (453 ft)

Population (2001)
  - Total: 524
- Time zone: UTC+02:00 (EET)
  - Summer (DST): UTC+03:00 (EEST)
- Postal index: 41110
- Area code: +380 5449

Hlazove (Ukrainian: Глазове, Russian: Глазово, romanized: Glazovo) is a village in Shostka Raion, Sumy Oblast, Ukraine.
