= Desna–Stara Huta National Nature Park =

National park in Ukraine

- Ukrainian: Деснянсько-Старогутський національний природний парк
- IUCN category II (national park)
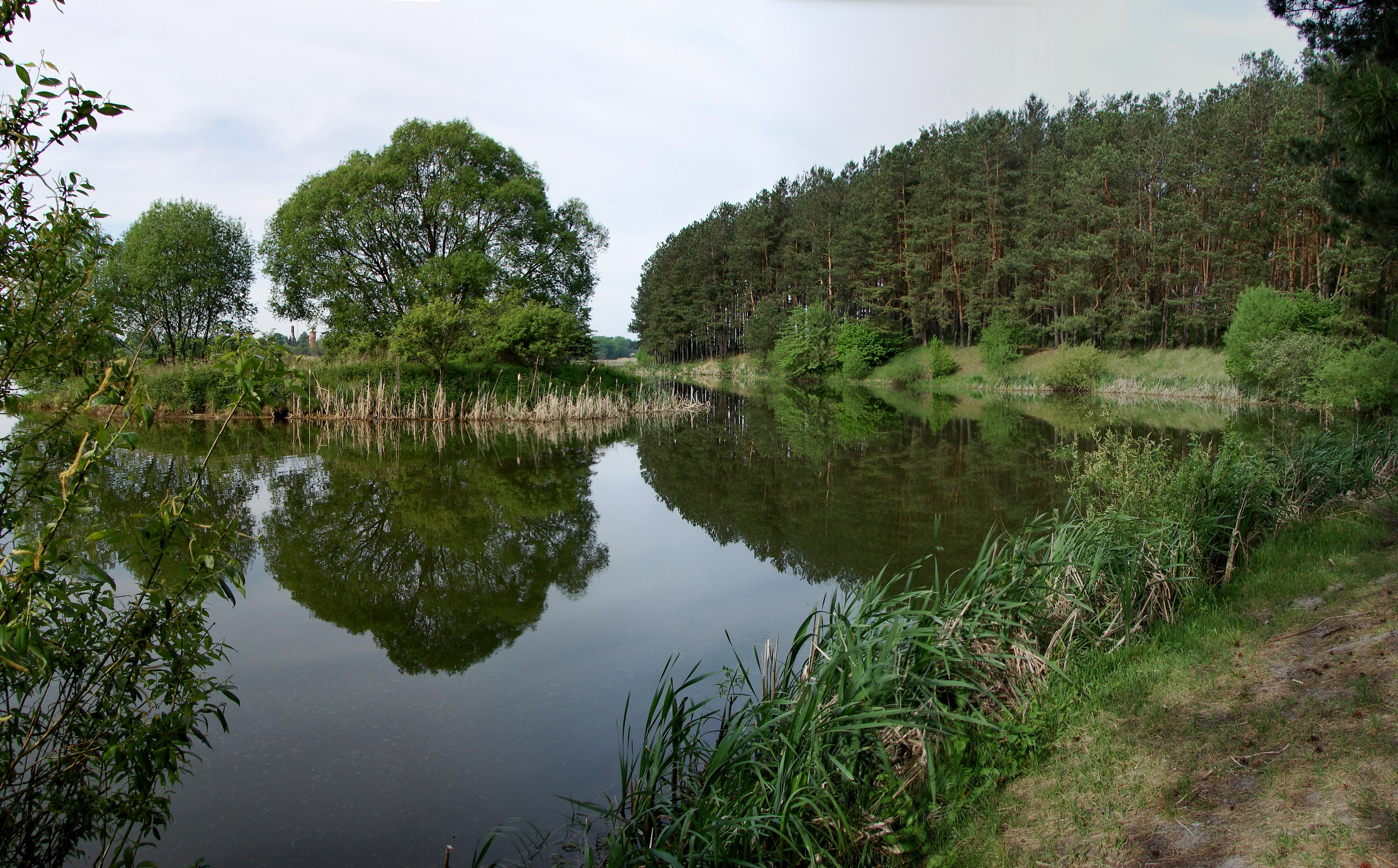
- Desna–Stara Huta National Park

- Location within Ukraine
- Location: Sumy Oblast
- Nearest city: Seredyna-Buda
- Coordinates: 52°9′57″N 33°24′59″E
- Area: 16,215 hectares (40,068 acres; 162 km^{2}; 63 sq mi)
- Established: 1999
- Governing body: Ministry of Ecology and Natural Resources (Ukraine)
- Website: http://www.nppds.inf.ua/index.html

The Desna–Stara Huta National Nature Park (Ukrainian: Деснянсько-Старогутський національний природний парк, romanized: Desniansko-Starohutskyi National Nature Park), covers a middle section of the Desna River in northeastern Ukraine, representing the variety of wetland and mixed forest landscapes of the eastern Polesia region. The national park contains two sections, one on the floodplains of the Desna, the other in the southern region of the Bryansk forest on the Russian border. The area is relatively clean, ecologically, being clear of the radiological zone and being in a non-industrial region. The park is in the administrative district of Shostka Raion in Sumy Oblast. A component of the park is a Ramsar wetland site of international importance "Desna River Floodplains". It is also component of the Desna Biosphere Reserve, designated in 2009 by the UNESCO Man and Biosphere (MAB) Reserve Programme.

== Topography ==
Desna-Stara Huta National Nature Park sits in the river valley of middle Desna, about 300 km upstream from where the Desna meets the Dnieper River near Kyiv. The terrain in the park was laid down by glacial deposits of sand and gravel in the last ice age. The flat landscape features rivers and oxbow lakes of the meandering Desna, and also extensive marshes and swamps. The location is on the eastern edge of the Polesia region of forest and lowland marshes that reaches from Poland in the west, to the Central Russian Uplands in the east.

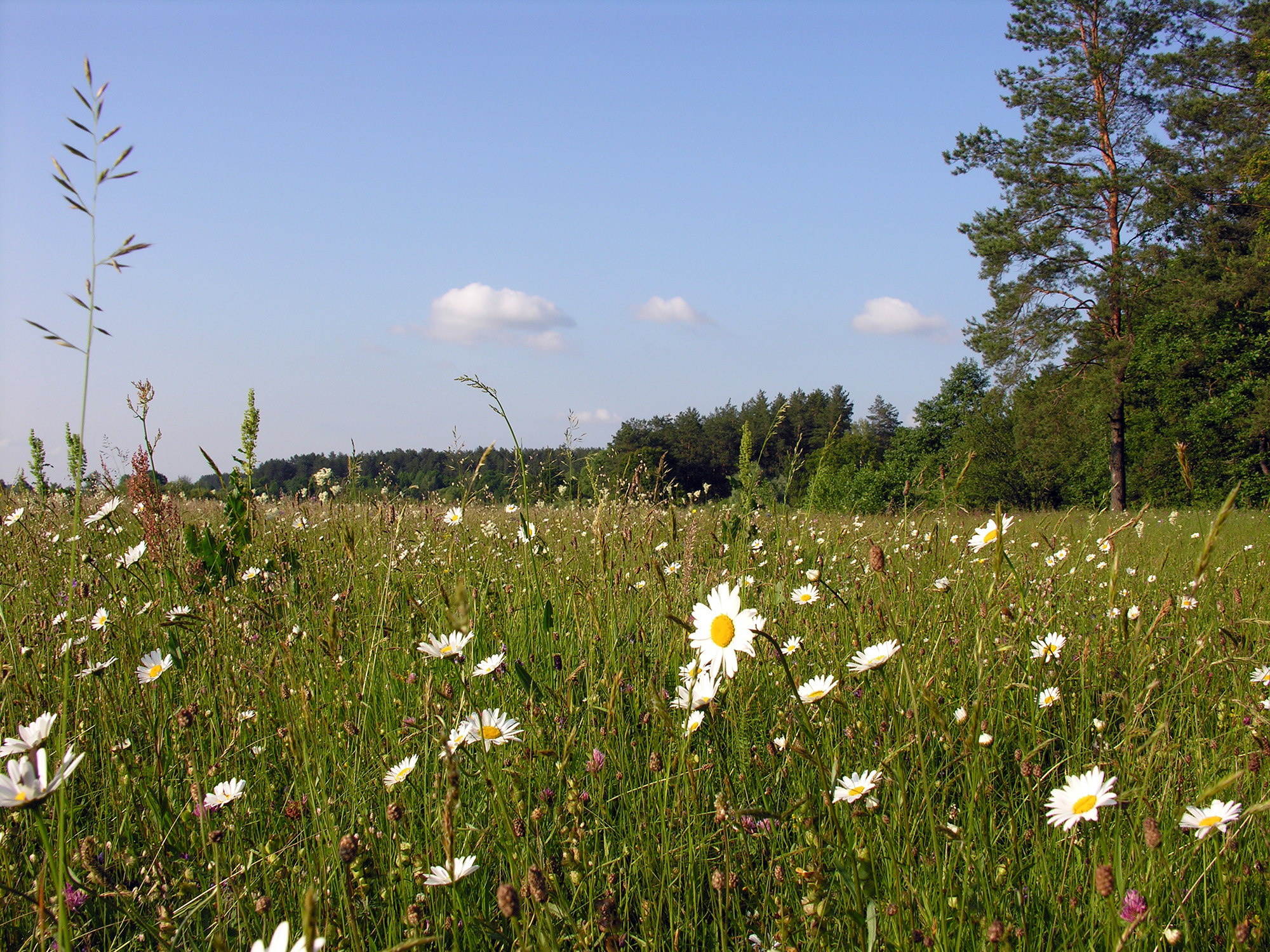
Meadow and forest in Desna–Stara Huta NNP

== Climate and ecoregion ==
The climate of Desna-Stara Huta is Humid continental climate, warm summer (Köppen climate classification (Dfb)). This climate is characterized by large swings in temperature, both diurnally and seasonally, with mild summers and cold, snowy winters.

The park is in the Central European mixed forests ecoregion.

== Flora and fauna ==
The western section of the park, on the Desna ("Desna"), features relatively pure water, as the Desna has not been dammed at this point. The area includes wide meadows with tall grasses, alder swamps, and forest stands of ash, oak, and aspen. The eastern ("Stara Huta"), section of the park includes the southern part of the Bryansk Forest that extends into Russia. The Stara Huta section is mostly pine forest, with few stands of broad leaf trees. Typical large mammals are elk, roe deer, wild swine, squirrel, hare and wolf. In recent years, beavers have reappeared in the marshy areas. Bird life is noteworthy, with 134 species recorded as breeding in the park. The aquatic communities include the vulnerable Sterlet, and the near-threatened Eurasian otter.

== Public use ==
There are recreational facilities in each of the main sections, with heated cabins available for rent, boats, fishing, and campsites. Park administration requests checking in with the visitor center to register and for review of the park's rules. In the Desna section there is an educational ecological trail, "Vizytivka Desny", that works its way through the various habitats of the Desna floodplain terraces. There is a visitor center with library and videos, and park scientists sponsor educational programs for local school groups.

== See also ==
- National Parks of Ukraine
