= Hlukhiv urban hromada =

Modern Hromada of Ukraine

Hlukhiv urban hromada Глухівська міська громада
- Hromada
- Interactive map of Hlukhiv urban hromada
- Coordinates: 51°37′N 33°53′E
- Country: Ukraine
- Oblast: Sumy Oblast
- Raion: Shostka Raion
- Admin. center: Hlukhiv

Government
  - Head: Nadiia Vailo (Independent)

Area
  - Total: 453.6 km^{2} (175.1 sq mi)

Population (2020)
  - Total: 38,382
  - Density: 84.62/km^{2} (219.2/sq mi)
- Settlements: 25
- Cities: 1
- Rural settlements: 1
- Villages: 23

The Hlukhiv urban hromada (Ukrainian: Глухівська міська громада) is a hromada of Ukraine, located in Shostka Raion, Sumy Oblast. It was legally formed during Ukraine's nationwide administrative reforms in 2020 after the Hlukhiv Raion and three other raions were combined to form the Shostka Raion.

It has an area of 453.6 km^{2} (175.1 sq mi) and a population of 38,382, as of 2020.

The hromada includes 25 settlements: 1 city (Hlukhiv), 1 rural settlement (Budivelne), and 23 villages:

- Banychi
- Bilokopytove
- Budyshcha
- Dunaievets
- Hodunivka
- Ionyne
- Kaliuzhne
- Khotmynivka
- Kravchenkove
- Matskove
- Moskalenky
- Nekrasove
- Peremoha
- Poloshky
- Pryvillia
- Semenivka
- Shchebry
- Sliporod
- Sutysky
- Uzdytsia
- Viktorove
- Voznesenske
- Zarutske
