= Yampil Raion, Sumy Oblast =

Former subdivision of Sumy Oblast, Ukraine

Yampil Raion Ямпільський район
- Raion
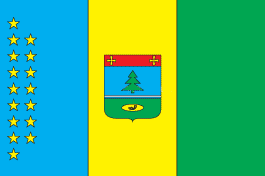
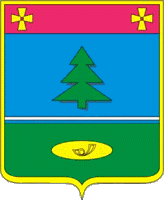
- Flag Coat of arms

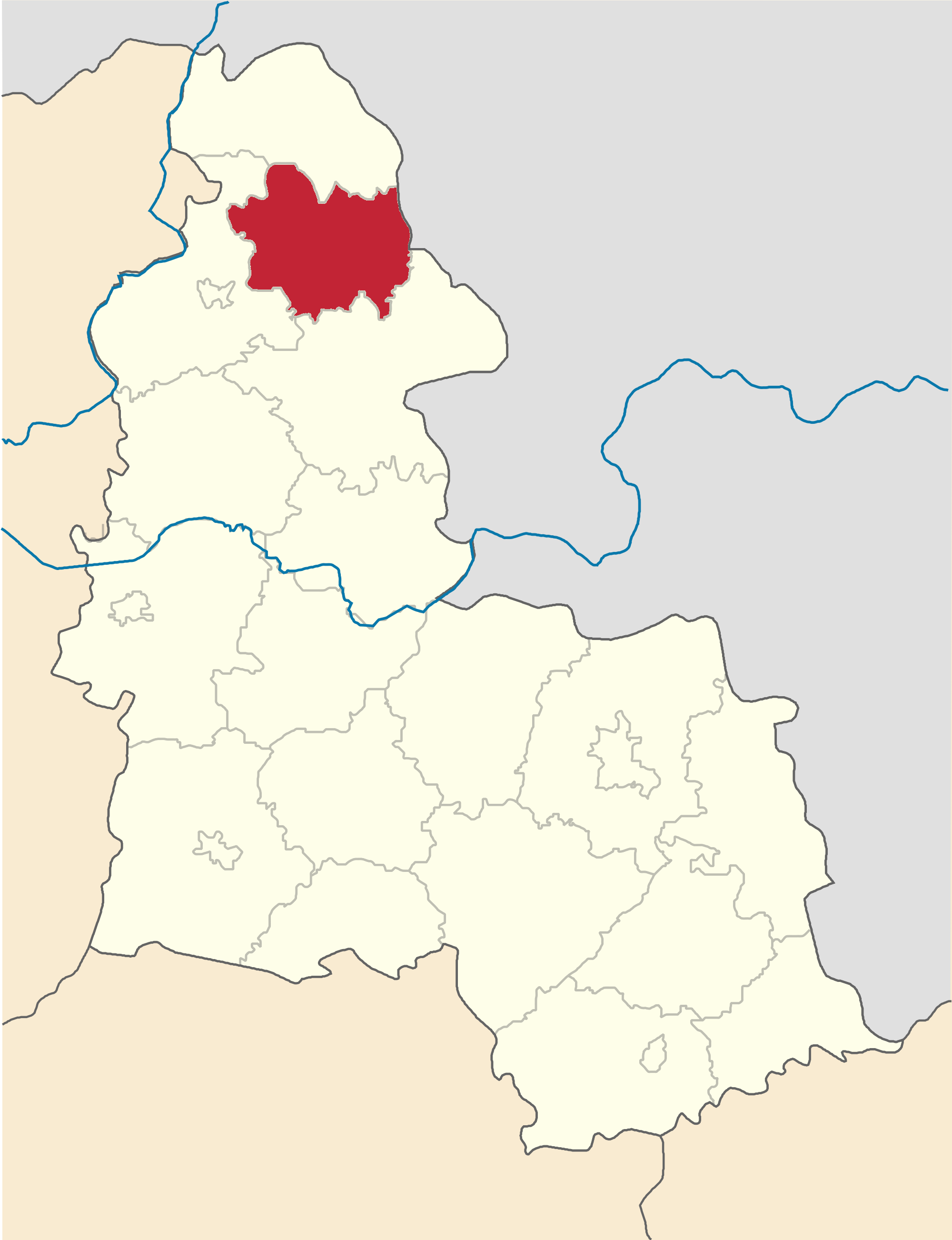
- Raion location in Sumy Oblast prior to July 2020
- Coordinates: 51°57′58.5216″N 33°51′13.9788″E
- Country: Ukraine
- Oblast: Sumy Oblast
- Disestablished: 18 July 2020
- Admin. center: Yampil

Area
  - Total: 943.5 km^{2} (364.3 sq mi)

Population (2020)
  - Total: 22,412
  - Density: 23.75/km^{2} (61.52/sq mi)
- Time zone: UTC+2 (EET)
  - Summer (DST): UTC+3 (EEST)
- Website: http://yamp.gov.ua/

Yampil Raion (Ukrainian: Ямпільський район) was a raion in Sumy Oblast in Central Ukraine. The administrative center of the raion was the urban-type settlement of Yampil. The raion was abolished on 18 July 2020 as part of the administrative reform of Ukraine, which reduced the number of raions of Sumy Oblast to five. The area of Yampil Raion became part of the enlarged Shostka Raion. The last estimate of the raion population was 22,412 (2020 est.).
