= Hlukhiv Raion =

Former subdivision of Sumy Oblast, Ukraine

Hlukhiv Raion Глухівський район
- Raion
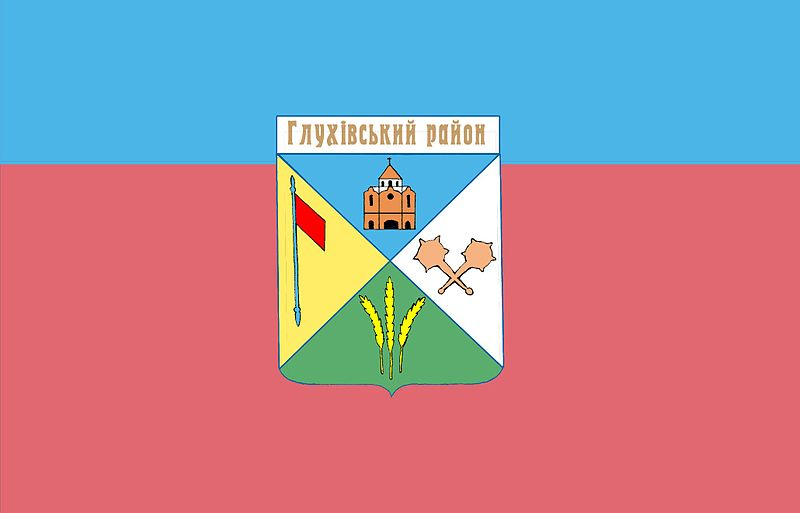
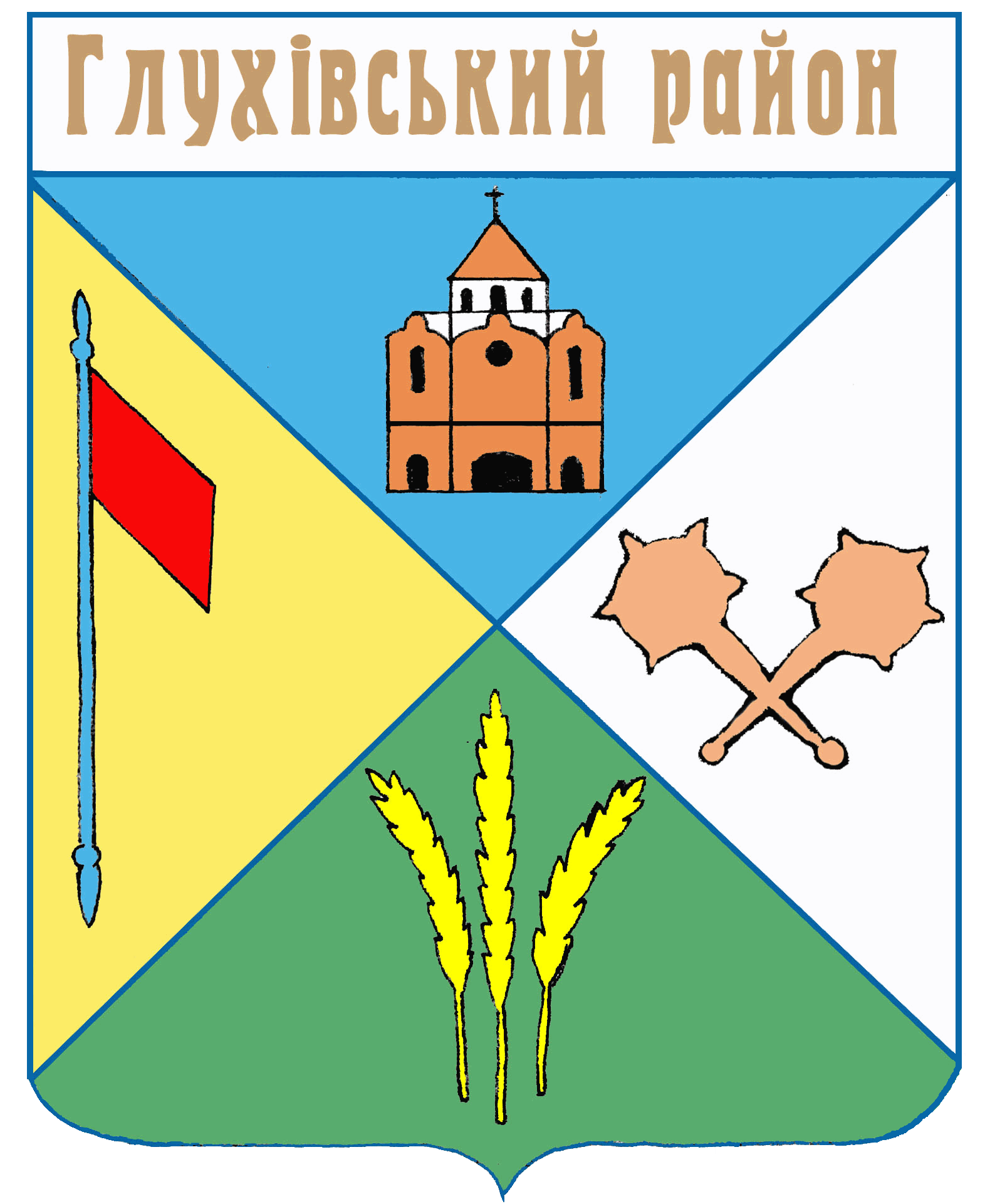
- Flag Coat of arms

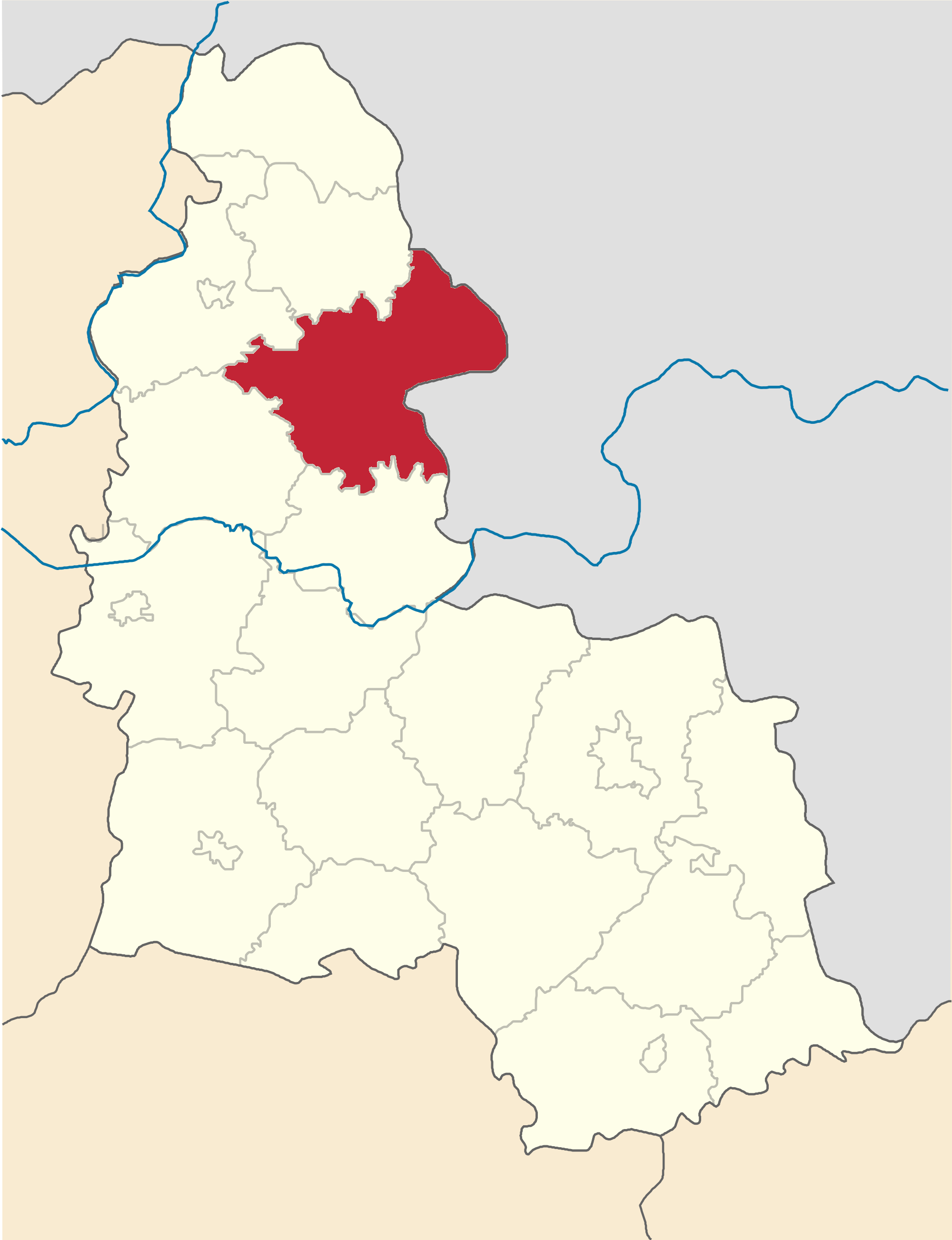
- Raion location in Sumy Oblast
- Coordinates: 51°42′7.8552″N 34°0′25.236″E
- Country: Ukraine
- Oblast: Sumy Oblast
- Disestablished: 18 July 2020
- Admin. center: Hlukhiv

Area
  - Total: 1,700 km^{2} (660 sq mi)

Population (2020)
  - Total: 21,243
  - Density: 12/km^{2} (32/sq mi)
- Time zone: UTC+2 (EET)
  - Summer (DST): UTC+3 (EEST)
- Website: http://glh.sm.gov.ua/index.php/uk/

Hlukhiv Raion (Ukrainian: Глухівський район) was a raion in Sumy Oblast in Central Ukraine. The administrative center of the raion was the town of Hlukhiv, which was administratively incorporated as a city of oblast significance and did not belong to the raion. The raion was abolished on 18 July 2020 as part of the administrative reform of Ukraine, which reduced the number of raions of Sumy Oblast to five. The last estimate of the raion population was 21,243 (2020 est.).

Before the Raion was dissolved the Raion had 4 Hormadas:

- Hlukhiv urban hromada
- Berezivska rural hromada
- Esman settlement hromada
- Shalyhyne settlement hromada
