= Seredyna-Buda =

City in Sumy Oblast, Ukraine

Seredyna-Buda Середина-Буда
- City
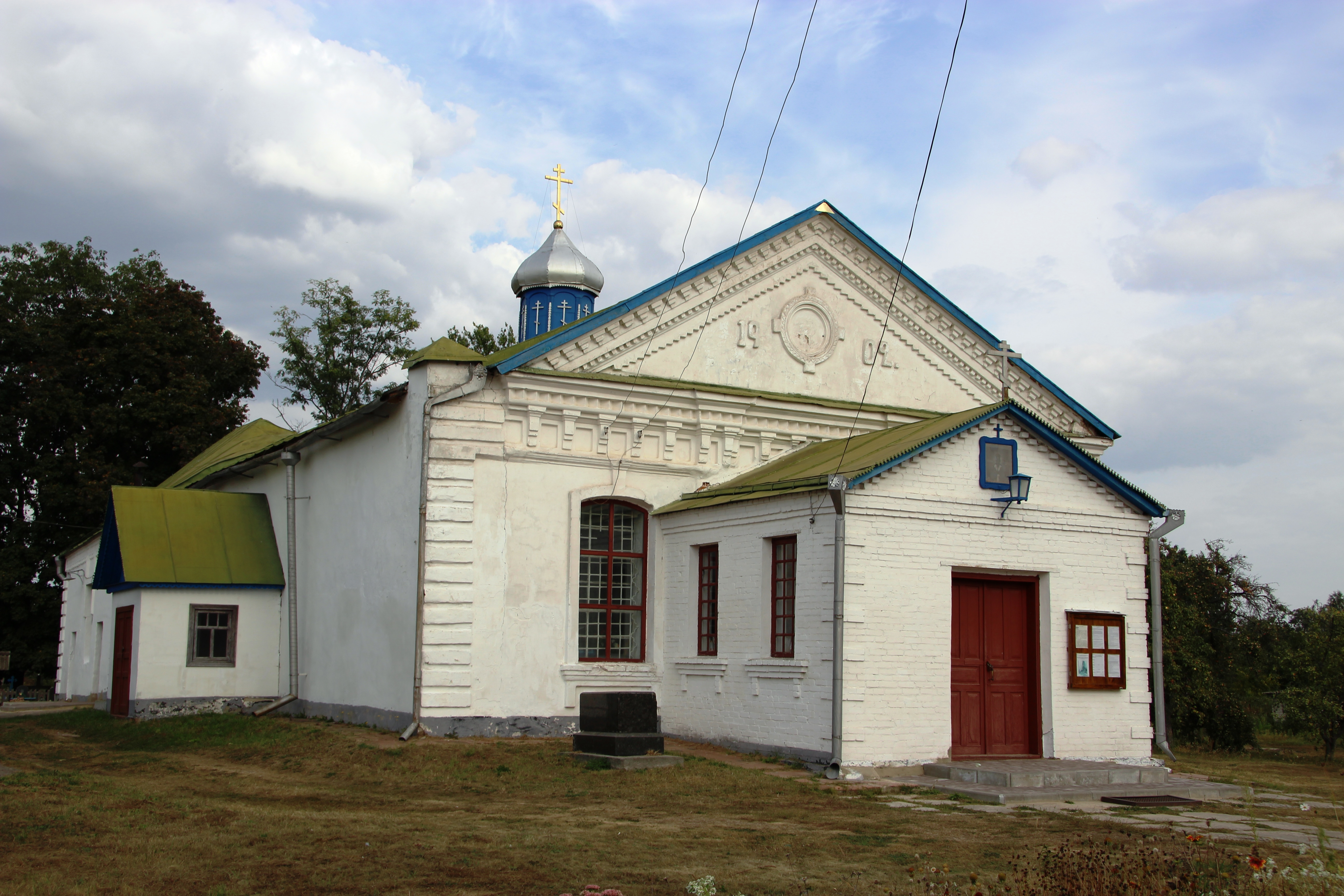
- Saint Nicholas Church

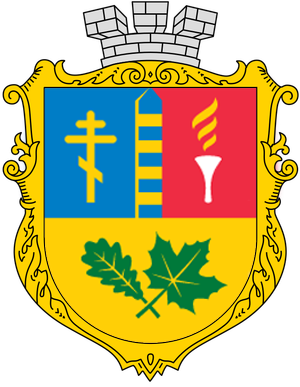
- Coat of arms
- Interactive map of Seredyna-Buda
- Location of Seredyna-Buda Seredyna-Buda (Ukraine)
- Coordinates: 52°11′09″N 34°02′18″E
- Country: Ukraine
- Oblast: Sumy Oblast
- Raion: Shostka Raion
- Hromada: Seredyna-Buda urban hromada
- Founded: 1650

Government
  - Mayor: Oleksandr Hryhorovych

Area
  - Total: 27.03 km^{2} (10.44 sq mi)

Population (2001)
  - Total: 7,500
- Postal code: 41000
- Website: https://web.archive.org/web/20140222101001/http://s-buda.gov.ua/

Seredyna-Buda (Ukrainian: Середина-Буда, IPA: [seˈrɛdenɐ ˈbudɐ]) is a city in Shostka Raion of Sumy Oblast of northeastern Ukraine. It was the administrative center of Seredyna-Buda Raion until it was abolished on 18 July 2020. It is located on Bryansk to Konotop branch line and is served by the railway station Zernove. Population: 6,888 (2022 estimate). In 2001, the population was 7,500.

== Geography ==
Seredina-Buda is located on the border of Ukraine with Russia, on the slopes of the Central Russian Upland. The climate is moderately continental. Winter is cool, summer is not hot. The average temperature in July is +19 °C, in January -7.5 °C. The maximum amount of precipitation falls in the summer in the form of rain. The average annual amount is from 650 mm.

Seredina-Buda is located in the Desna River basin (Dnieper basin). The territory is covered with coniferous and deciduous forests. The most common forests are pine, oak-linden and oak. The forests are rich in mushrooms and berries.

== History ==
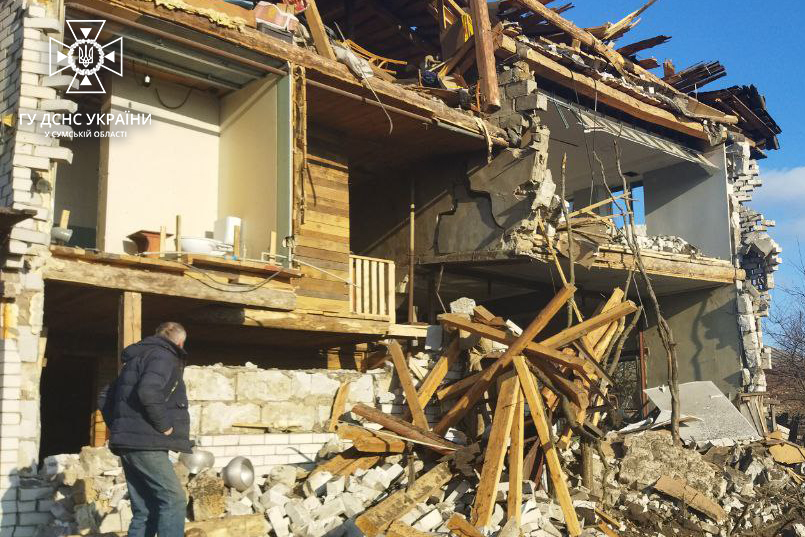
Seredyna-Buda after Russian shelling, 2023

Seredyna-Buda was founded in the 17th century by Old Believers migrated from Russia. It has had town status since 1964.

During World War II, the German occupiers operated the AGSSt 3 assembly center for prisoners of war in Seredyna-Buda.

As of May 17, 2022, it was one of the cities in the territory where active hostilities with Russian Armed Forces were conducted during the Russo-Ukrainian war.

== Demographics ==
As of the 2001 Ukrainian census, Seredyna-Buda had a population of 7,526 inhabitants. Ethnic Ukrainians constitute a strong majority, yet Russian is most common language in the settlement due to its proximity to the Russian border. The exact ethnic and linguistic composition was as follows:

Ethnic groups in Seredyna-Buda
	percent
Ukrainians	81.58%
Russians	17.57%
Belarusians	0.28%
Armenians	0.13%
others	0.44%

Native languages (2001)
	percent
Russian	86.1%
Ukrainian	13.8%
others	0.1%
