= Shostka Raion =

Subdivision of Sumy Oblast, Ukraine

Shostka Raion Шосткинський район
- Raion
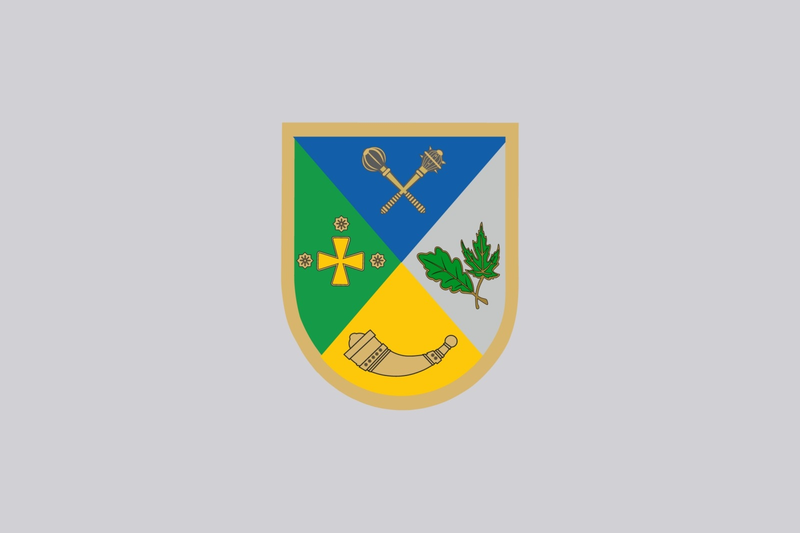
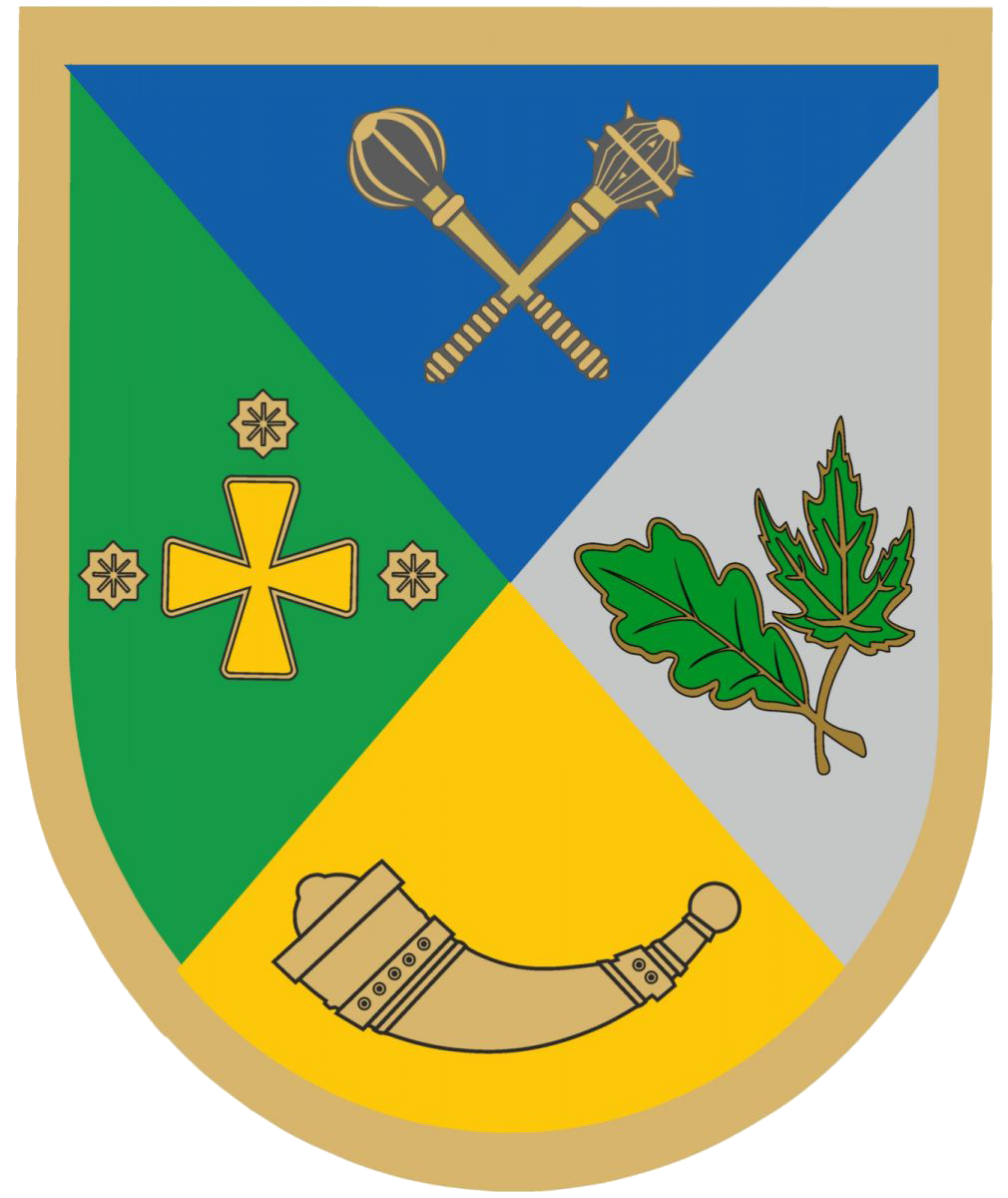
- Flag Coat of arms

- Raion location in Sumy Oblast
- Coordinates: 51°52′18.0474″N 33°25′21.1722″E
- Country: Ukraine
- Oblast: Sumy Oblast
- Admin. center: Shostka
- Subdivisions: 10 hromadas

Area
  - Total: 5,066.1 km^{2} (1,956.0 sq mi)

Population (2022)
  - Total: 179,432
  - Density: 35.418/km^{2} (91.733/sq mi)
- Time zone: UTC+2 (EET)
  - Summer (DST): UTC+3 (EEST)
- Website: http://shst.sm.gov.ua/index.php/uk/

Shostka Raion (Ukrainian: Шосткинський район) is a raion (district) of Sumy Oblast in central Ukraine. The administrative center of the raion is the town of Shostka. Population: 179,432 (2022 estimate).

On 18 July 2020, as part of the administrative reform of Ukraine, the number of the raions in the Sumy Oblast was reduced to five, and the area of the Shostka Raion was significantly expanded. The January 2020 estimate of the raion population was 19,420 (2020 est.).

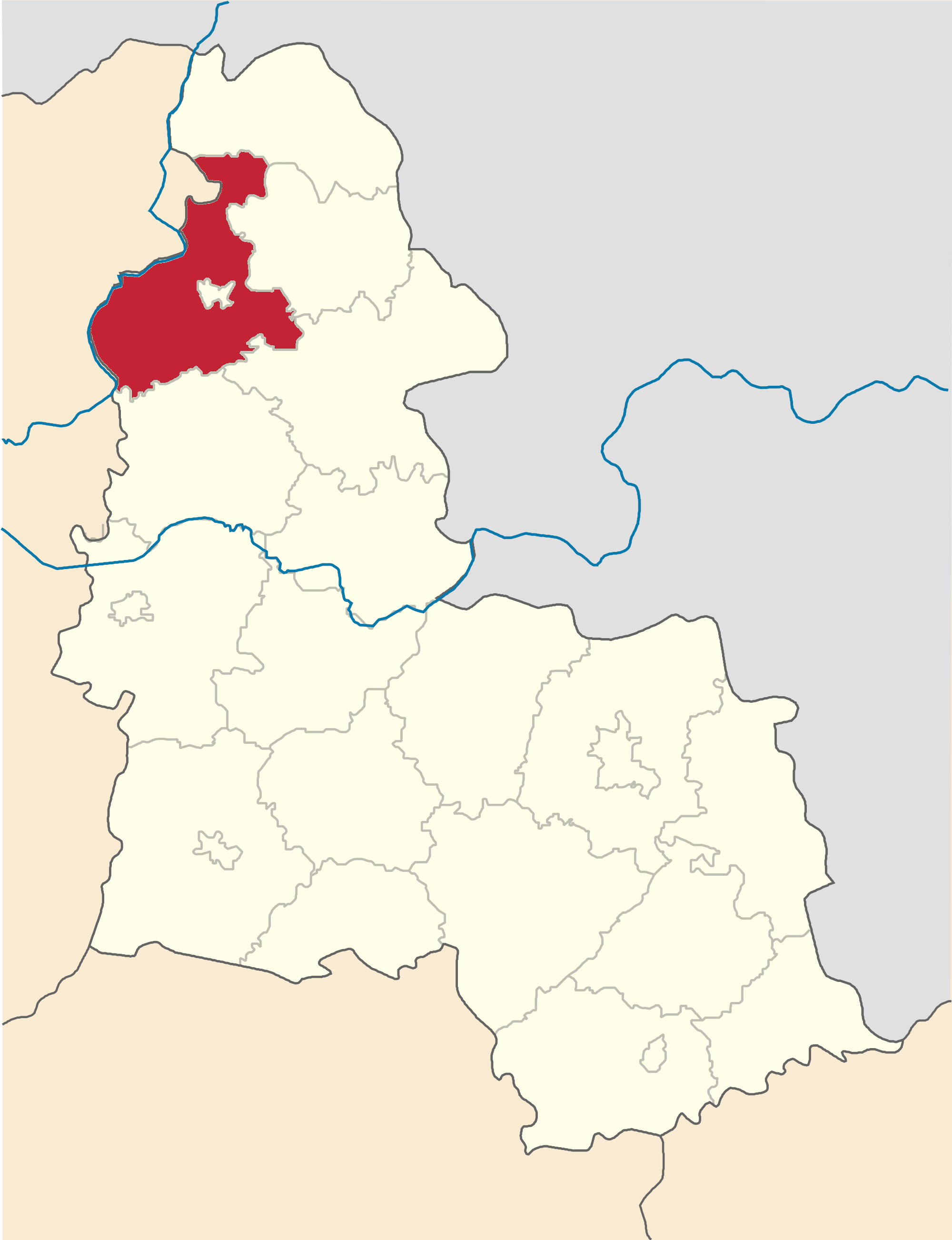
Location of Shostka Raion prior to the 2020 Administrative divisions of Ukraine

== Geographic characteristics ==
The area of the raion is 5066.09 km^{2}. Shostka Raion is located on the slopes of the Central Russian Plain. The relief of the raion is mostly lowland. Shostka Raion has reserves of silt, sapropel, peat.

The climate is moderately continental. Winter is cool, summer is not hot. The average temperature in July is +19 °C, in January -7.5 °C. The maximum precipitation falls in the summer in the form of rain. The average annual amount is from 650 to 700 mm, changing from west to east.

The left tributaries of the Desna River flow through the Shostka Raion. The river in the floodplain has many oxbow lakes and artificial lakes.

The territory of the raion is covered with coniferous and broad-leaved forests. The most common forests are pine, oak-linden, and oak. The forests of Shostka Raion are rich in mushrooms and berries. Among the mushrooms, chanterelles, tricholoma equestre, suillus luteus, armillaria mellea, russula and porcini mushrooms predominate. The most common berries are blueberries, raspberries, and blackberries.

Desna–Stara Huta National Nature Park is located in Shostka Raion in the Desna Valley. The area includes wide meadows with tall grasses, alder bogs and forest stands of ash, oak and aspen. Typical large mammals are elk, roe deer, wild boar, squirrels, beavers, hares and wolves. The park is home to 134 species of birds. The rivers are home to the sterlet and the endangered Eurasian otter.

== Hromadas ==
The number of settlements is 247. The number of cities is 4. The Shostka Raion includes 10 hromadas (communities). It includes:

- Shostka urban hromada
- Hlukhiv urban hromada
- Khutir-Mykhailivskyi urban hromada
- Seredyna-Buda urban hromada
- Esman settlement hromada
- Znob-Novhorodske settlement hromada,
- Svesa settlement hromada
- Shalyhyne settlement hromada
- Yampil settlement hromada
- Bereza rural hromada.

== Transport ==
Shostka railway station carries out cargo and passenger transportation within Sumy Oblast and in the direction of Kyiv.

== Bibliography ==
- Національний атлас України/НАН України, Інститут географії, Державна служба геодезії, картографії та кадастру; голов. ред. Л. Г. Руденко; голова ред. кол.Б.Є. Патон. — К.: ДНВП «Картографія», 2007. — 435 с. — 5 тис.прим. — ISBN 978-966-475-067-4.
- Географічна енциклопедія України : [у 3 т.] / редкол.: О. М. Маринич (відповід. ред.) та ін. — К., 1989—1993. — 33 000 екз. — ISBN 5-88500-015-8.
