= Sumy Oblast =

Oblast (region) of Ukraine

Coordinates: 51°00′N 34°00′E

Sumy Oblast Сумська область
- Oblast
- Sumska oblast
- Flag Coat of arms
- Nickname: Сумщина (Sumshchyna)
- Interactive map of Sumy Oblast in Ukraine
- Country: Ukraine
- Administrative center: Sumy

Government
  - Governor: Oleh Hryhorov
  - Oblast council: 64 seats
  - Chairperson: Oleksiy Romanko

Area
  - Total: 23,834 km^{2} (9,202 sq mi)
  - Rank: Ranked 16th

Population (2022)
  - Total: 1,035,772 ▼
  - Rank: Ranked 19th
  - Density: 43.458/km^{2} (112.56/sq mi)

GDP
  - Total: ₴ 105 billion (€2.7 billion)
  - Per capita: ₴ 100,760 (€2,600)
- Time zone: UTC+2 (EET)
  - Summer (DST): UTC+3 (EEST)
- Postal code: 40000-41999
- Area code: +380-54
- ISO 3166 code: UA-59
- Raions: 18
- Cities: 15
- Settlements: 20
- Villages: 1492
- HDI (2022): 0.737 high
- FIPS 10-4: UP21
- NUTS statistical regions of Ukraine: UA12
- Website: sorada.gov.ua

Sumy Oblast (Ukrainian: Сумська область, romanized: Sumska oblast), also known as Sumshchyna (Сумщина), is an oblast (province) in northeast Ukraine. The oblast was created in its modern-day form, from the merging of raions from Kharkiv Oblast, Chernihiv Oblast, and Poltava Oblast in 1939 by the Presidium of the Supreme Soviet of the Soviet Union. The estimated population is 1,035,772 (2022 estimate).

The administrative center of the oblast is the city of Sumy. Other important cities within the oblast include Konotop, Okhtyrka, Romny, and Shostka. The modern region combines territories of the historical Severia (northern part) and Sloboda Ukraine (southern part). On territory of the Sumy Oblast important centers of Ukrainian culture are located, such as the city of Hlukhiv which served as a hetman residence during the Cossack Hetmanate as well as the cities of Okhtyrka and Sumy which were regional centers of the Sloboda Ukraine.

The oblast has a heavy mix of agriculture and industry, with over 600 industrial locations. Among the most notable was the Soviet film stock manufacturer Svema in Shostka. Importantly, seven rivers pass through the oblast.

== Geography ==
The Sumy Oblast is situated in the northeastern part of Ukraine. In Ukraine it borders Chernihiv Oblast to its west, Poltava Oblast to the south, and Kharkiv Oblast to the southeast. Sumy Oblast also borders the Russian Federation, including Bryansk in the north, Kursk to the northeast, and Belgorod to the east. The length of the state border with the Russian Federation is 563.8 km (350.3 mi). There are three railway border crossing (Volfine, Pushkarne, Zernove) and five highway border crossings (Bachivsk, Katerynivka, Ryzhivka, Yunakivka, Velyka Pysarivka). In regard to border crossings, since 2006 the city of Sumy has an airport which has an international checkpoint.

On its territory the Dnieper Lowland transitions east to the Central Russian Upland. The northern part of Sumy Oblast is part of the Polesie Lowland as its eastern region. The elevation of Sumy Oblast is between 110–240 m above sea level. Its area (23,800 km^{2}) constitutes 3.95% of the country.

Seven main rivers flow through the oblast, with Desna River being the largest. All of them are transit because crossing the oblast flowing from the territory of the Russian Federation west towards Dnieper. All rivers in Sumy Oblast are part of the Dnieper River basin.

The Sumy Oblast contains 168 objects and territories of natural reserve. The oblast is rich in picturesque banks of numerous rivers, and sources of mineral waters. Major environmental problems are: soil erosion, pesticide pollution, air and water pollution. The city has a problem of garbage utilization.

== History ==
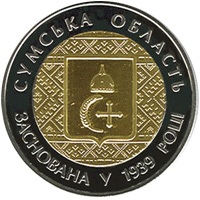
NBU commemorative coin dedicated to Sumy region

The region was created on the ukase of Presidium of the Supreme Soviet of the Soviet Union on 10 January 1939 as part of the Ukrainian Soviet Socialist Republic. The newly created Sumy Oblast included 12 former raions of Kharkiv Oblast, 17 former raions of Chernihiv Oblast, and 2 former raions of Poltava Oblast.

During World War II in 1941–43, it was occupied by Nazi Germany under administration of the German Wehrmacht. After the German forces were driven out, the Soviet Union regained control of the region under jurisdiction of the Ukrainian Soviet Socialist Republic.

In 1965 one of former Chernihiv Oblast raions (Talalaivka Raion) was returned to Chernihiv Oblast.

During the 2022 Russian invasion of Ukraine the Sumy Oblast was one of the first regions where Russian and Ukrainian forces clashed. Parts of the oblast came under Russian occupation during the invasion. On 4 April 2022 Governor of Sumy Oblast Dmytro Zhyvytskyi stated that Russian troops no longer occupied any towns or villages in Sumy Oblast and had mostly withdrawn, while Ukrainian troops were working to push out the remaining units. On 8 April 2022 Zhyvytskyi stated that all Russian troops had left Sumy Oblast.

On 9 June 2024, amid Russian cross-border operations in neighboring Kharkiv Oblast, Russian forces claimed to have attacked and captured the border village of Ryzhivka, though this was denied by Ukrainian authorities.

Since the collapse of Ukraine's incursion into Kursk in early 2025, Russian forces have slowly reoccupied territories in northeastern Sumy Oblast. Several border settlements were captured, including Novenske, Basivka, and Veselivka. As of February 2026, combat continues in several settlements near the border, including Yunakivka and Kindrativka.

== Demographics ==
According to the 2001 Ukrainian census, ethnic Ukrainians accounted for 88.8% of the population of Sumy Oblast, and ethnic Russians for 9.4%.

=== Language ===
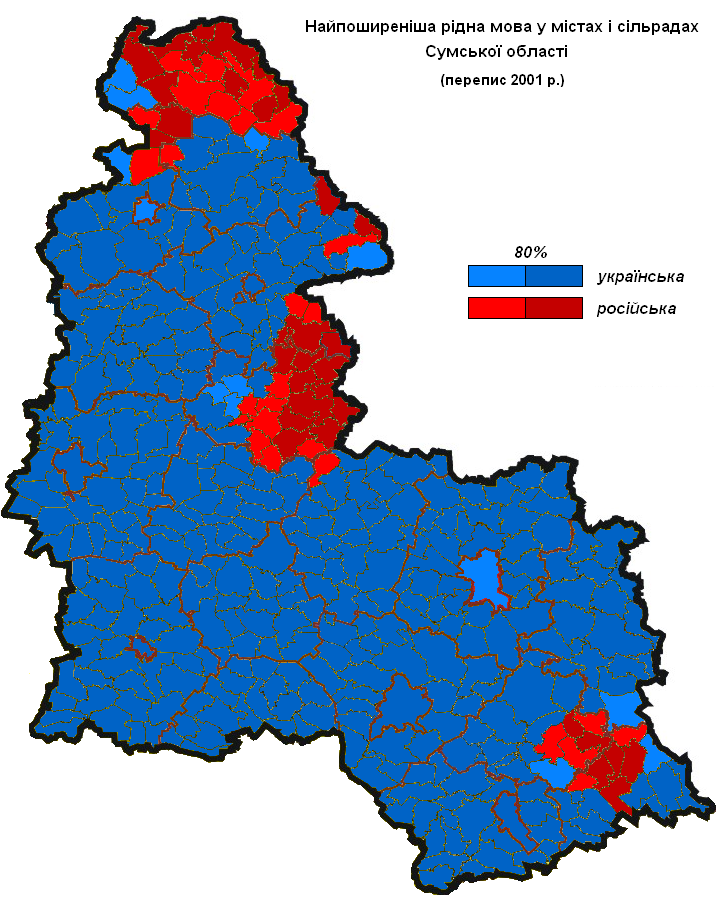
According to the 2001 Ukrainian census, Ukrainian was the native language for over 83% of Sumy Oblast's population: it was the dominant language in the absolute majority of the city, town, and village councils of the oblast. Russian was dominant in several differently-sized zones near the border with Russia. Approximately 40% of the predominantly Russian-speaking local councils had a significant Ukrainian-speaking minority, which accounted for over 20% of the local population.

Due to the Russification of Ukraine during the Soviet era, the share of Ukrainian speakers in the population of Sumy Oblast gradually decreased, while the share of Russian speakers increased. Native language of the population of Sumy Oblast according to the results of population censuses:

	1959	1970	1989	2001
Ukrainian	82.0%	80.7%	78.1%	83.3%
Russian	17.6%	18.9%	21.4%	15.5%
Other	0.4%	0.4%	0.5%	0.4%

Native language of the population of the raions, cities, and city councils of Sumy Oblast according to the 2001 Ukrainian census:

	Ukrainian	Russian
Sumy Oblast	83.3%	15.5%
Sumy (city council)	77.4%	20.2%
Okhtyrka (city council)	87.1%	10.0%
Hlukhiv (city council)	83.3%	16.4%
Konotop (city council)	86.4%	13.0%
Lebedyn (city council)	93.3%	6.5%
Romny (city council)	94.0%	5.7%
City of Shostka	60.8%	35.7%
Okhtyrka Raion (in pre-2020 borders)	96.2%	3.3%
Bilopillia Raion	93.8%	5.4%
Buryn Raion	96.9%	2.5%
Velyka Pysarivka Raion	72.6%	27.0%
Hlukhiv Raion	78.1%	21.7%
Konotop Raion (in pre-2020 borders)	97.4%	2.2%
Krasnopillia Raion	93.0%	6.5%
Krolevets Raion	95.8%	3.8%
Lebedyn Raion	96.1%	3.5%
Lypova Dolyna Raion	97.7%	1.9%
Nedryhailiv Raion	97.7%	1.9%
Putyvl Raion	38.7%	61.0%
Romny Raion (in pre-2020 borders)	97.6%	2.0%
Seredyna-Buda Raion	20.8%	79.1%
Sumy Raion (in pre-2020 borders)	93.8%	5.5%
Trostianets Raion	86.1%	13.3%
Shostka Raion (in pre-2020 borders)	86.5%	12.9%
Yampil Raion	82.5%	16.9%

Ukrainian is the only official language on the whole territory of Sumy Oblast.

According to a poll conducted by Rating from 16 November to 10 December 2018 as part of the project «Portraits of Regions», 60% of the residents of Sumy Oblast believed that the Ukrainian language should be the only state language on the entire territory of Ukraine. 22% believed that Ukrainian should be the only state language, while Russian should be the second official language in some regions of the country. 10% believed that Russian should become the second state language of the country. 8% found it difficult to answer.

On 26 April 2023, Sumy Oblast Military Administration approved the «Programme for the Development of the Ukrainian Language in All Spheres of Public Life in Sumy Oblast for 2023—2027», the main objective of which is to strengthen the positions of the Ukrainian language in various spheres of public life in the oblast.

According to the research of the Content Analysis Centre, conducted from 15 August to 15 September 2024, the topic of which was the ratio of Ukrainian and Russian languages in the Ukrainian segment of social media, 75.0% of posts from Sumy Oblast were written in Ukrainian (72.5% in 2023, 55.9% in 2022, 19.4% in 2020), while 25.0% were written in Russian (27.5% in 2023, 44.1% in 2022, 80.6% in 2020).

After Ukraine declared independence in 1991, Sumy Oblast, as well as Ukraine as a whole, experienced a gradual Ukrainization of the education system, which had been Russified during the Soviet era. Dynamics of the ratio of the languages of instruction in general secondary education institutions in Sumy Oblast:

Language of instruction, % of pupils	1991— 1992	1992— 1993	1993— 1994	1994— 1995	1995— 1996	2000— 2001	2005— 2006	2007— 2008	2010— 2011	2012— 2013	2015— 2016	2018— 2019	2021— 2022	2022— 2023
Ukrainian	48.5%	49.0%	55.8%	59.7%	63.0%	83.0%	93.0%	95.0%	96.0%	96.0%	96.0%	98.0%	99.88%	100.0%
Russian	51.5%	51.0%	44.2%	40.3%	37.0%	17.0%	7.0%	5.0%	4.0%	4.0%	4.0%	2.0%	0.12%	—

According to the State Statistics Service of Ukraine, in the 2023—2024 school year, all 91,513 pupils in general secondary education institutions in Sumy Oblast were studying in classes where Ukrainian was the language of instruction.

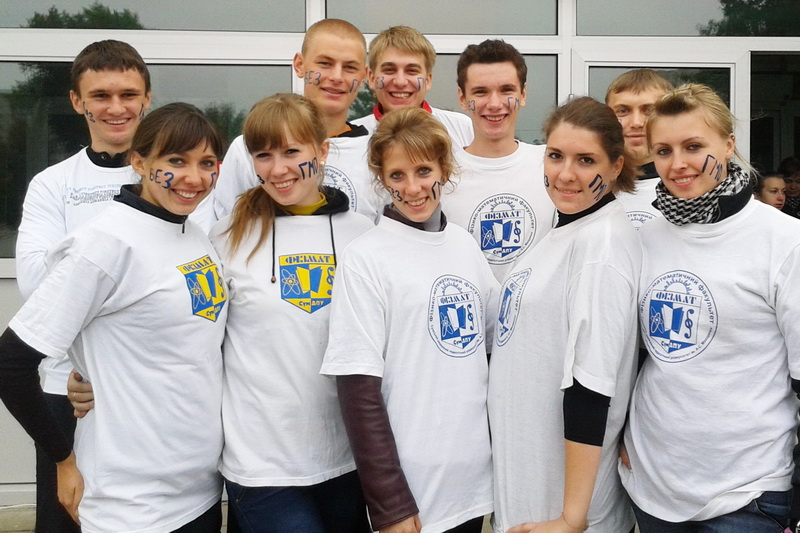
Students of the Sumy Oblast Pedagogical University

=== Age structure ===
0-14 years: 12.7% ▲ (male 74,529/female 70,521)
15-64 years: 70.8% ▼ (male 386,250/female 422,077)
65 years and over: 16.5% (male 60,374/female 127,306) (2013 official)

=== Median age ===
total: 42.0 years ▲
male: 38.6 years ▲
female: 45.4 years ▲ (2013 official)

== Points of interest ==
The following historic-cultural sited were nominated for the Seven Wonders of Ukraine.

- Monument to a Mammoth (Kulishivka)
- Kruhlyi dvir (Round court)
- Sofroniiv Monastery

== Administrative divisions ==
It comprises 5 raions (districts) that are further subdivided into 51 territorial hromadas (communities).

The following data incorporates the number of each type of administrative divisions of the Sumy Oblast:

- Administrative Center – 1 (Sumy);
- Raions – 5;
- Hromadas – 51.

The local administration of the oblast is controlled by the Sumy Oblast council. The governor of the oblast (chairman of state regional administration) is appointed by the President of Ukraine.

=== Districts ===
Name	Coat of arms	Administrative center	Population (thousands)	On the map	Admin. structure
Konotopsky		Konotop	204.2		Admin. structure
Okhtyrsky		Okhtyrka	125.6		Admin. structure
Romensky		Romny	113.7		Admin. structure
Sumsky		Sumy	449.4		Admin. structure
Shostkinsky		Shostka	188.5		Admin. structure

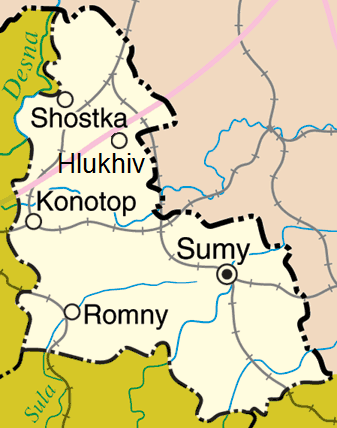
Detailed map of Sumy Oblast

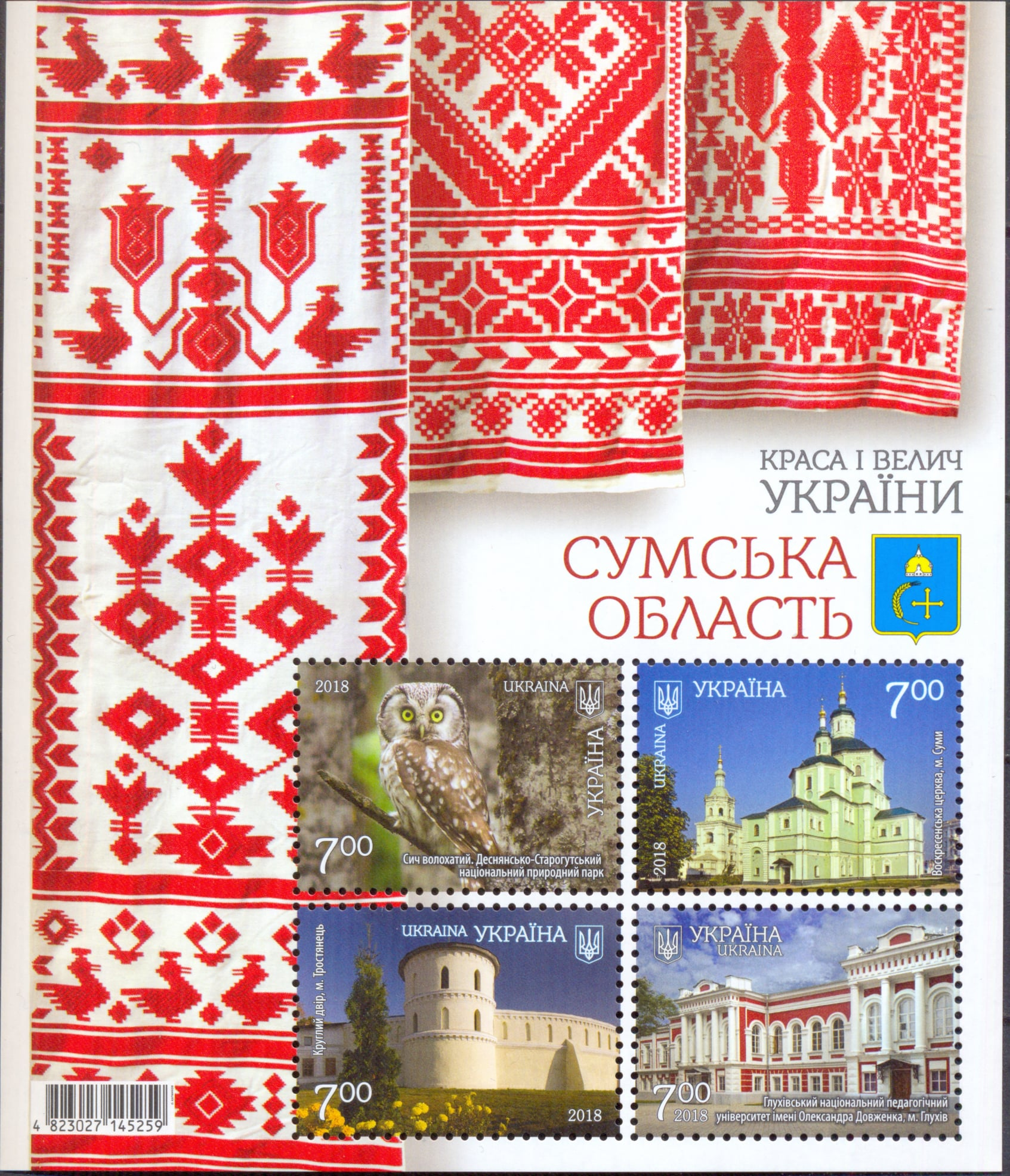
Block of 4 stamps "Beauty and greatness of Ukraine. Sumy region" (2018)

=== Districts in cities ===
No.	District	Entry
1	Zarichy	city Sumy
2	Kovpakiv	city Sumy

=== Liquidated districts ===
More: Administrative divisions of Sumy Oblast

== Economy ==
=== Industry ===
The main industrial activities of the oblast are: chemical mechanical engineering, pumping and energy mechanical engineering, agricultural machine-construction, instrument-making industry and radio electronics, technical equipment production for processing fields of agro-industrial complexes, mining and iron ore production industry, polygraph industry and medicine production, oil and gas processing, chemical production, film and photo material production (See: Svema), and chemical fertilizer production. In general, there are 273 large industry enterprises and 327 small industry enterprises.

=== Agriculture ===
In 1999, the gross grain yield was about 446,000 tons, sugar beets – 664,000 tons, sunflower seeds – 27,700 tons, potatoes – 343,600 tons. The region also produced 108,700 tons of meat, 517,800 tons of milk and 295,300,000 eggs. At the beginning of 1999, there were 781 registered farms in the oblast.

== Notable people from Sumy Oblast ==
- Viktor Yushchenko – 3rd President of Ukraine (2005–2010); Khoruzhivka village
- Yevhen Adamtsevych – Ukrainian bandurist, the author of Zaporizhian March
- Ivan Bahrianyi – Ukrainian poet and a political leader in exile; Okhtyrka
- Oleksi Berest – one of the soldiers who hoisted the Victory Banner in Berlin and a posthumous Hero of Ukraine.
- Dmitry Bortniansky – Ukrainian composer; Hlukhiv
- Dmitry Chechulin – chief architect of Moscow; born in Shostka in 1901
- Thomas de Hartmann – composer
- Volodymyr Holubnychy – race walker, Olympic gold medal; Sumy
- Abram Ioffe – academician, "father of the Soviet physics"; Romny
- Ivan Nikitovich Kozhedub – WWII ace and air marshal of the Soviet Union.
- Panteleimon Kulish – Ukrainian writer, author of Ukrainian alphabet variation; Voronizh
- Vladimir Kuts – long-distance runner, Olympic gold medal; Trostianets Raion
- Mykola Khvylovy – poet, one of the most recognized members of the so-called Executed Renaissance
- Ada Rohovtseva – stage actress of theater and cinema, People's Actor of Ukraine, USSR People's Actor, Hero of Ukraine
- Andrey Razumovsky – son of Kyrylo Rozumovsky, Active Privy Councillor, 1st class
- Natalia Ivanovna Sedova – wife of Leon Trotsky, born in Romny in 1882
- Stephen Timoshenko – considered as "America's father of engineering mechanics" (1878–1972)
- Leonid Toptunov – senior reactor control chief engineer at the Chernobyl Nuclear Power Plant Reactor Unit 4 on the night of the Chernobyl disaster
- Vladimir Sakhenko – painter and ceramist

== Nomenclature ==
Most of Ukraine's oblasts are named after their capital cities, officially referred to as "oblast centers" (Ukrainian: обласний центр, translit. oblasnyi tsentr). The name of each oblast is a relative adjective, formed by adding a feminine suffix to the name of respective center city: Sumy is the center of the Sums’ka oblast (Sumy Oblast). Most oblasts are also sometimes referred to in a feminine noun form, following the convention of traditional regional place names, ending with the suffix "-shchyna", as is the case with the Sumy Oblast, Sumshchyna.

== Gallery ==
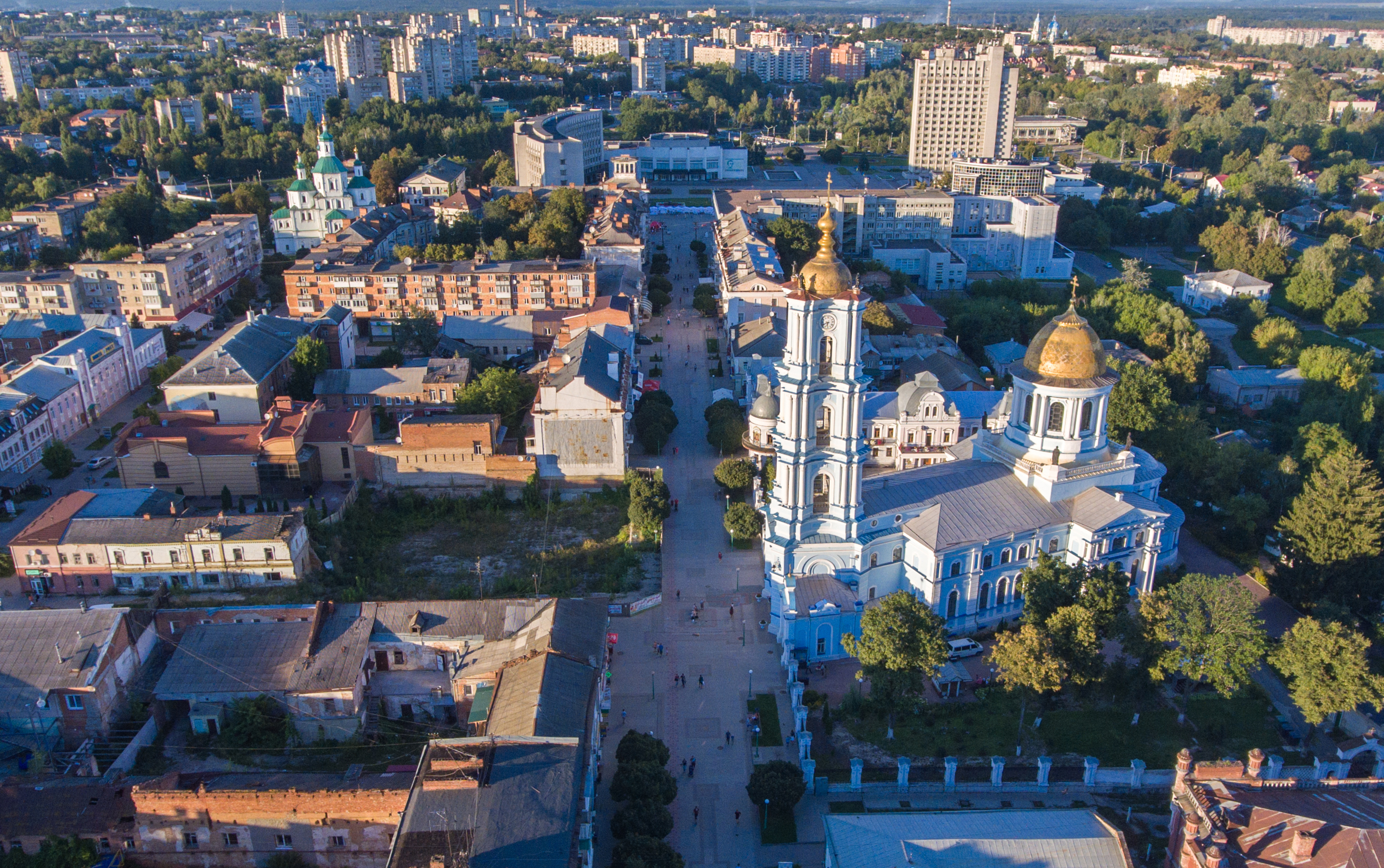
Skyline of Sumy

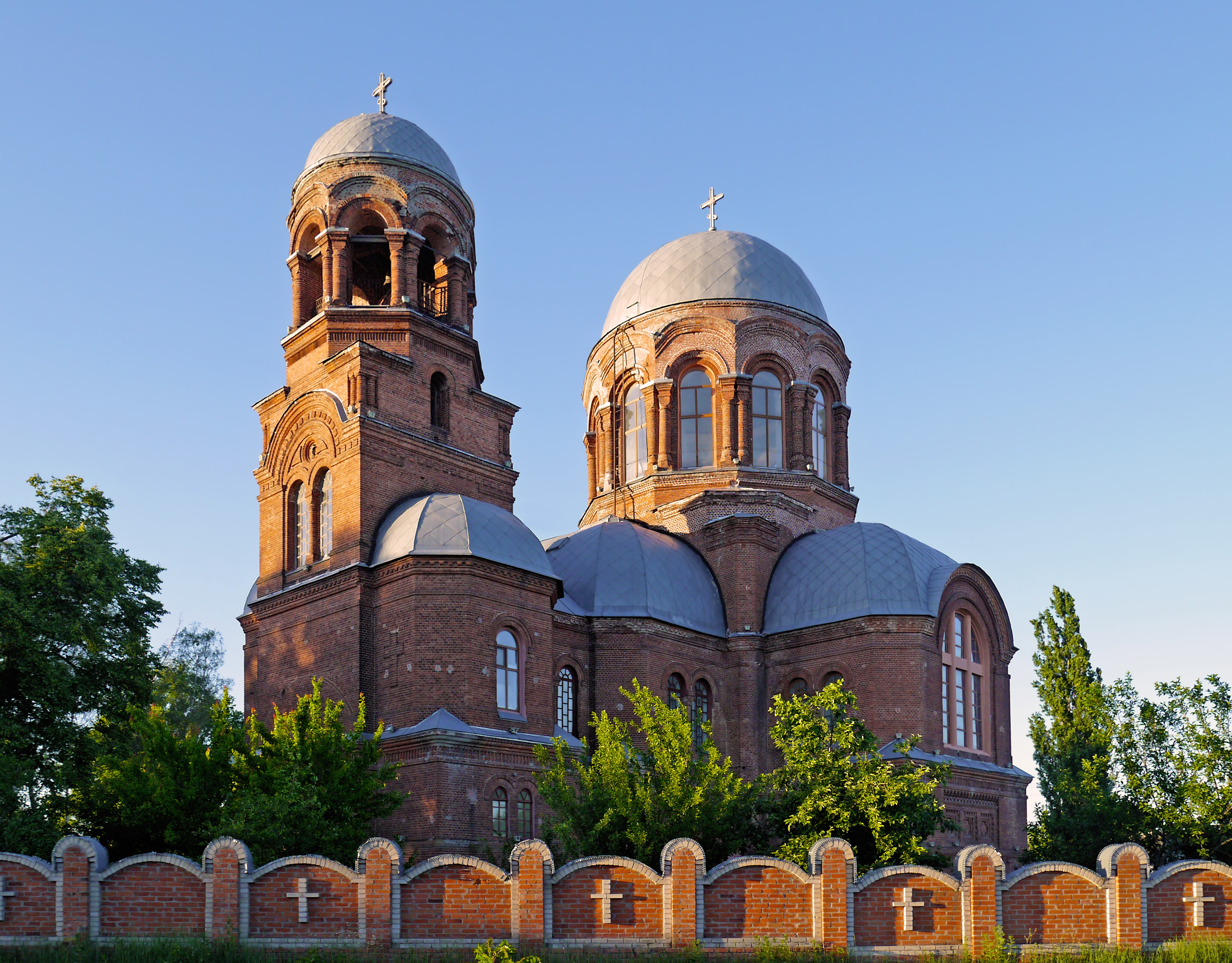
St. George's Church in Okhtyrka

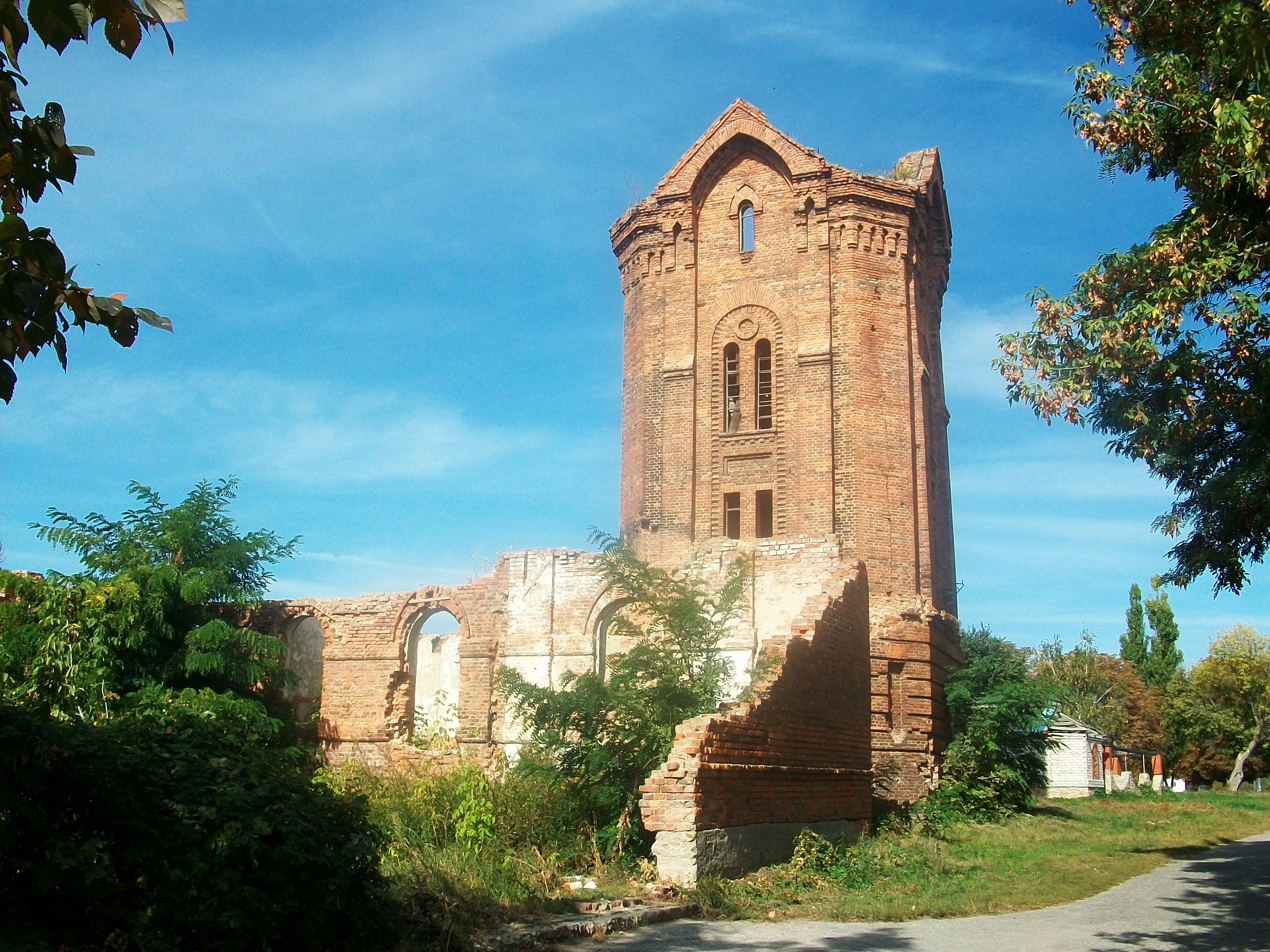
Putyvl Fortress

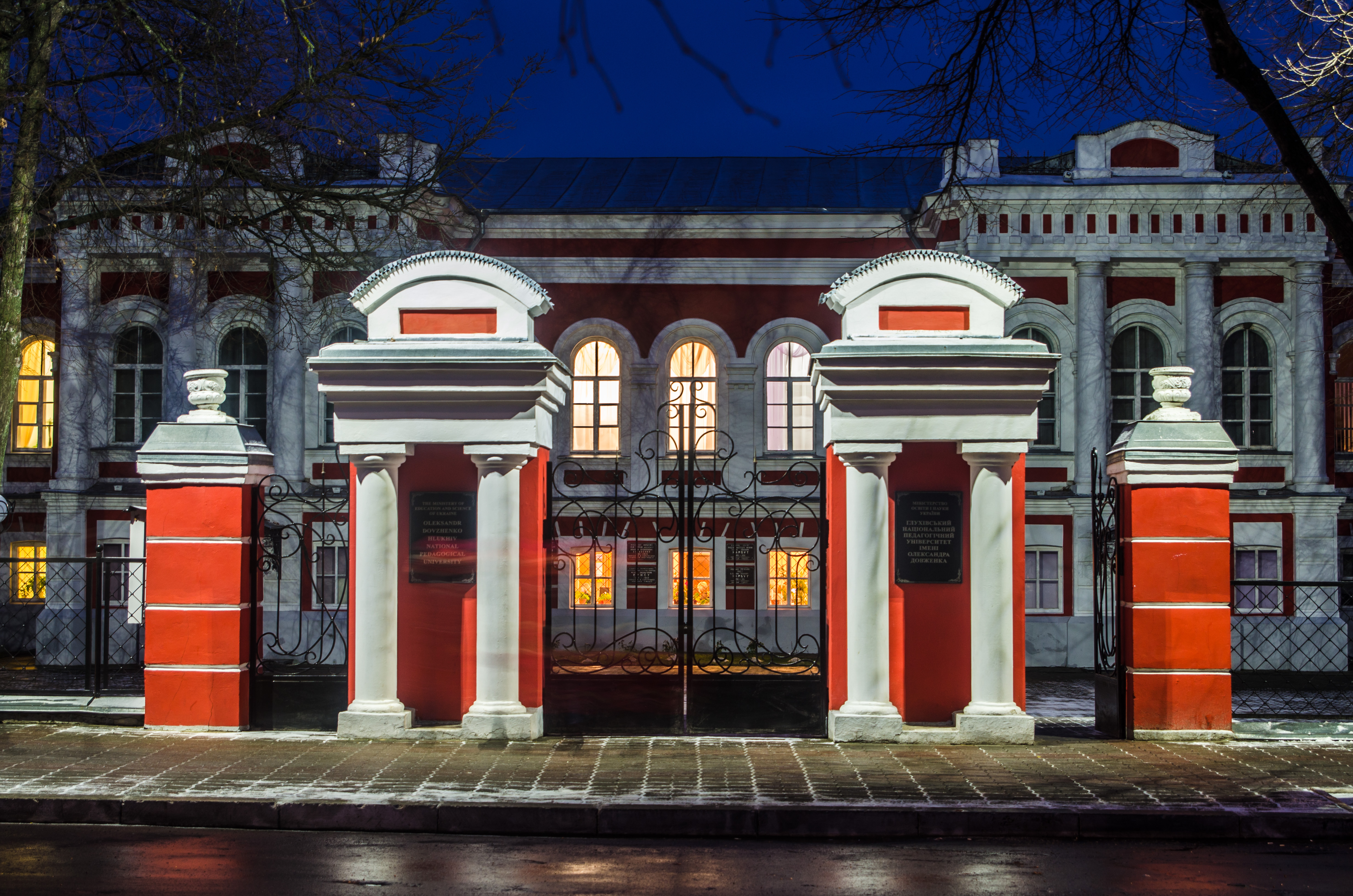
Hlukhiv National Pedagogical University

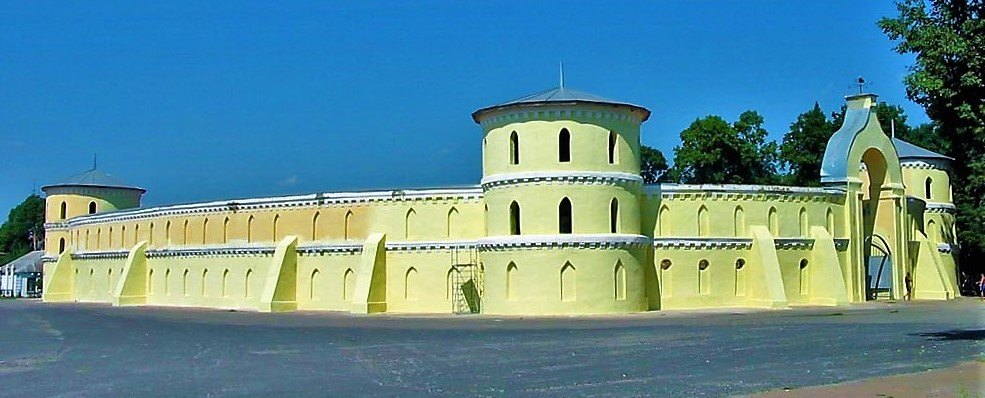
Kruhlyi Dvir in Trostianets

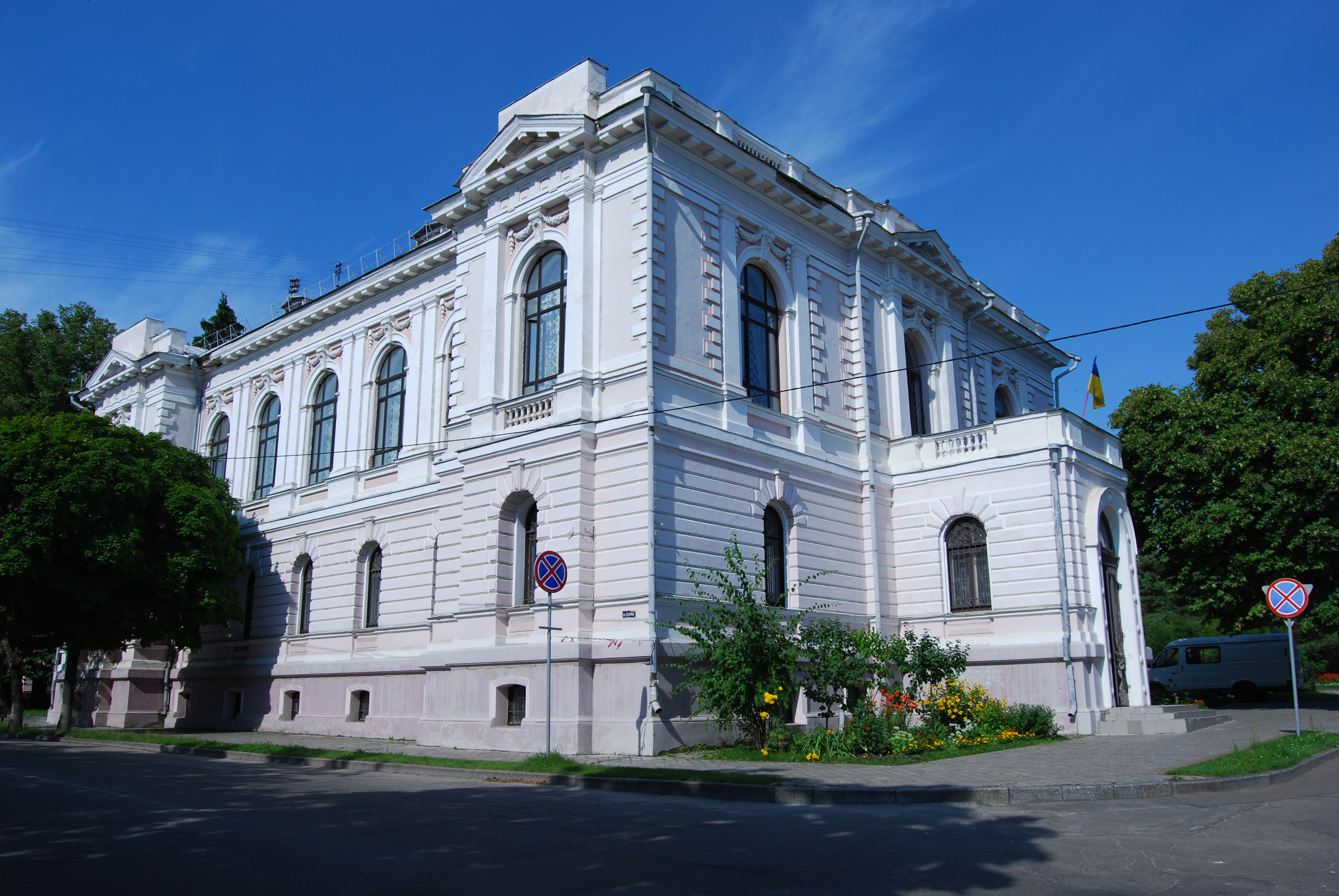
Nikanor Onatsky Art Museum

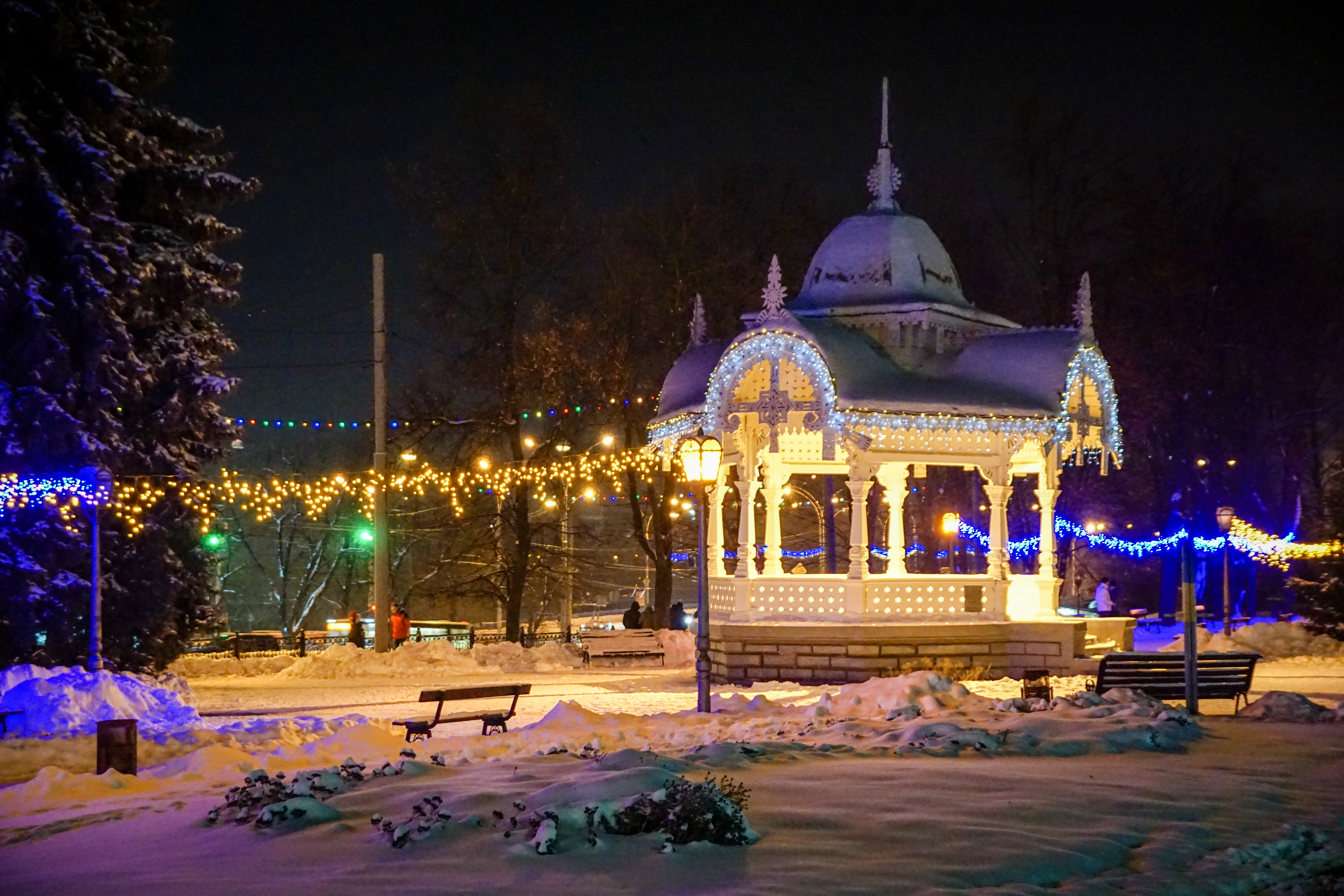
Pokrovska Square in Sumy

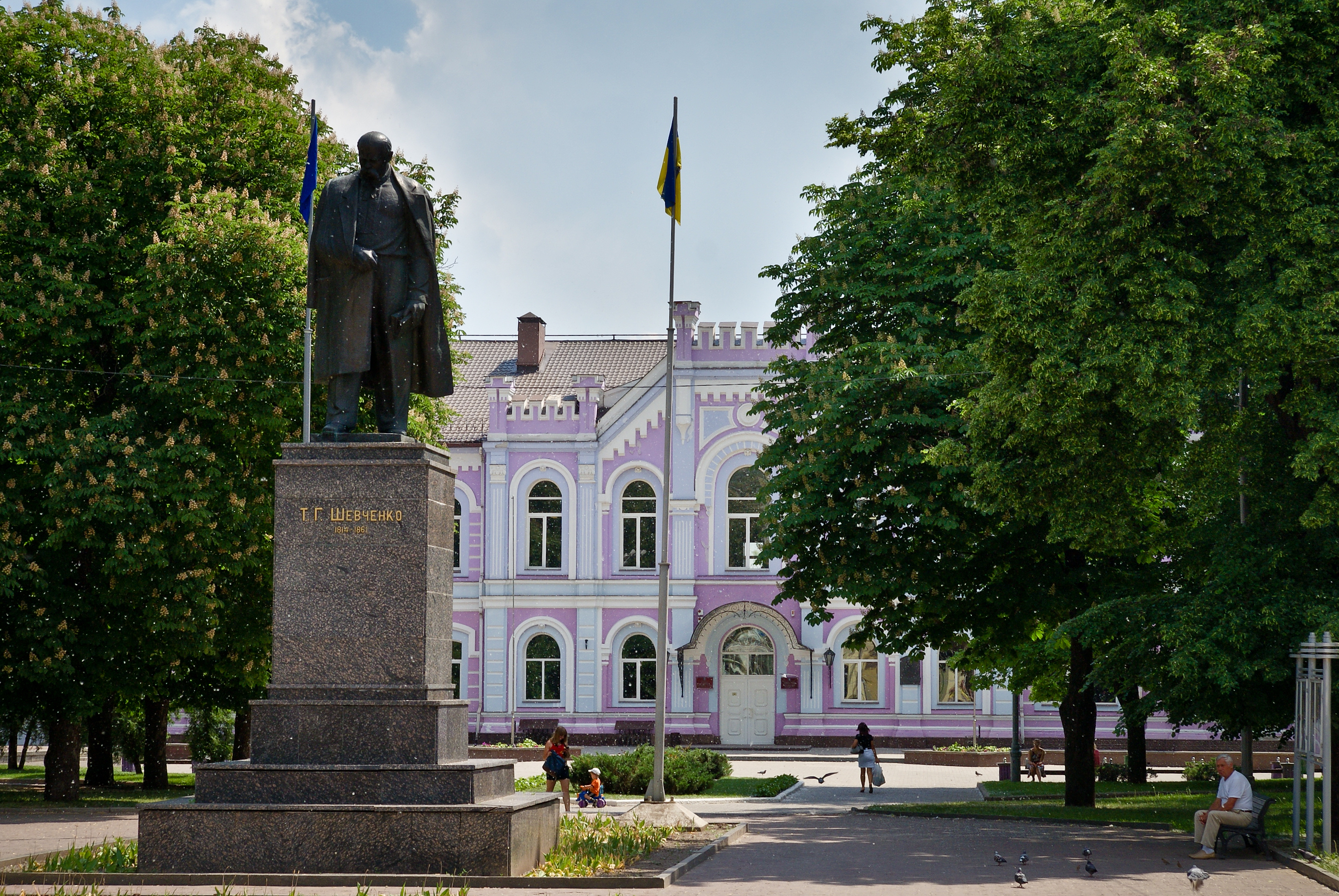
Monument to Taras Shevchenko

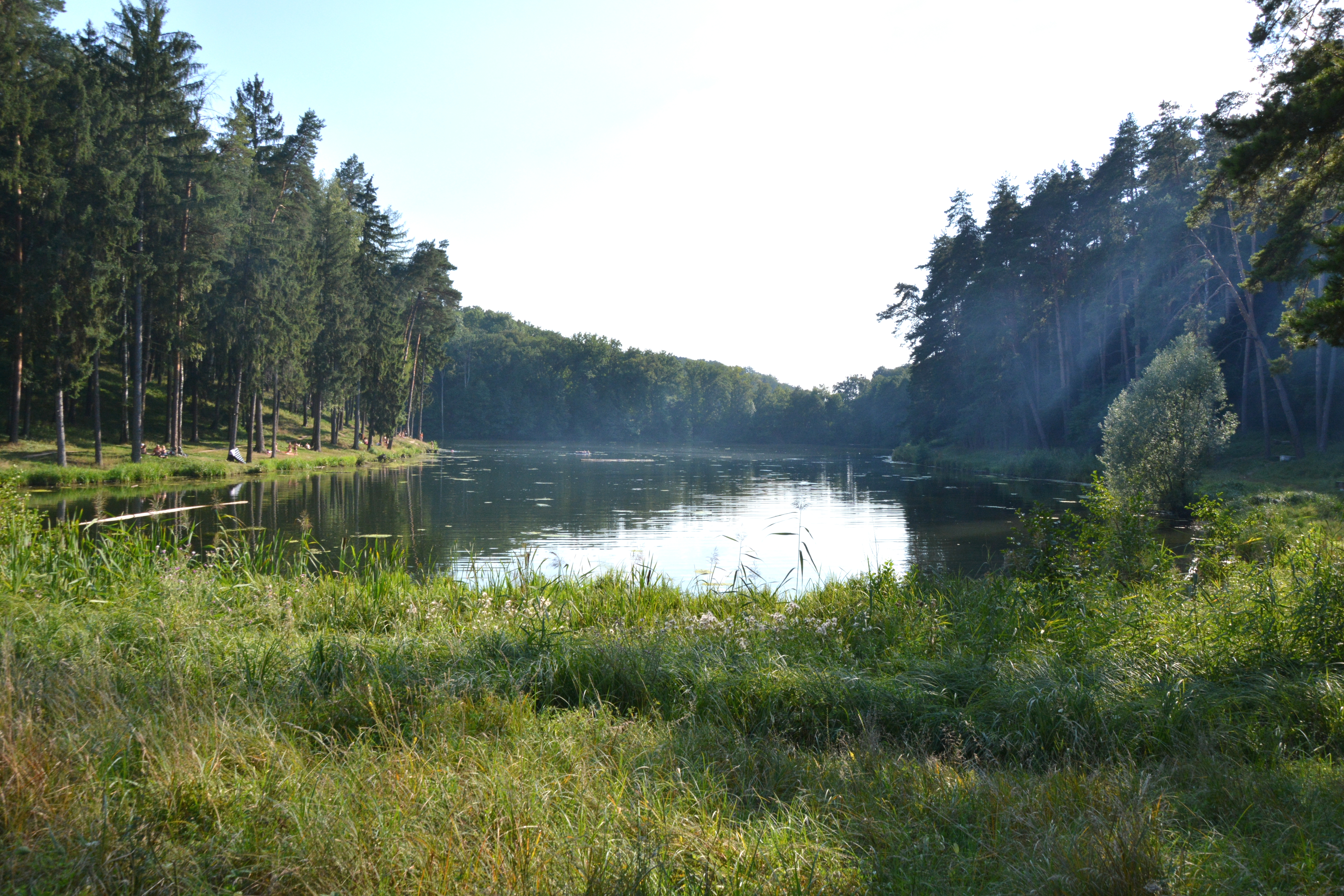
Trostianets Park

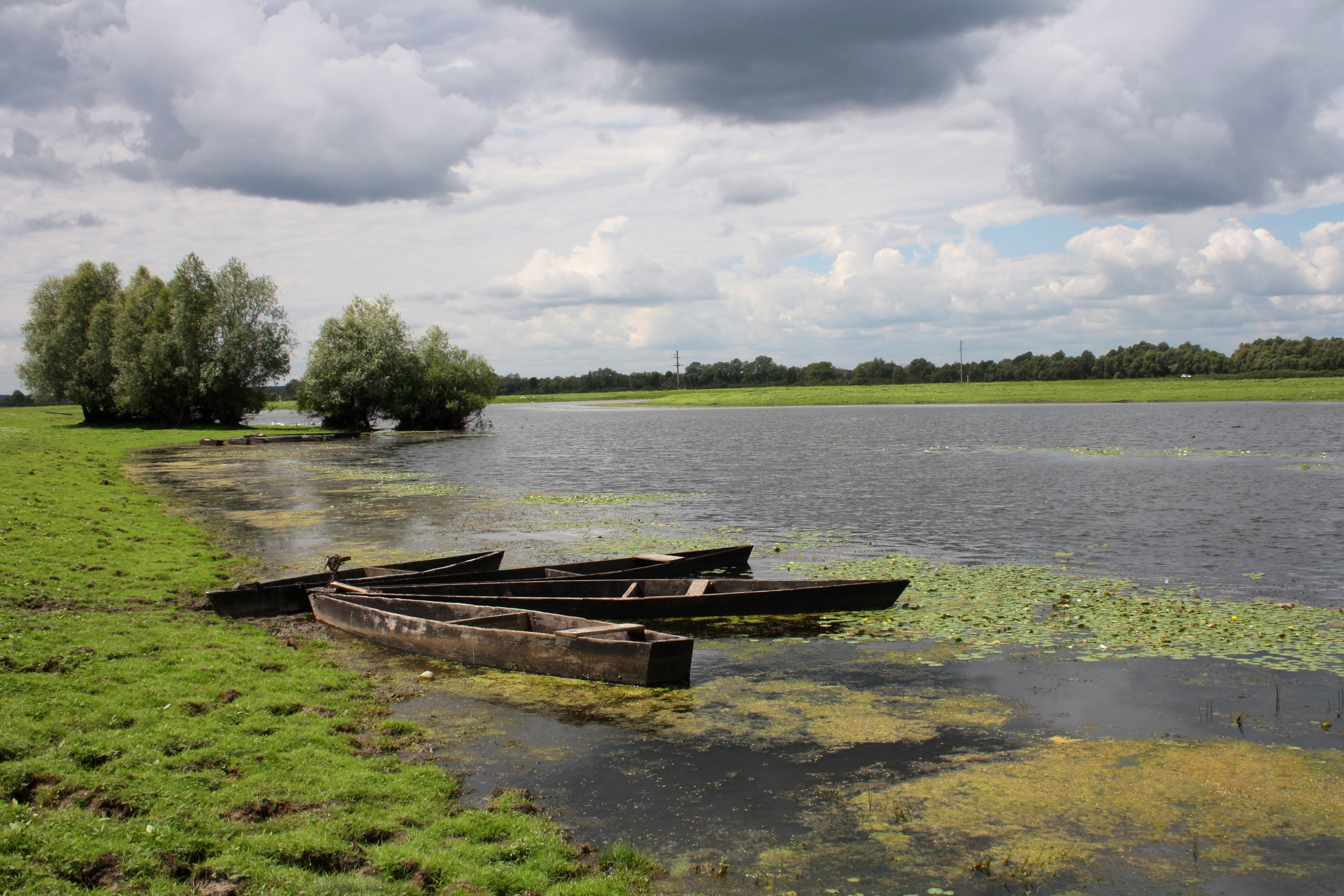
Desna-Stara Huta National Nature Park

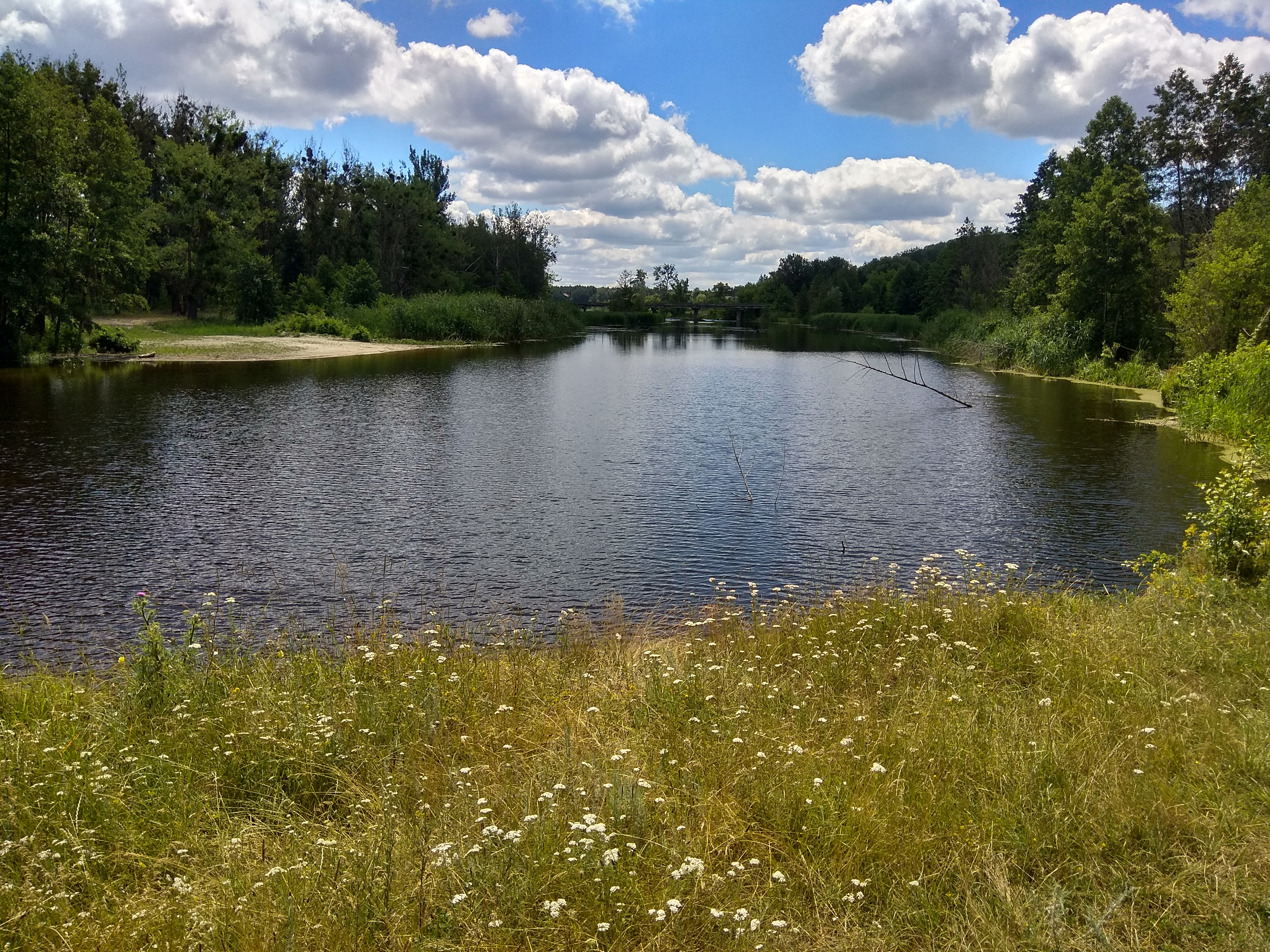
Hetman National Nature Park

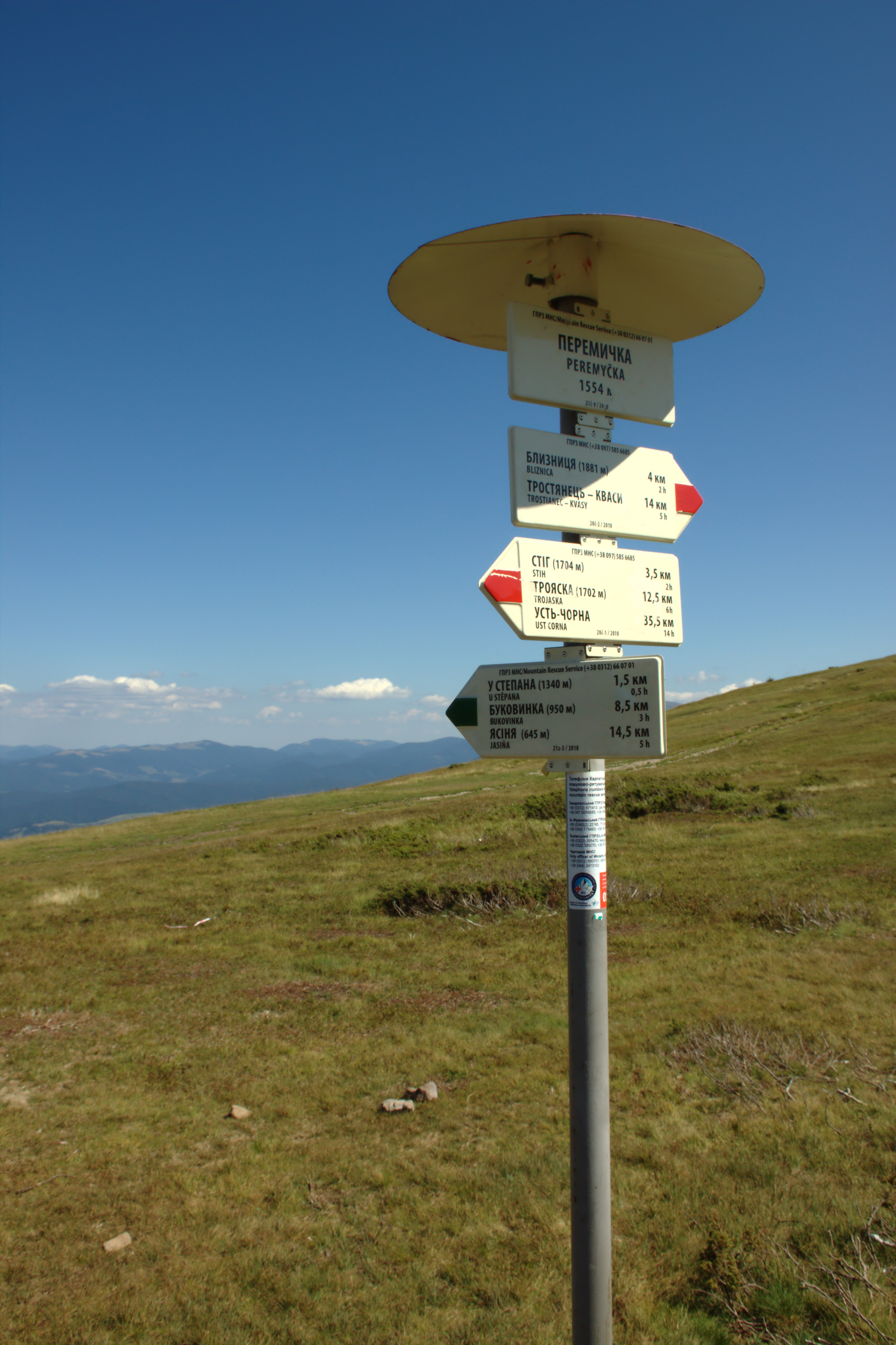
Czech transliteration of Ukrainian

== See also ==
- Subdivisions of Ukraine
- Russian occupation of Sumy Oblast
