= Pyotr Braiko =

Soviet Ukrainian partisan (1919–2018)

Pyotr Yevseevich Braiko
- Пётр Евсеевич Брайко
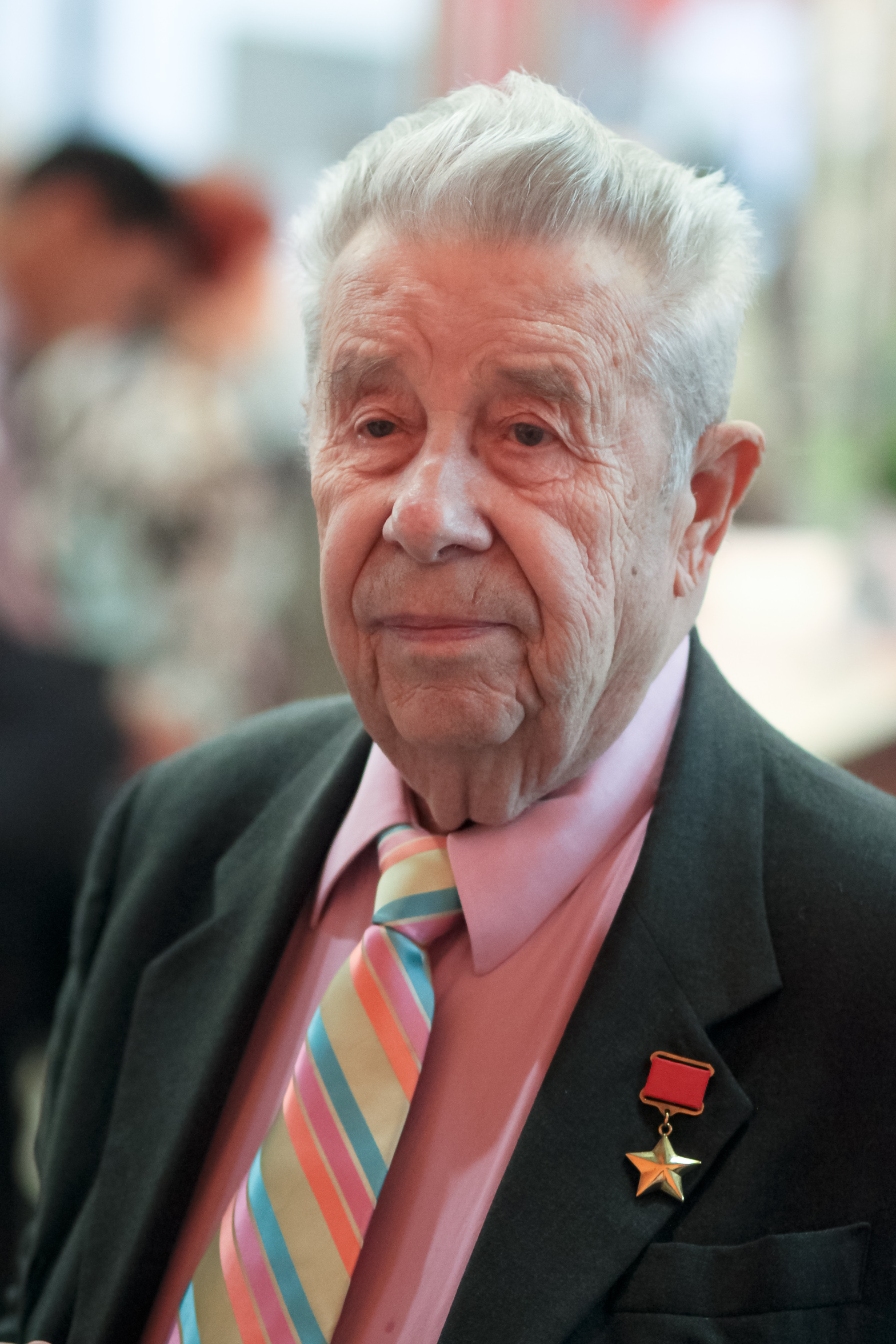
- Braiko in 2011
- Born: 9 September 1919
- Died: 7 April 2018 (aged 98)
- Military career
- Allegiance: Soviet Union
- Branch: Red Army
- Service years: 1938–1960
- Rank: Colonel
- Conflicts: World War II
- Awards: Hero of the Soviet Union

Pyotr Yevseevich Braiko (Russian: Пётр Евсеевич Брайко; 9 September 1919 – 7 April 2018) was a Soviet soldier during the Second World War who gained the status of Hero of the Soviet Union following the conflict.

He took part in seven raids by the guerrilla brigade of Sydir Kovpak. Though he did not achieve his dream of a career as a military pilot, he graduated from the Moscow Border Communication College. He entered action on 22 June 1941 as a Soviet border guard on the border with Romania and witnessed the tragic encirclement and routing of Soviet forces near Kiev. He would come to spend years deep behind enemy lines where he took guidance from Soviet guerrilla leaders in Ukraine including Sydir Kovpak, Semyon Rudnev and Pyotr Vershigora.

== See also ==
- Soviet Partisans
