= Natan Strugatsky =

Soviet art historian (1892–1942)

- Born: Nota Zalmanovich Strugatsky; 26 May 1892; Dubovychi, Chernigov Governorate, Russian Empire
- Died: 7 February 1942 (aged 49); Vologda, Russian SFSR, Soviet Union
- Occupations: Art historian; bibliographer; iconographer
- Spouse: Alexandra Ivanovna Litvincheva (1901–1979)
- Children: Arkady Strugatsky; Boris Strugatsky

Natan (Nota) Zalmanovich Strugatsky (Russian: Ната́н (Но́та) За́лманович Струга́цкий; 26 May 1892 – 7 February 1942) was a Soviet art historian, bibliographer, and iconographer. He was the father of the writers Arkady and Boris Strugatsky, known collectively as the Strugatsky brothers.

Born into a prosperous Jewish family, he did not complete his legal education and was involved in the revolutionary movement. He joined the Bolshevik Party in March 1917 and served in informational and organizational structures of the workers' and peasants' councils. During the Russian Civil War, he was a political commissar in the Red Army. In the 1920s and 1930s, he was primarily associated with educational, publishing, and art institutions, completing postgraduate studies at the Communist Academy. His family resided permanently in Leningrad after 1927. From 1937 to 1941, he worked at the Saltykov-Shchedrin Public Library in Leningrad, including as chief librarian and head of the prints department, publishing works on Soviet graphics, posters, and illustrations for literary classics. From October to December 1941, he served as a volunteer in the army during the Siege of Leningrad, but was discharged due to illness. In 1942, he was tasked with accompanying the evacuated collections of the Public Library to Melekess, departing on 29 January by train with his son Arkady (his wife and younger son Boris remained in the besieged city). He died of starvation and heart disease on 7 February in Vologda, recorded in the lists of the deceased with significant errors in his name and surname. The circumstances his death and his burial place were only documented in the 2000s.

== Origin and early years (1892–1917) ==
Natan Strugatsky was born on 14 May 1892 in the shtetl of Dubovychi, Glukhovsky Uyezd (now a village in Konotop Raion, Sumy Oblast, Ukraine). He was the eldest of four sons in the family of a private attorney, an agent of the Salamandra insurance company, and a Sosnitsa burgher, Zalman Leibovich Strugatsky (1864–before 1937) and Genya (Evgenia) Aronovna Gorelik (1875–1942). (Note: In the 1906 census, the mother's name is listed as Genya (30 years old); the father's age is 41 years (JewishGen.org).) His grandfather, Sosnitsa burgher Leib Zalmanovich Strugatsky, owned a house from 1876 and lived with his family in the shtetl of Sukhodol, Glukhovsky Uyezd. (Note: In the revision lists of 1878, Leib Zalmanovich Strugatsky, aged 40, a merchant, is noted as owning a house on Prikhodko's land since 1876, where he lived with his wife Sofia Aronovna Strugatsky, 38, sons Nota (16), Zalman (14), Yankel (9), Nokhim (7), Shmul (3), and one-year-old daughter Khaika (JewishGen.org).) Natan had younger brothers: Aron (born 1895), Isaac (born 1900), and Alexander (born 1905). From 1906, the family lived in the shtetl of Romashkovo, Novgorod-Seversky Uyezd. (Note: Family composition according to the 1906 census (JewishGen.org): Zalman Leibovich Strugatsky (41, head of family), wife Genya (30), sons Nota (13), Aron (10), Isaac (5). Alexander Zakharovich Strugatsky was born in 1905 in Seredyna-Buda.) In a personnel record dated October 22, 1937, Natan Strugatsky noted that his father had died by then, and his mother was dependent on him.

He studied at a real school and a gymnasium in Sevsk, stating in his autobiography that he struggled to gain admission due to the Jewish quota. In 1915, he enrolled in the Faculty of Law at Saint Petersburg Imperial University, where he studied for two and a half years without completing the course. According to his son, he joined the Bolsheviks in 1916, but documents confirm he became a member in March 1917. In the spring and summer of 1917, Natan Strugatsky actively participated in revolutionary and protest activities: in April, he was beaten during a demonstration against the Russian Provisional Government at the Mariinsky Palace, and on July 5, he was arrested for participating in a rally at Znamenskaya Square.

== Political activity (1917–1928) ==
External image
- Scout Congress of the 2nd Cavalry Division, 1922. Natan Strugatsky in a Budyonny hat, far right in the second row

From February to November 1917, Natan Strugatsky was elected to the Petrograd Soviet of Workers' and Soldiers' Deputies. In 1918, he headed the Department of Public Education (ONO) of the Pskov Governorate Revolutionary Committee (Gubrevkom), served as a rifleman in food propaganda detachments in Malmyzh and Buzuluk, and as a political commissar of a food propaganda detachment in Melitopol. During the Russian Civil War, he served in the Red Army, and in 1920, he was an instructor in the political department and a military investigator for the 2nd Cavalry Army and deputy editor of the army newspaper Krasnaya Lava on the Southern Front. In battles near Rostov-on-Don, his younger brother, cavalry brigade commander Aron Strugatsky (1895–1919), was killed. (Note: On May 27, 1918, the Central Committee sent Sevsk Soviet worker A. Strugatsky to the Vyatka Committee of the RSDRP(b).) In the post-war years, Natan Strugatsky remained an instructor of the political department of the 2nd Cavalry Corps (1922), served as deputy head of the political department, then head of the agitation and propaganda section of the 5th Cavalry Division of the North Caucasus Military District (1922–1923), and assistant head of the political department of the 9th Don Rifle Division (1923–1924). (Note: The complete list of Natan Z. Strugatsky's party and political positions is as follows: Bondarenko & Kurilsky 2008, p. 12–13 March 1917 — employee of the information and reference bureau of the Soviet of Workers' and Soldiers' Deputies — Petrograd. 1917 — employee of the mandate commission of the Soviet of Workers' and Soldiers' Deputies — Petrograd. Late 1917 — early 1918 — manager of the Commissariat of Agitation and Press — Petrograd. 1918 — commissar of public education of the Pskov Revkom — Toroshino station. 1918 — rifleman of a food propaganda detachment — Malmyzh, Vyatka Governorate. 1919 — rifleman of a food propaganda detachment — Buzuluk, Samara Governorate. 1919 — political commissar of a food propaganda detachment — Melitopol, Taurida Governorate. 1920 — deputy editor of the newspaper Krasnaya Lava — Wrangel Front. 1920 — military investigator of the Special Detachment of the 2nd Cavalry Army — Wrangel Front. 1920 — instructor of the political department of the 2nd Cavalry Army — Wrangel Front. 1921 — instructor of the political department of the 2nd Cavalry Corps — Kuban. 1922–1923 — head of the Agitation and Propaganda Section of the 5th Cavalry Division — Mozdok and Stavropol. 1923–1924 — assistant head of the political department of the 9th Don Rifle Division — Nakhichevan. 1925 — executive secretary of the party cell of the House of the Red Army Soviet, North Caucasus Military District — Rostov-on-Don. 1925 — editor of the newspaper Trudovoy Adzharistan — Batumi. 1926–1927 — head of the press subsection of the Vyborg District Committee of the VKP(b) — Leningrad. 1927–1928 — deputy head of the press department of the Vyborg District Committee of the VKP(b) — Leningrad. 1928–1930 — student of the Higher State Courses in Art History [at the Leningrad Institute of Art History] — Leningrad. 1930–1932 — postgraduate student (IKP) at the LIYa LOKA [Section of Literature, Art, and Linguistics of the Leningrad Branch of the Communist Academy at the Institute of Red Professorship] — Leningrad. 1932 — research associate at the Leningrad Institute of History, Philosophy, and Linguistics — Leningrad. 1933–1934 — head of the political department of the Prokopyevsk Grain Sovkhoz — Prokopyevsk, Western Siberia. 1935 — head of the political department of the Zelenovsky Grain Sovkhoz — Frolovsky District. 1936 — head of the Regional Arts Administration under the Regional Executive Committee — Stalingrad.)

In 1924, Natan Strugatsky married Alexandra Ivanovna Litvincheva (1901–1979), the daughter of a prosperous peasant from Seredyna-Buda, where the Strugatsky family also lived for a time, against the wishes of both her and his parents. (Note: Boris Strugatsky reported: "Our grandfather, Ivan Pavlovich, a tough man with rigid convictions, cursed his favorite, youngest Sasha, with the harshest curse. <…> In 1925… in Batumi, Arkady was born. The mother wrote a repentant letter to her father, the grandfather met them sternly, but upon seeing his grandson, he relented and lifted the parental curse." Bondarenko & Kurilsky 2008, p. 7–8 In his personnel record, N. Z. Strugatsky listed his wife's and her parents' surname as "Litvinchova." Vishnevsky 2022, p. 43, Facsimile) She received a pedagogical education. (Note: In 1939, A. I. Strugatskaya completed evening courses at the Herzen State Pedagogical University of Russia and received the official title of a secondary school teacher with the right to teach Russian language and literature in junior and middle grades. Skalandis 2008, p. 28 There is also evidence that she previously graduated from a pedagogical technical school.Amusin 1996, p. 6) She worked as an elementary school teacher. After moving to the northern capital, Alexandra Strugatskaya joined the staff of School No. 6 in the Vyborgsky District, becoming "an outstanding literature teacher known throughout Leningrad". Particularly challenging students were sent to her, and she "pulled them up to a grade of four". After the war, her student was Yuri Senkevich, who in his memoirs described Alexandra Ivanovna as "a true Russian beauty with a braid", who instilled a love for literature in her students: "with her arrival… I began to read a lot and with enthusiasm".

After demobilization, Natan Strugatsky took up party work in Adjara, becoming in 1925 the editor-in-chief of the daily newspaper Trudovoy Adzharistan, founded that year in Batumi as the organ of the Adjara Regional Committee of the Communist Party of Georgia (CPG(b)); the newspaper ceased publication by the end of that year. In the same city, on August 28, the Strugatskys' eldest son was born, named Arkady in honor of his brother who fell in revolutionary battles. (Note: According to Boris Strugatsky, Arkady closely resembled his uncle Aron in his youth.Bondarenko & Kurilsky 2008, p. 7) From 1926 to 1928, Natan Strugatsky served as deputy head of the press department of the Leningrad Oblast Committee (Obkom) of the VKP(b) and head of the press department of the Vyborg District Committee of the VKP(b). The family lived at K. Marx Prospekt, house No. 4, communal apartment No. 16. Alexandra Ivanovna even managed to secure permission to separate, and the Strugatskys had a separate two-room apartment for several years before the war. It was here, on April 15, 1933, seven years, seven months, and eighteen days after Arkady, that the Strugatskys' younger son, named Boris, was born. According to relatives, Natan Zalmanovich Strugatsky was impractical, helpless in everyday matters, and earned little; his wife claimed he aspired to be a writer. His work in censorship and cultural institutions was supplemented by a "book ration" ("any fiction published in Leningrad at the time — for free"), from which a large home library was amassed, occupying two cabinets.

Oh, what wonderful books those were! Dumas, Cervantes, Verhaeren, André Gide, Mérimée, Mac Orlan… Publishers: Academia.edu, Krug, World Library.

== Museum and library work (1928–1942) ==
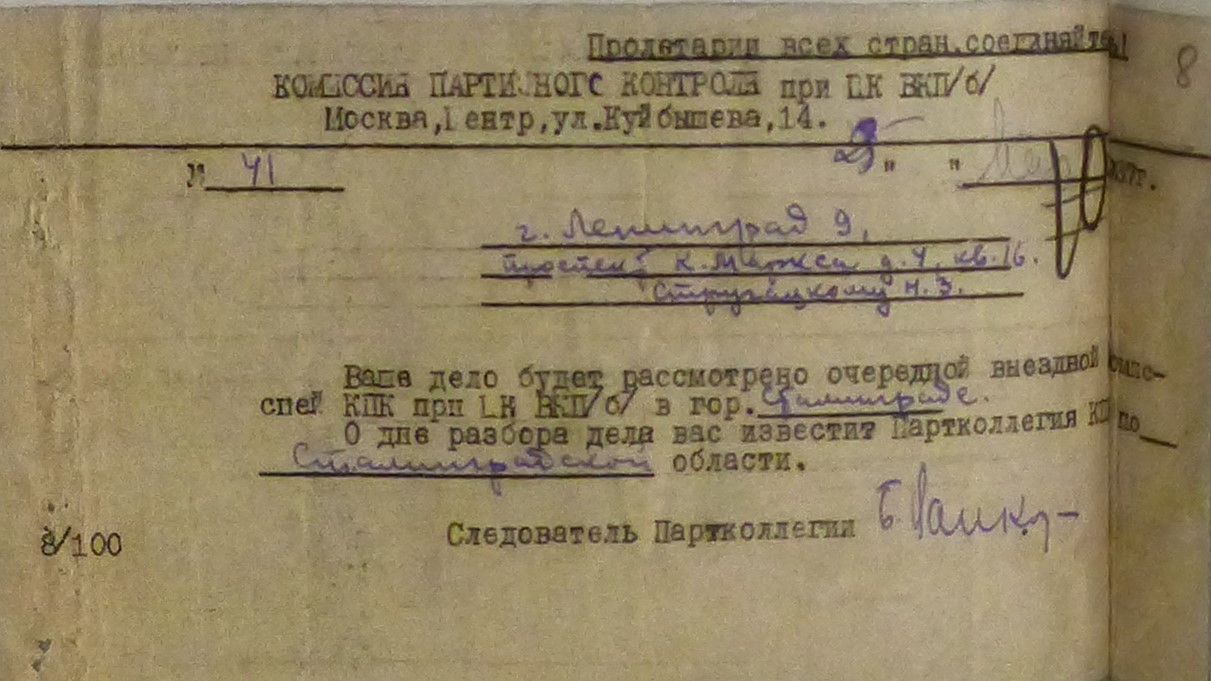
Notice from the Party Control Commission under the Central Committee of the VKP(b) regarding the review of Natan Strugatsky's case, March 25, 1937

=== Postgraduate Studies, Party Mobilization, and Expulsion from the VKP(b) ===
From 1928 to 1930, Natan Strugatsky served as head of the methodological section of the museum and excursion sector of the Department of Public Education (ONO). In 1930, he enrolled in postgraduate studies at the State Institute of Art History under the Communist Academy. He was mentioned in the diary of Pavel Filonov in a highly negative context: at a conference held on June 5–6, 1931, Strugatsky, as secretary of the Bureau of Political Education Work, along with Vladimir Beyer and Moisei Brodsky, sharply criticized Filonov's art. "They acted in their usual manner: deceit, lies, distortion of facts, and outright slander of an anti-Semitic, servile nature. <…> Clearly, they had strong support somewhere along the party line… I was labeled a saboteur, a malicious kulak, while they portrayed themselves as friends of the proletariat, 'more proletarian than the proletarians themselves'.' A resolution was adopted in this vein". A friend of Strugatsky, Alexander Samokhvalov, noted in his memoirs that when working on the painting Girl in a T-Shirt in 1932 (while Strugatsky was writing a short monograph about the artist), the art historian approached the image "with caution and even prejudice". Strugatsky believed that "the spirit of the era is primarily revealed through labor and overcoming difficulties on the path to achievements, leaving no time to be so beautiful", a view Samokhvalov strongly disagreed with. Natan Strugatsky was a member of the Union of Soviet Artists in the graphics section. In his 1937 autobiography, he noted that he was working on a candidate's dissertation. Based on his correspondence with Samokhvalov, Strugatsky viewed art as an arena for class struggle and a battle for the future, frequently issuing invectives against "petty compromisers" and "scoundrels, gravediggers of Soviet art". He once directly called the Union of Soviet Artists a "Noah's Ark", expecting no "principled or consistent" political line from the organization. In a letter to Samokhvalov dated March 12, 1933, he essentially outlined a programmatic manifesto: in his view, the Union of Artists should be led by a group that is the "bearer of the most progressive ideological and creative trends". Leadership should not act as a "guiding pole", as managing creative processes is always about "the line… that very tone which creates the entire creative music". Accordingly, a Soviet leader must combine "broad perspective, competence, and principle" to "set the tone".

In October 1932, he began working at the Russian Museum, initially as a secretary, and from January 18, 1933, as a research associate. In the same year, he was mobilized by the Central Committee of the VKP(b) for political work as the head of the political department of the "Zelenovsky" and "Gigant" (Prokopyevsk) grain sovkhozes in Stalingrad Oblast. Boris Strugatsky repeatedly recounted a family legend that his father was "thrown into the bread" on the night of his birth—April 15, 1933. However, a letter to Samokhvalov dated March 12, 1933, indicates that Natan Zalmanovich was already in Stalingrad, where repairs to trailed equipment, tractors, and vehicles were underway in his assigned farm, with sowing planned for April. An undated letter reports that Commissar Strugatsky "achieved fifty percent of the plan" and that "all my time, attention, thoughts, and chaotic dreams are occupied with the tractor fleet, sowing norms, combine repairs, the steam campaign, and other prosaic matters". A letter from March 28 lists "theaters, the red Olympiad, the philharmonic, the opera studio…" The snow had not yet melted, and Strugatsky compared the landscapes to White silence, with the need to ensure ultra-early scattered sowing immediately after the snow melted, followed by row sowing on 70000 hectares with 2,000 people and 200 tractors. A letter from May 7 was sent from Prokopyevsk, where Natan Zalmanovich had removed the local sovkhoz director from his post: "you understand, party reputation". In October, Strugatsky was still in Prokopyevsk; during the summer, according to indirect mentions, Alexandra Ivanovna and the children visited him, returning to Leningrad on October 9. In December, Natan Zalmanovich attended a sovkhoz construction meeting in Novosibirsk; his family visited again: "It's terribly hard without the family, but it's not easy for my family here either". A letter from May 2, 1934, was sent from "Zelenovsky".

In 1936–1937, he served as head of the regional arts administration in Stalingrad. In correspondence with Samokhvalov (an undated letter), Strugatsky reported that he oversaw ten theaters (including a Tatar drama theater and three kolkhoz theaters), a philharmonic, and a music hall. "I find solace only in nurturing the Union of Artists and teaching a course on art history at the art technical school". In April 1937, he was expelled from the Communist Party and dismissed from his position for "blunting political vigilance". Boris Strugatsky commented: "My father was an orthodox communist, never wavered, never participated in any oppositions, believed in the party unconditionally, and followed its orders like a soldier. Yet somehow, he managed to maintain a broad mindset when it came to literature, painting, and culture in general. Later, in Stalingrad <…>, he constantly clashed with his colleagues. He would claim that Soviet painters should learn craftsmanship from Andrei Rublev, or declare that Nikolai Ostrovsky was a pup compared to Leo Tolstoy, and Isaac Dunayevsky—compared to Tchaikovsky and Rimsky-Korsakov. My mother believed that these polemical escapades ruined him, but I think the main factor was that he banned the issuance of free complimentary tickets to the wives of city officials for theaters and concerts". Natan Strugatsky's situation was further complicated by the arrest of his younger brother, engineer and director of the Kherson wind engine factory, Alexander Zakharovich Strugatsky (1905–1938), under the Stalin's execution lists (executed on January 17, 1938). According to Boris Strugatsky, his father's life was spared only because he immediately went to Moscow to seek justice.

=== Leningrad public library and artistic work ===
On October 17, 1937, Natan Z. Strugatsky was hired by the Saltykov-Shchedrin Public Library as the chief librarian of the prints department (from March 25, 1938, as head of the department) with a salary of 450 rubles. Since the late 1920s, Strugatsky had published literary and art reviews. From the early 1930s, he produced art history and bibliographic works, introductory articles for exhibition catalogs, and studies on the illustrations (iconography) of Mikhail Saltykov-Shchedrin. Together with Boris Butnik-Siversky, he compiled a catalog of Soviet posters from the Russian Civil War, published as the seventh volume of the Proceedings of the Public Library.

Numerous documents from 1937–1938 in Natan Z. Strugatsky's personnel file reflect his personal struggle for reinstatement in the party ranks. A handwritten statement dated November 25, 1937, notes his trip to Stalingrad for an appeal conducted by the visiting commission of the Party Control Commission under the Central Committee of the VKP(b) in Stalingrad Oblast. He was issued a work certificate stating that Natan Zalmanovich "performs his duties conscientiously and accurately" and that he was tasked with leading two study groups on the Constitution and the Election Regulations for the Supreme Soviet of the USSR. The appeal was unsuccessful, but in 1938, Strugatsky made several more trips to Stalingrad and then to Moscow. His performance reviews consistently noted that he was a "capable and proactive worker", that he "initiated the scientific description of the department's rich collections", and that he took the lead in organizing traveling exhibitions based on the department's materials at houses of culture. However, he was unable to be immediately reinstated in the VKP(b), even though those who initiated his expulsion were themselves convicted as "enemies of the people".

There are few specialized studies on Natan Z. Strugatsky's work as an art historian. I. M. Blyanova's essay highlights the "fortunate combination" of his diverse interests, depth of erudition, and insight into the issues of the past and present. Strugatsky's research bridged art history and literary studies, partly due to the specifics of his work at the Public Library. Taking over the prints department, which was in disarray in 1937, Strugatsky tackled the organization and description of collections that included not only printed reproductions but also original graphic posters and illustrations. The department also compiled reviews of visual materials and conducted iconographic studies. In 1939, Strugatsky published a guide on the iconography of Mikhail Saltykov-Shchedrin, covering both his portraits and illustrations to his works. He also studied the iconography of Maxim Gorky; an unpublished manuscript, Gorky in the Visual Arts, preserved in the Russian National Library archive, lists portraits of the writer that later disappeared from researchers' view. Strugatsky devoted significant effort to identifying drawings in the collection, summarized in a 1938 article in the journal Krasny Bibliotekar. With his participation, collective catalogs on the iconography of the Russian Revolution of 1905–1907 and Civil War posters were published (the latter as a signal copy). Strugatsky also worked in pure art history, focusing on the paintings of Alexander Samokhvalov during his postgraduate years, with whom he was personally acquainted and to whom he dedicated a monograph (1933). Strugatsky declared Samokhvalov a painter of originality and great talent. (Note: In a letter to Samokhvalov dated January 22, 1934, Strugatsky lamented that the monograph's publication was riddled with typos and lacked reproductions of the artist's latest works.Samokhvalov 1996, p. 236) Letters from Natan Strugatsky to Samokhvalov, preserved in the family archive, were published in 1996.

Natan Strugatsky's Personnel File at the Public Library (1937–1941)

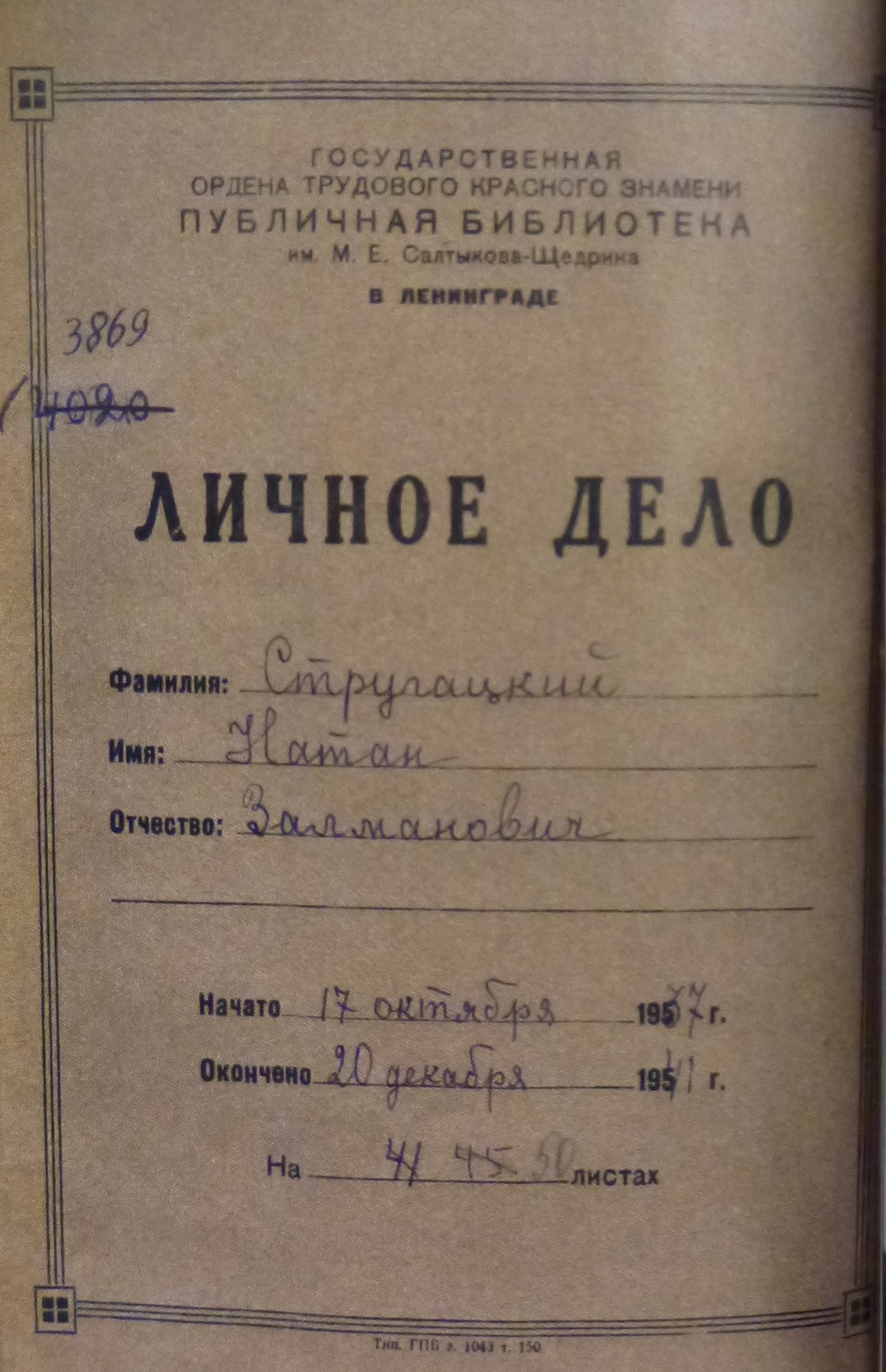
Cover of Strugatsky's file

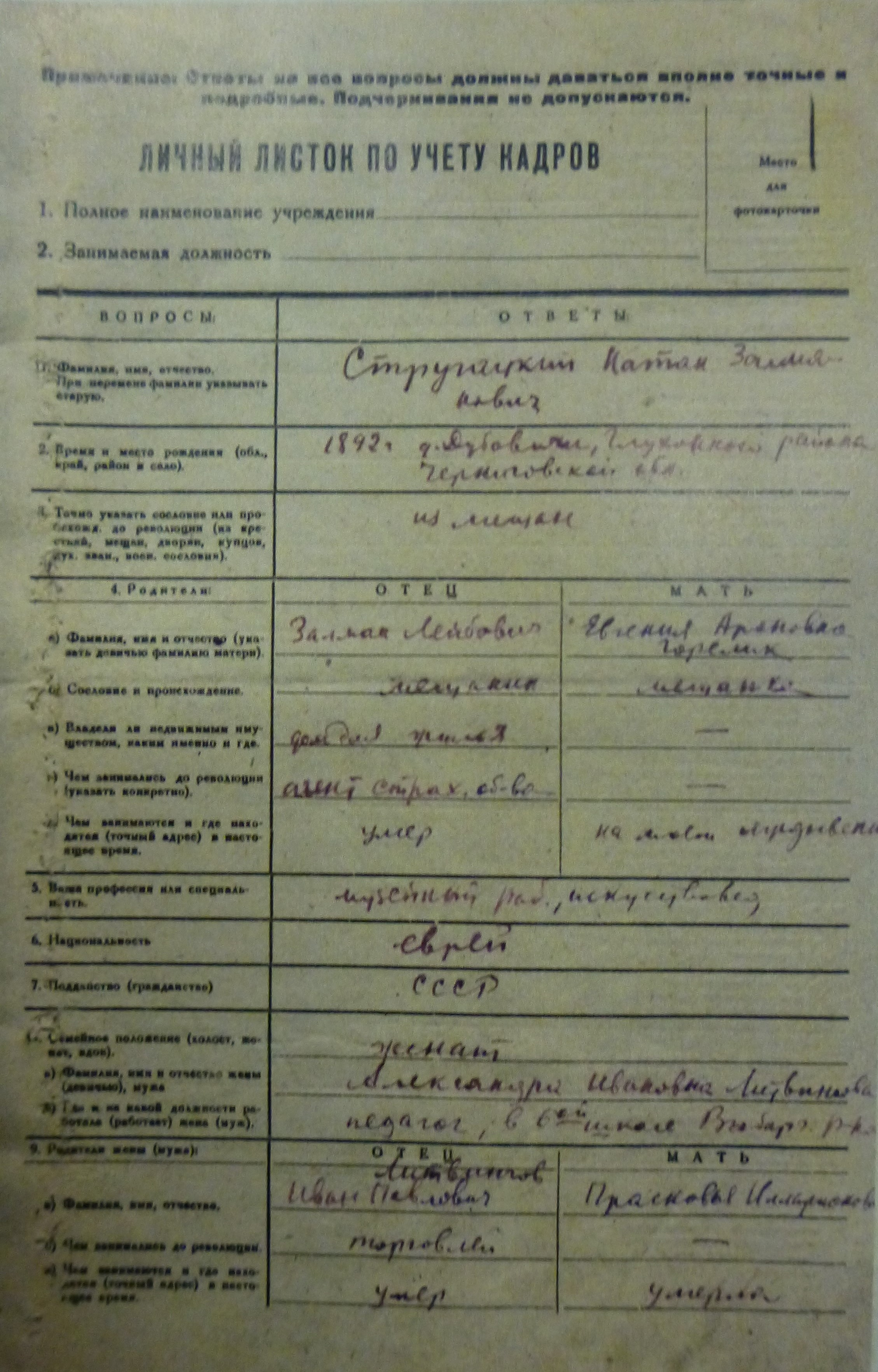
First page

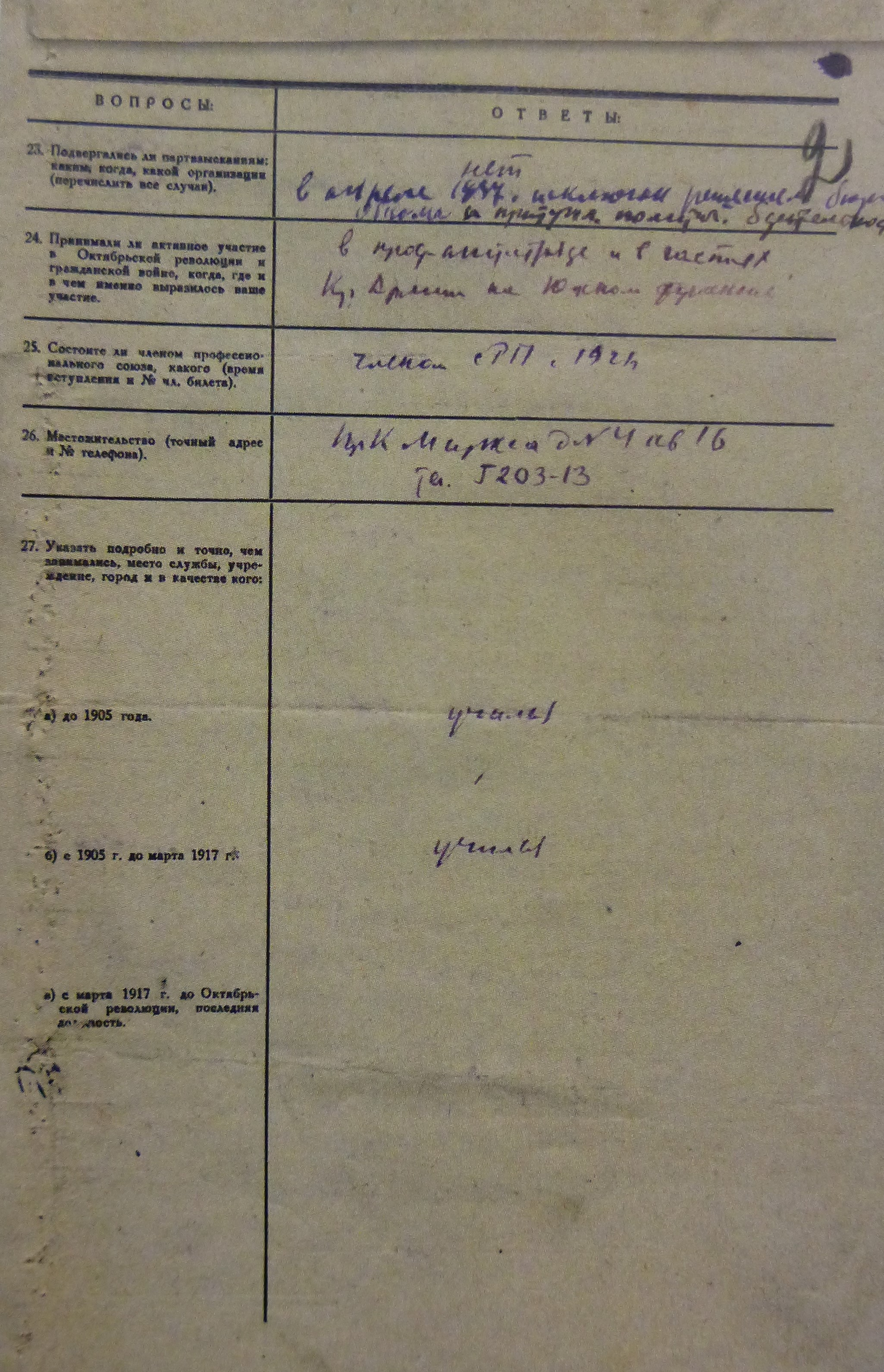
Second page

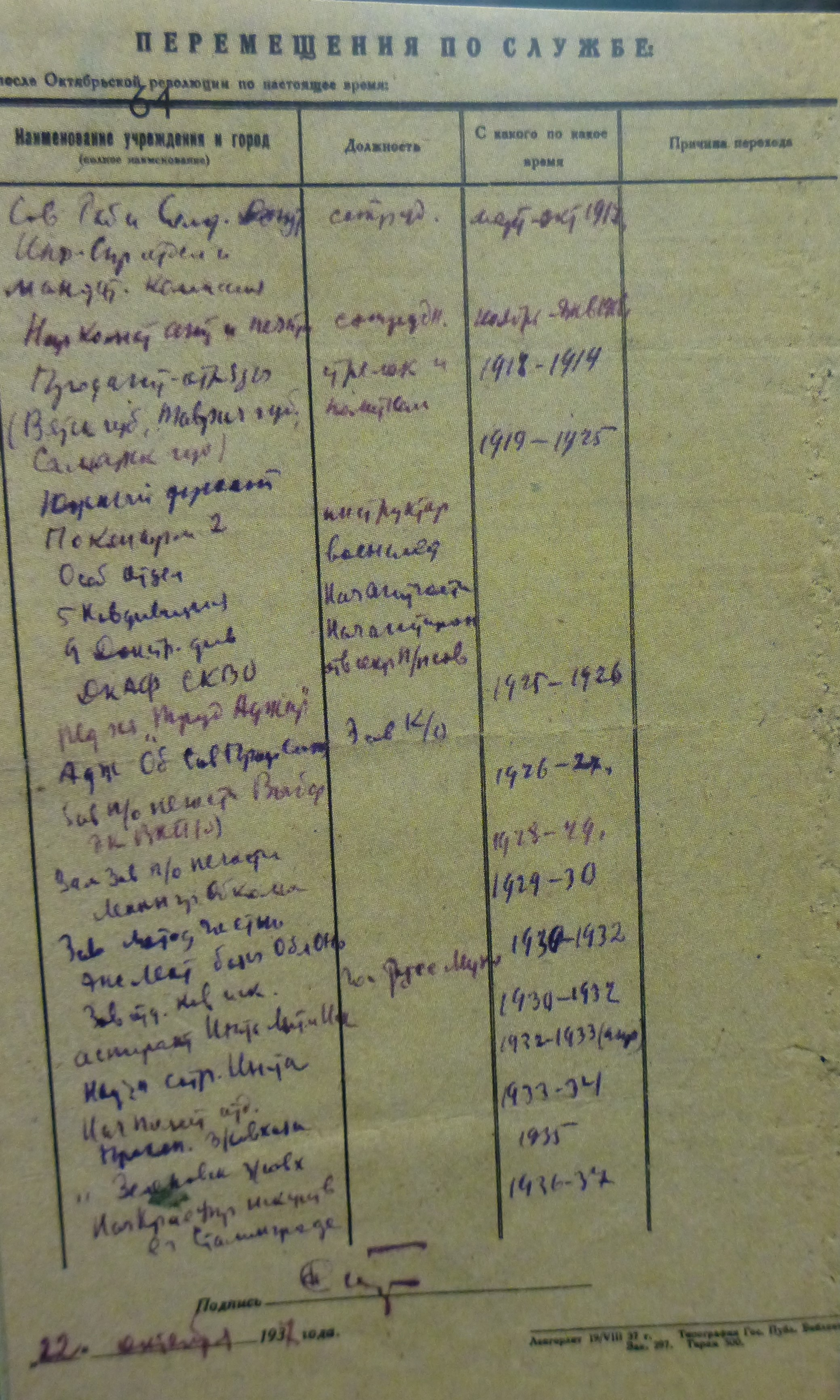
Third page

The first half of 1941 passed routinely for the Strugatsky family. Diary entries from March 8 and 9, 1941, mention attending concerts featuring David Oistrakh and Lev Oborin, whom Strugatsky described as "masters of European caliber". The performance of Dmitri Shostakovich's Fourth Concerto and Piano Quintet made a particular impression ("Certain parts of the quintet, especially the scherzo, bear the mark of undeniable genius. Shostakovich… will yet astonish the world"). In the spring (April 27–May 10), Strugatsky was sent to the Moscow Directorate of Art Exhibitions and Panoramas under the All-Union Committee for the Arts at the Council of People's Commissars; shortly after (May 17–June 1), he was sent again to the Committee to organize a Soviet poster exhibition. The start of the Great Patriotic War was marked in Strugatsky's diary as "the most tragic day in the country's history and, consequently, in our family's life".

On September 19, 1941, Natan Zalmanovich Strugatsky volunteered for the army. Along with his son Arkady, he joined the people's militia, digging anti-tank ditches near Kingisepp and on Moskovskoye Shosse (Alexandra Strugatskaya and her school were mobilized to Gatchina). He later served in a work detachment under barracks conditions at his workplace. A letter dated October 25, signed by the battalion commander and commissar, confirmed his "full settlement at the workplace" due to his enlistment in the 212th Fighter Battalion of the NKGB in the Kuibyshevsky District; he was officially dismissed from the Public Library on October 27. He participated in combat operations at the Pulkovo Heights: Arkady Strugatsky recalled in 1950 correspondence with his younger brother that "our father saw the destruction of the Pulkovo Observatory. He escorted ammunition to the front and witnessed the German long-range artillery bombardment of Pulkovo (including the observatory). I remember him telling this on the kitchen, warming his feet in a basin of hot water—bearded, dirty". On October 27, 1941, Strugatsky was accepted as a candidate member of the VKP(b) as the best commander of a fighter detachment, effectively restoring his party membership. Due to health issues (dystrophy and heart failure), Natan Zalmanovich Strugatsky was discharged and, following his release from military service on December 20, 1941, was reinstated at the Public Library.

== Death and legacy ==
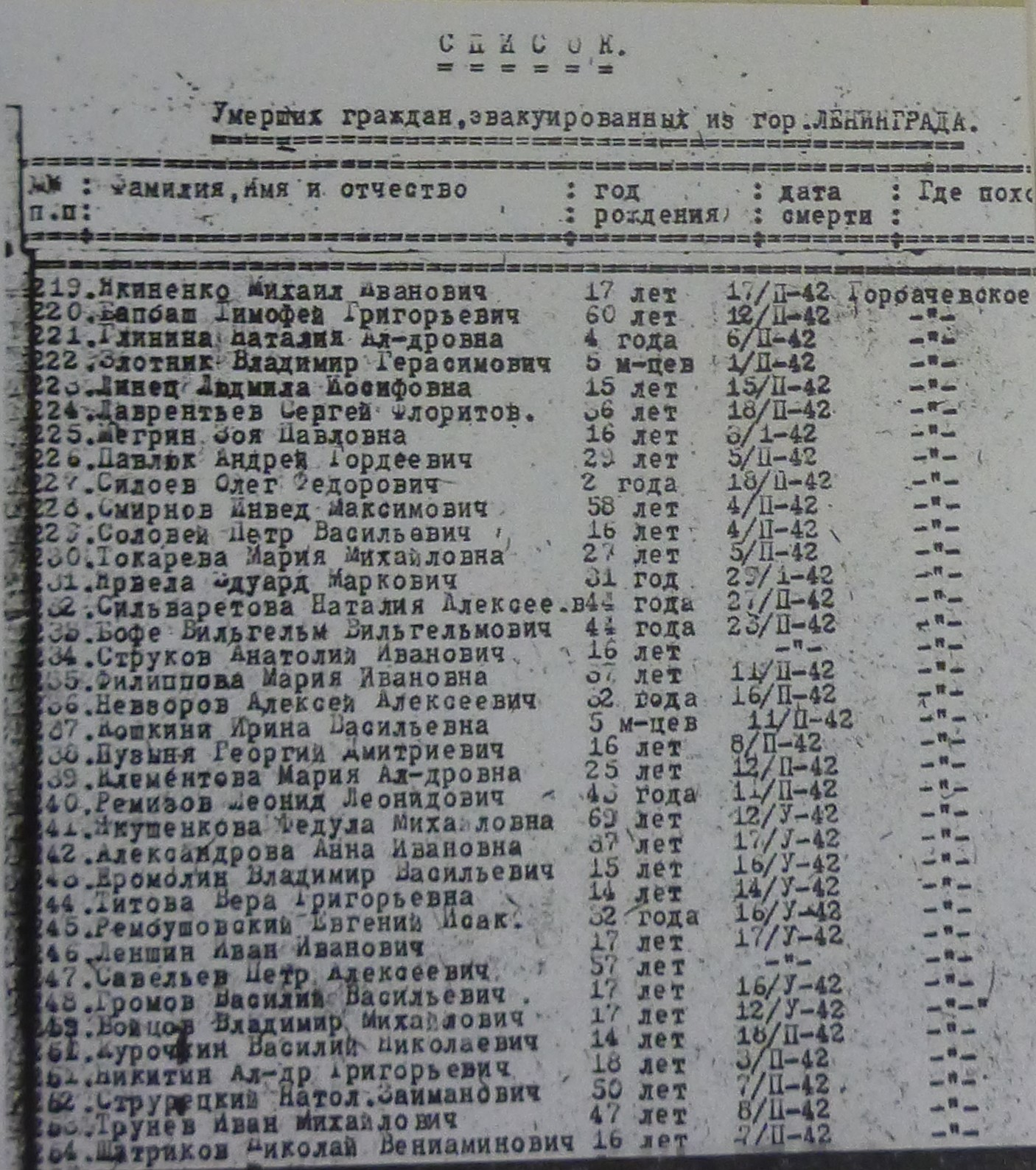
Natan Strugatsky (listed as "Natol Struretsky") in the list of deceased citizens evacuated from Leningrad, buried at Gorbachevskoye Cemetery

=== Evacuation (1942) ===
Natan Z. Strugatsky's diary from December 1941 to January 1942 documents the struggle for survival in the besieged Leningrad. According to Boris Strugatsky's recollections, the family's survival was aided by Alexandra Ivanovna's habit of stockpiling firewood in the spring rather than autumn, allowing them to heat the kitchen and Arkady's room. An entry from December 22 notes "the torments of hunger: 145 grams of bread, no fats, no grains"; hands and faces swelled from dystrophy and avitaminosis. Meat was obtained from cats, with Natan Zalmanovich catching seven. (Note: In later recollections, Alexandra Strugatskaya recounted: "Arkady, as if possessed, read a cookbook, compiled menus, gnashed his teeth… Father forbade him to do this, then once struck him painfully and tore the book from his hands… (I cried.) Father feared he might lose his mind…"Strugatsky & Strugatsky 2015, p. 347, V. Kurilsky, R. Murinsky, L. Rudman. Comments and Notes In Arkady's own diary on December 25, 1941, he noted plans to study mathematics and theoretical astronomy, adding an "illicit… matter: 'Culinary'. I will devote an hour daily to it." The school was still functioning; the diary mentions three lessons that day and records the deaths of classmates from hunger and disease.Strugatsky & Strugatsky 2015, p. 186, Arkady Strugatsky Diary, 1941. 25/XII On January 2, 1942, Natan Strugatsky wrote: "Ark took hidden biscuits, a rusk, and a candy for Boris from the cupboard—disgusting, despicable! He's ashamed and frightened."Strugatsky & Strugatsky 2015, p. 178, N. Z. Strugatsky, A. I. Strugatskaya. Family Chronicle, 1941–1951. [N. Z. Strugatsky's handwriting] Boris Strugatsky claimed there were thirteen cats: "Father and Arkady caught them, Father killed them in the bathroom and butchered them."Bondarenko & Kurilsky 2008, p. 34) The diary lists the names of deceased friends and library colleagues (three in December, five in January). On December 25 and 27, 1941, the ration was slightly increased, but even by starvation standards, no butter or grains were provided (on January 2, 1942, bran was issued instead). Alexandra Ivanovna took payment in food for extra lessons, and on January 1, the Strugatskys traded the use of their bathroom (with a wood-fired heater and occasional running water) to bakery saleswomen for "bread and candies". Food was also bartered for goods at the market. On January 3, Natan's mother died, causing much trouble for the household; her son candidly wrote in his diary that they "moved the body to a cold room, sighed with relief"; Natan and Arkady carried the body, sewn in a shroud, to a shed on Saratovskaya Street only on January 15. On January 18, an opportunity arose to evacuate the family to Melekess with the last group of Public Library employees and collections.

Alexandra Strugatskaya, continuing her husband's diary, recorded that an attempt to evacuate the entire family was made on January 25, 1942. However, a water main failure prevented refilling the locomotive, and 16-year-old Arkady frostbit his foot (having soaked his felt boot at a water hole that morning). The bread ration issued until February 1 ran out on January 27, with market prices noted: 500 grams of bread for new felt boots, a kilogram for gold watches ("the market is full of goods, but no food"). Alexandra Ivanovna brought home her rationed lunch from the district soviet: "soup and porridge, I boil it, diluting with water, and divide it into four plates. They watch who gets more or less, suspicions, arguments, reproaches that I love Arkady more, that Boris is small and needs less, yet he collects crumbs. My heart bleeds". At a family meeting, they decided to split up: Boris and Alexandra might not survive the evacuation, and she had to walk five kilometers to work daily (public transport had stopped). Natan Z. Strugatsky and Arkady departed on January 29; as 8-year-old Boris told his mother, Arkady carried his father on his back. Nothing was known of their fate until a telegram on May 17: "Strugatsky did not arrive in Melekess".

On July 2, 1942, a letter from Arkady arrived from Tashla, Chkalov Oblast, followed by another on July 11. These contained no details beyond the fact of his father's death. The full account emerged on August 1, when Alexandra Ivanovna received a letter dated July 27, addressed to Arkady's school friend Igor Ashmarin. The evacuees were transported to Borisova Griva for one and a half days in unheated suburban train cars in twenty-five-degree frost. During the truck transport across the ice of Lake Ladoga, the vehicle fell into a polynya, but did not sink, though the passengers arrived in Zhikharevo covered in ice. "…The evacuation point chief committed a grave crime—issuing each evacuee a loaf of bread and a pot of porridge. Everyone pounced on the food, and when the train to Vologda departed that day, no one could stand. Dysentery began". Natan Zalmanovich could barely move. The freight car to Vologda held about thirty people, of whom eleven survived the eight-day journey: the car had a stove but no firewood, and food was issued every three to four days. Arkady Strugatsky was unclear on the date of their arrival in Vologda: 4 a.m. on February 7 or 8, 1942. Father and son were removed from the train to be taken to a hospital. "Here Father fell and said he wouldn't take another step. I begged, cried—in vain. Then I went berserk. I cursed him with the foulest words and threatened to strangle him on the spot. It worked. He got up, and, supporting each other, we reached the station. <…> I remember nothing more. <…> The next day, I was informed of Father's death. I received the news with deep indifference and only wept a week later, biting the pillow". (Note: In the first letter to reach Leningrad, Arkady also wrote: "On the day of departure, Father fell ill. We arrived in Vologda on 7/II. Father was in a terrible state by then, and I was no better".Strugatsky & Strugatsky 2015, p. 187, Arkady to mother, June 15, 1942, Tashla–L.)

Alexandra Strugatskaya hand-copied this letter into the diary, adding the following dedication:

This is how my dear friend died! Forgive me, forgive me, my love, I am guilty of your death, I will never forget this, I will preserve your bright memory until my last days, this I swear to you.

=== Archival Research and Monument ===
Until the early 2000s, Natan Z. Strugatsky's fate was known only through his son Arkady's accounts. The 2003 reference book Employees of the Russian National Library—Figures of Science and Culture briefly mentions his death en route without details. The 2010 publication Pages of Memory, dedicated to Leningrad's cultural figures, states that "N. Z. Strugatsky died en route under unclear circumstances". However, in 1990–1991, lists of deceased Leningrad evacuees from five evacuation hospitals (from the State Archive of Vologda Oblast) were published in Vologda, including Natan Z. Strugatsky under No. 3970, with his name recorded as "Natol", along with his date of death (February 7, 1942), Leningrad address, and position. From 2008 to 2018, journalist A. Sizov of the SeverInform news agency researched the burial site of Natan Z. Strugatsky. In 2008, Sizov located a list of Leningraders buried at Gorbachevskoye Cemetery in Peace Park, containing 1,858 names, in the State Archive of Vologda Oblast. Under No. 1262, the list (retyped in the 1960s) recorded Struretsky Natol. Zaimanovich; the errors arose from handling the handwritten original. The date of death was also listed as February 7. Abandoned and marshy burial sites of blockade victims were found near the cemetery's central alley, but pinpointing Natan Z. Strugatsky's exact burial site was impossible due to the passage of time. A decade-long effort led to the creation of a memorial for the deceased blockade victims; numerous requests and approvals occupied much of 2018. The monument was transported from St. Petersburg to Vologda on December 11, 2018, and installed near the Lazarevsky Church on January 22, 2019.

Natan Z. Strugatsky's personnel file from his final period at the Public Library was discovered in 2019 by historian Anatoly Razumov in the Russian National Library archive and published by Boris Vishnevsky.

=== Historiography ===
The role of the father in shaping the future writers is emphasized in all their biographies. The Short Jewish Encyclopedia (and an article by American Slavist M. Grinberg) notes that the Strugatskys considered themselves Russian writers, but their father's Jewish heritage left traces of national reflection and contemplations on the essence of Jewish identity and its role in world history in many of their works. Soviet and Israeli literary scholar Mark Amusin, who thoroughly explored the theme of Jewishness in the Strugatskys' works, noted that many characters with Jewish surnames and corresponding linguistic and cognitive traits appear in their writings, undoubtedly as a tribute to their father. Many aspects of Jewish mentality and spirituality can be found in the character of Peretz in Snail on the Slope: a hero seeking justice, truth, and meaning, while being a social outsider forced to navigate a grotesque, absurd reality. Like many emancipated Jews, Peretz is sometimes burdened by his freedom and rootlessness, yearning for integration into a collective or unifying ideology.

Biographer of the Strugatskys Anton Skalandis summarized Natan Zalmanovich's life as follows:

Untouchable Reserve of our culture—lawyer, art historian, and red commissar Strugatsky—was, of course, not utilized to his maximum potential during wartime, but was used justifiably and, most importantly, in time. He managed to give the world, raise, and set on their feet two sons who brought fame to his surname worldwide.

== Publications ==
- "Рец.: [А. Фролов. Путанная жизнь]" [Review: [A. Frolov. Tangled Life]]. Литературно-художественный сборник «Красной панорамы» [Literary and Artistic Collection of "Red Panorama"] (6): 52–53. 1929.
- "Огонь по халтуре" [Fire on Hackwork]. Залп [Salvo] (5–6). 1932.
- "Александр Самохвалов" [Alexander Samokhvalov]. Искусство [Art] (5). 1933.
- Александр Самохвалов [Alexander Samokhvalov]. Masters of Modern Painting. Leningrad–Moscow: Ogiz-Izogiz. 1933.
- "M. I. Glinka в рисунках I. E. Repina" [M. I. Glinka in the Drawings of Ilya Repin]. Искусство и жизнь [Art and Life] (9): 43. 1938.
- "Что читать о советском плакате" [What to Read About the Soviet Poster]. Выставка политического плаката и массовой картины «У нас и у них»: Путеводитель по выставке со вступительной статьёй и указателем литературы [Exhibition of Political Posters and Mass Paintings "At Home and Abroad": Exhibition Guide with Introductory Article and Literature Index]. Leningrad: Typography of the Saltykov-Shchedrin State Public Library. 1938. p. 17.
- Выставка «20 лет РККА и Военно-морского флота в политическом плакате и массовой картине»: Путеводитель по выставке со вступительной статьёй [Exhibition "20 Years of the Red Army and Navy in Political Posters and Mass Paintings": Exhibition Guide with Introductory Article]. Leningrad: State Public Library. 1938.
- "Фонды эстампов, их обработка и использование" [Print Collections, Their Processing, and Use]. Красный библиотекарь [Red Librarian] (12). 1938.
- O. E. Voltsenburg, ed. (1939). Указатель портретов М. Е. Салтыкова-Щедрина и иллюстраций к его произведениям [Index of Portraits of M. E. Saltykov-Shchedrin and Illustrations to His Works]. Leningrad: State Public Library.
- Natan Strugatsky; E. N. Zhilina; Boris Saitov; Liya Frankfurt (1940). Сталин и о Сталине: Указатель литературы [Stalin and About Stalin: Literature Index].
- Co-authored with Boris Butnik-Siversky (1941). O. E. Voltsenburg (ed.). Советский плакат эпохи гражданской войны: Каталог. Выпуск 1: Фронтовой плакат [Soviet Poster of the Civil War Era: Catalog. Issue 1: Frontline Poster]. Leningrad: Proceedings of the State Public Library.

== Bibliography ==
- Amusin, Mark Fomich (1996). The Strugatsky Brothers: An Overview of Their Work. Jerusalem: Besseder. p. 187. ISBN 965-7031-06-0.
- Blyanova, I. M. (2010). "N. Z. Strugatsky, 1892–1942". In Basov, Y. V.; Konova, L. S.; Konova, L. S.; Balakhnina, L. V. (eds.). Pages of Memory: A Reference-Memorial Collection: Artists of the Leningrad Union of Soviet Artists Who Died During the Great Patriotic War and the Siege of Leningrad, 1941–1945. St. Petersburg: Petropolis Publishing House. pp. 235–236. ISBN 978-5-9676-0265-8.
- Vishnevsky, B. L. (2022). Double Star: The Worlds of the Strugatsky Brothers. St. Petersburg: Galich House. p. 456.
- Vishnevsky, B. L. (2021). "The Personal File of Natan Strugatsky". Diletant (061): 63.
- Volodihin, D. M.; Prashkevich, G. M. (2012). The Strugatsky Brothers: Dreams of the Unfulfilled. Lives of Remarkable People, no. 1331. Moscow: Molodaya Gvardiya. p. 350. ISBN 978-5-235-03475-4.
- Kryuchkovsky, S. A. (2003). Shilov, L. A. (ed.). Employees of the Russian National Library: Figures in Science and Culture. Vol. 3: State Public Library in Leningrad – M. E. Saltykov-Shchedrin State Public Library, 1931–1945. St. Petersburg: Russian National Library Publishing. pp. 530–532. ISBN 5-8192-0167-1.
- Matlina, S. (2013). "Why Do We Need the Strugatskys' Science Fiction?". Library Business. Library Business.
- Mikhailova, N. (2012). "The Last Refuge". Premier: Regional Socio-Political Newspaper (in Russian). Premier. Archived from the original on 2018-02-03.
- Bondarenko, S. P.; Kurilsky, V. M. (2008). Unknown Strugatskys: Letters and Working Diaries, 1942–1962. Worlds of the Strugatsky Brothers. Moscow, Donetsk: ACT, NKP. p. 640. ISBN 978-5-17-053845-4.
- Requiem for the Memory of Evacuated Leningraders Buried in the Vologda Region During the Great Patriotic War. Vol. II: L–Ya. Vologda: Vologda State Pedagogical Institute. 1991. p. 670.
- Samokhvalov, A. N. (1996). "Письма Натана Стругацкого А. Н. Самохвалову" [Letters from Natan Strugatsky to A. N. Samokhvalov]. In M. Kleshchar-Samokhvalova (ed.). В годы беспокойного солнца: Проза. Статьи. О художнике: Критика, воспоминания, письма [In the Years of the Restless Sun: Prose, Articles, About the Artist: Criticism, Memoirs, Letters]. Saint Petersburg: Vsemirnoye Slovo. pp. 228–238. ISBN 5-86442-020-4.
- Skalandis, Ant (2008). The Strugatsky Brothers. Moscow: AST. p. 702. ISBN 978-5-17-052684-0.
- Sizov, A. (2008). "The Memory of the Strugatskys Buried in a Wasteland". Nasha Vologda: 7.
- Strugatsky, Arkady; Strugatsky, Boris (2015). Bondarenko, Svetlana; Kurilsky, Viktor; Fleishman, Yuri (eds.). Complete Works in Thirty-Three Volumes. Vol. 1: 1941–1957. Ludeny Group. p. 416.
