= Severynivka =

Severynivka may refer to:

- Severinovca, Camenca District, Moldova (Ukrainian spelling)
- Severynivka, Vinnytsia Oblast, Ukraine
