= Battle of Veseloe =

- Part of the Eastern Front of World War II and German anti-partisan operations
Date	28 February 1942
Location	Vesele, Konotop Raion, Sumy Oblast, German-occupied Ukraine
Result	Soviet victory

Belligerents
Ukrainian partisans	Germany; Hungary

Commanders and leaders
Sidor Kovpak; Semyon Rudnev (WIA)	Gen. Blauman

The Battle of Veseloe or Battle of Vesele took place as a result of attack launched by the German-Hungarian forces during their punitive operation against the Soviet partisans, on 28 February 1942.

== Prelude ==
On 22 February, German forces detected Soviet partisans who held a ceremonial parade in Dubovychi, and a German punitive expedition was sent to terminate partisans on 23 February. The battle ended in partisan victory.

Sidor Kovpak realised that soon a larger German-Hungarian expedition will come after them. Kovpak chose the village of Vesele, which Kovpak believed was the best defensive position. In addition, he intended to trick Axis troops into believing that they got partisans into a trap, while inflicting as many casualties as possible on the enemy. Kovpak and Rudnev intended to defend the Vesele village with 4 units, while 5th unit was ordered to be stationed in the village of Baydarov. On 27 February, Kovpak issues his orders.

== Battle ==
On 28 February, the German-Hungarian forces began their attack. The Axis troops intended to attack the village from 4 sides, surrounding it, with the main blow intending to come from northwest. Axis troops were supported by mortars and artillery. The positions that the partisans took up were defensively advantageous, in which the Axis troops could not even see the villages they were firing on.

500 Axis troops launched an attack from the side of Pogarychi village, but they were repelled by partisans and suffered heavy losses. Axis troops again shelled partisans in the Shalygino village, as a supporting measure to encourage their troops to continue attacking. Axis troops launched another attack but were repelled after one-hour firefight and the shelling stopped due to winter conditions. After two hours, Axis troops begun shelling Shalygino again, while only stopped when Axis troops were attacking Vesele.

Axis troops attempted to approach Vesele. Defenders allowed them to approach it before opening fire. Partisans were surrounded but had favourable combat positions. The Axis troops were completely exposed in the snow which led to heavy casualties.

The most decisive battle took place in the forest, during north-western Axis attack. The partisans managed to take the Axis troops marching in column by surprise and ambush them, with Axis forces at first not being able to respond to partisan fire. The Axis troops were eventually defeated, leaving behind hundreds of wounded in the snow. This maneuver allowed Kovpak to throw in his reserve unit to win the battle, as the enemy now lost his combat capability.

== Aftermath ==
The whole battle lasted 11 hours and ended in partisan victory. As a result of the battle, Axis forces suffered 250–600 killed, and 700 wounded or captured. Soviet partisans suffered 11–13 killed and unspecified number of wounded. Among the wounded was partisan commander Semyon Rudnev. In March, partisans moved back into Bryansk forest, but returned to Sumy Oblast in mid-May.

== Legacy ==
The Battle of Veseloe became popularised, gaining legendary status thanks to the 1976 film called "Duma about Kovpak" by a studio named after A. Dovzhenko.

== Bibliography ==
- Гладков; Кизя, Т. К.; Л. Е. (1973). Ковпак. Серия: Жизнь замечательных людей (in Russian). Moscow: Молодая гвардия.
- Брайко, П.Е. (1983). Партизанский комиссар (in Russian). Moscow: Издательство ДОСААФ.
