= Battle of Dubovychi =

1942 World War II battle between Soviet partisans and German forces in Dubovychi, Ukraine

- Part of the Eastern Front of World War II and German anti-partisan operations
| Date | 23 February 1942 |
| Location | Dubovychi, Konotop Raion, Sumy Oblast, German-occupied Ukraine |
| Result | Soviet victory |

Belligerents
| Ukrainian partisans | Germany |

Commanders and leaders
| Sidor Kovpak; Semyon Rudnev | Gen. Blauman |

Strength
| Unknown | Unknown |

Casualties and losses
| 3 killed | 100 killed |

The Battle of Dubovychi took place as a result of the attack launched by the German forces on the partisan-held settlement as part of the punitive operation against the Soviet partisans, on 23 February 1942.

== Prelude ==
On 22 February, 1942, German forces detected Soviet partisans who held a ceremonial parade in Dubovychi. The parade was held to celebrate partisan capture of the village, where they put to trial local police collaborators, with around 500 local residents taking part in celebration. This was part of Rudnev's plan to attract German forces. However, German forces didn't dare to attack Dubovychi until 23 February, despite having three times more troops than the partisans.

== Battle ==
On 23 February, at 12pm, German infantry begun to approach Dubovychi from the direction of Zhukov settlement. As the punitive forces were 50 metres away from the village, partisans ambushed the forces. Two hours later, German cavalry approached from direction of another settlement, Yaroslavets. Partisans set up another ambush and withdrew to Dubovychi.

At 15pm, German infantry attacked Dubovychi from the eastern direction. The outcome of the battle was determined by the environment, as the thick leaden rain put German forces into unfavorable position and forced them to retreat.

== Aftermath ==
As a result of unsuccessful German punitive expedition attack on Dubovychi, Germans lost around 100 troops. Partisans only suffered 3 dead. Partisans later dug out ammunition and firearms buried under snow in the Sloat Forest. This was a significant victory for partisans that allowed them to hold off German forces for 2 days. Partisan commanders Kovpak and Rudnev later organised a defensive position in another settlement where a larger battle took place on 28 February.

== Bibliography ==
- Гладков; Кизя, Т. К.; Л. Е. (1973). Ковпак. Серия: Жизнь замечательных людей (in Russian). Moscow: Молодая гвардия.
- Брайко, П.Е. (1983). Партизанский комиссар (in Russian). Moscow: Издательство ДОСААФ.
