= Petergofsky District =

Administrative division of Petrograd, Russia (1917–19)

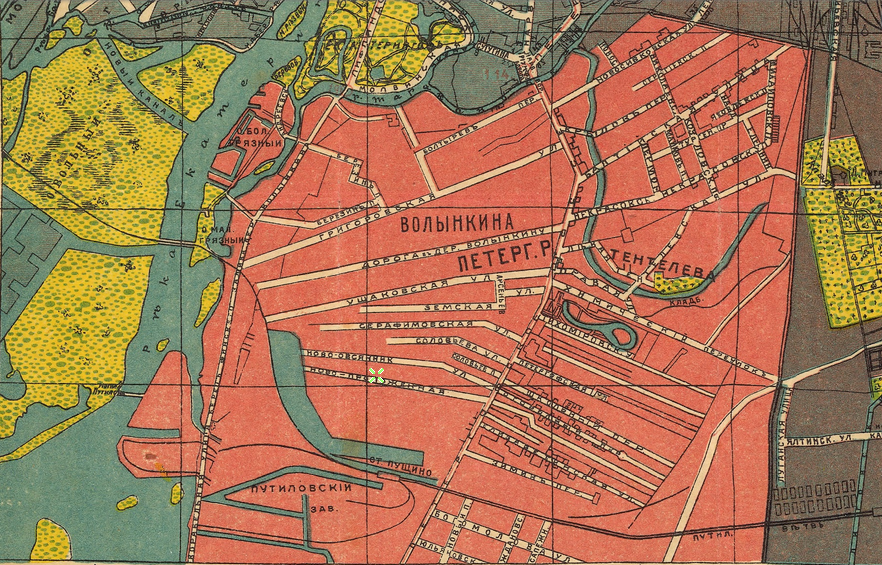
Map of Petergofsky District

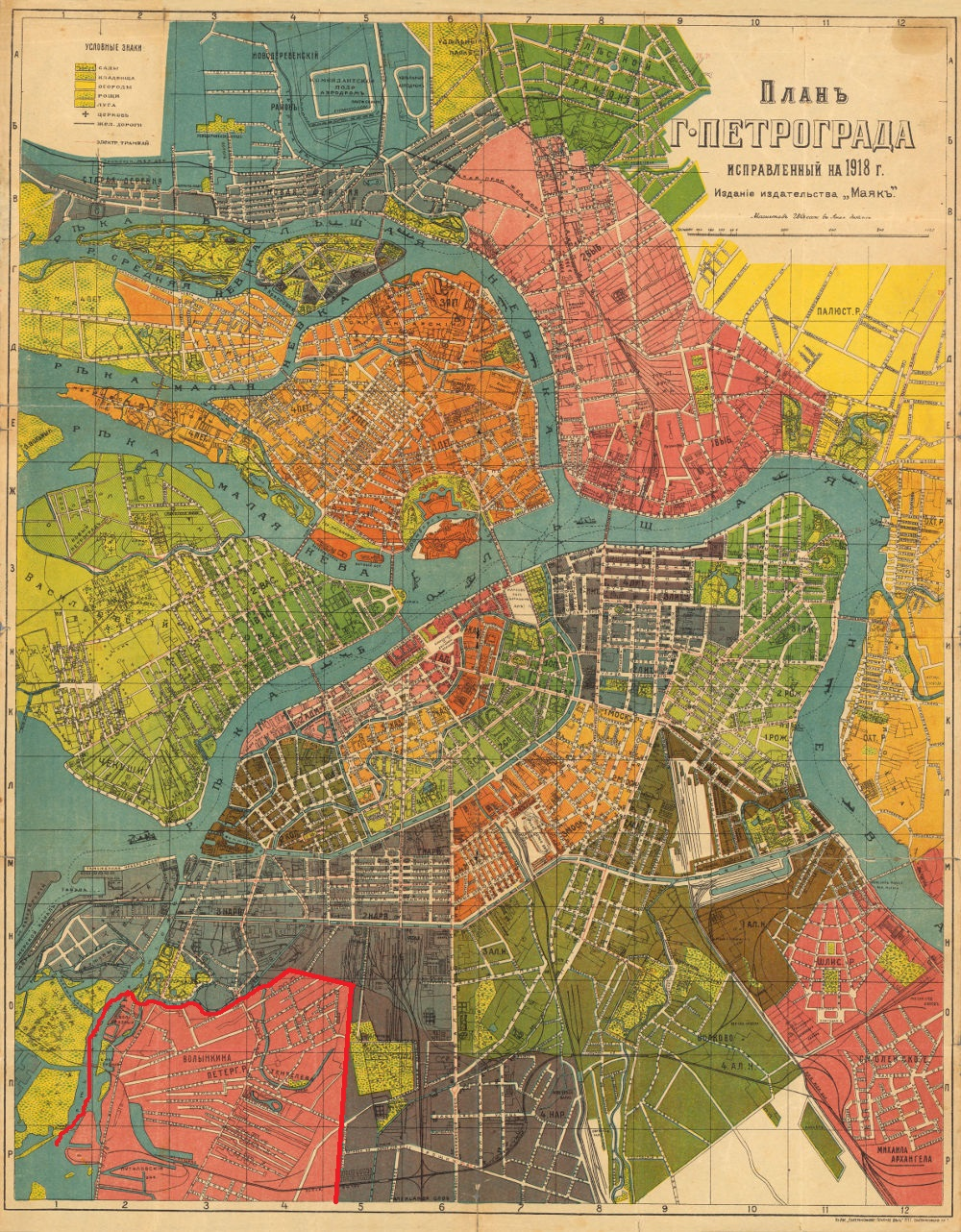
1918 Petrograd city map with Petergofsky District highlighted

Petergofsky District (Russian: Петергофский район) was an administrative division of the Russian capital Petrograd (present-day Saint Petersburg) between 1917 and 1919. It was a working-class area just outside the south-western frontier of Petrograd, which was incorporated into the city proper in mid-1917. The Putilov Ironworks, a major industrial facility, was located in the district.

== February Revolution ==
Prior to the February Revolution 1917, the area just south-west of the city boundary was known as the Petergofsky Police Sector (one of four such suburbs at the time), but by 1917 the name Narva Outpost (Нарвская застава) was also used.

A strike at one of the Putilov plant workshops sparked the protest movement that evolved into the February 26–27, 1917 armed insurrection (the February Revolution). In the midst of the revolution the workers of the Narva Outpost area Narva Outpost formed workers militia commissariats and the Narvsky Soviet of Workers Deputies. The Narvsky Soviet, which was active by March 6, 1917 or earlier, covered the geographic areas of the former Petergofsky and Narvsky sectors. Since the Putilov plant had such a dominating role in the life of the area, the Narvsky Soviet became highly involved in the internal affairs of the factory. According to Smith (1983) the Menshevik and non-partisan majority in the Narvsky Soviet sought to avoid having a separate Putilov plant committee, fearing that such a committee could form a rival power centre. Moreover, the Narvsky Soviet and the workers militia under its control were actively involved with issues of public order – confronting drunkenness, gambling and hooliganism in the area.

On March 28, 1917 the Narvsky Soviet held a joint meeting with three subdistrict Soviets from the former Narvsky Sector, at which it was decided to create separate Petergofsky and Narvsky districts. The ertswhile Narvsky Soviet was rebranded as the Petergofsky District Soviet. The Narvsky and Petergofsky District Soviets continued to hold two joint meetings in April 1917, but from there onwards the two soviets operated separately. The seal of the Petergofsky District Soviet had the inscription 'February 27, 1917'.

== An industrial suburb ==
Although the Petergofsky and Narvsky districts were now formally separated, in popular jargon people at the time would still refer to the area as the 'Narvsky'. The Petergofsky District consisted of two subdistricts. Whilst the Putilov plant dominated the life of both subdistricts, one of the subdistricts was more industrial with Putilov, Til'mans and Langezipen factories within its borders and the other had more presence of white-collar employees and small commercial enterprises.

The Petergofsky District was bordered by the Tarakanovka river, the Baltic Railway Line, Ligovo village and the Gulf of Finland. There was a significant working-class presence in the area, the erstwhile Petergofsky Sector and the adjacent Narvsky Sector housed a fifth of all the working-class population of the greater Petrograd area (some 36,148 workers lived in the Petergofsky-Narvsky area, out of a total population of around 91,000). All in all, the economy of the local area was highly characterized by the Putilov plant, whose workforce had grown significantly since the beginning of World War I. By January 1, 1917 here were more than 24,000 workers at the Putilov plant. Another 5,000 people worked at the Putilov Shipyard. A third large factory in the area was the Tentelevsky Chemical Plant.

== District Soviet ==
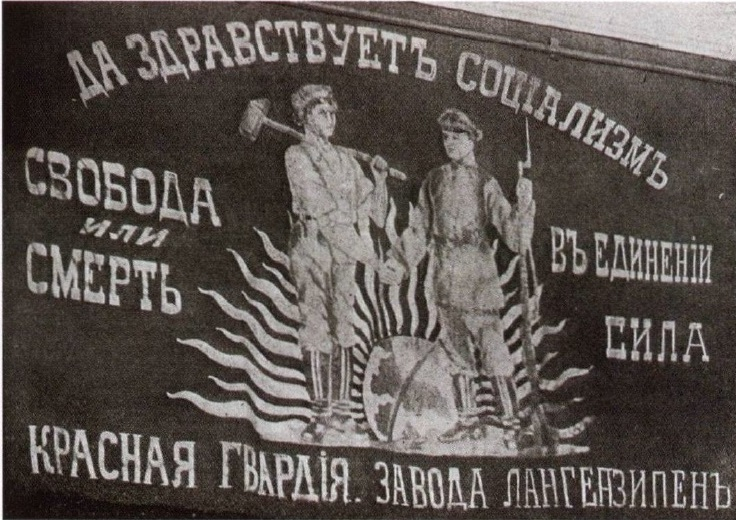
Banner of the Red Guards of the Langenzipen Factory

The Petergofsky District Soviet was politically heterogeneous, as a result of the presence of many different political factions at the Putilov plant. Whilst the Putilov workers had been on the forefront of the labour struggles of 1912–1914, the massive migration of peasants and urban lumpenproletariat to work at the Putilov plant with the beginning of World War I had changed the political dynamics of the local area. The Bolsheviks where the biggest faction among the Putilov workers, but there were also various different factions of anarchists or Socialist-Revolutionaries that enjoyed significant at the factory. Additionally there were small groups of Mensheviks – the United Mensheviks, Mezhraiontsy and Menshevik-Defencists. The Petergofsky District Soviet chairman was the Menshevik A. P. Kuzmin, whilst the Bolshevik A. Tsetkov-Prosveshensky served as its secretary.

Between April 10–14, 1917 elections to a Putilov Factory Committee was finally held, whereby the Petergofsky District Soviet could begin to dedicate itself more to political rather than industrial issues. The result of the Putilov Factory Committee was the election of 6 Bolsheviks, 6 non-partisans, 2 SRs, 1 Menshevik-Internationalist, 1 anarchist and 5 others of unclear political affiliation.

During the period between the February and October Revolutions of 1917, the political positions adopted by the Petergofsky District Soviet varied. In April 1917 it supported the decision of the Petrograd Soviet to organize Sunday labour for the war effort for May Day, a move the Bolsheviks denounced. On April 24–28, 1917 the Petergofsky District Soviet decided to organize Red Guards (becoming the second district in the Petrograd area to organize Red Guards, after the Vyborgsky District), but this decision was reversed on May 8–10 following a decision from the Petrograd Soviet. But on economic issues the Petergofsky District Soviet was more in line with the Bolsheviks – providing assistance to laundry workers on strike and seizing control over the G.G. Brenner Foundry and Mechanical Factory (a small copper-smelting and engineering plant which had closed by its owners in May 1917 and then taken over by a factory committee, the Petergofsky District Soviet decided to do an inventory and appointed a delegate to run the factory on June 16, 1917). And on June 8, 1917 the Petergofsky District Soviet adopted a resolution condemning repression against the Bolsheviks following events in Glukhovsky Uyezd.

The Petergofsky District was formally annexed to the city of Petrograd in the summer of 1917. The situation in Petrograd was dire, with recurring food shortages. When meat was delivered to restaurants in Petergofsky District, starving Putilov plant workers would go on rampage, looting shops and attacking members of the District Cooperative Society. The Petergofsky District Soviet and the Putilov Factory Committee intervened to quell the unrest.

By around July–August 1917, the Petergofsky District Soviet had gradually moved towards a largely Bolshevik line. The Bolshevik I. G. Egorov became the new chairman of the Petergofsky District Soviet. During the July Days the Petergofsky District Soviet sided with the Bolsheviks and rejected the instruction to disarm the working class organs of power. A new Executive Committee of the Petergofsky District Soviet was elected on July 7, 1917, using proportional representation whereby the Bolsheviks won two out of five seats. The workers militia of the Petergofsky District Soviet was disarmed. But whilst the Bolsheviks could not control the Executive Committee nor have a majority of the deputies of the District Soviet, they could control the general assembly of the Petergofsky District Soviet and thereby steer the district governance politically.

== Duma election ==
In August 1917, elections to the Petrograd City Duma were held. The results were announced on August 23, 1917 – the Bolsheviks got 17,254 votes (61.5%) in Petergofsky District, the SRs 8,807 votes (31.4%), the Kadets 964 votes (3.4%), Mensheviks 459 votes (1.6%), Unity 164 votes (0.6%), Popular Socialists 104 votes (0.4%). In the Petergofsky District Duma, the Bolsheviks and Left SRs formed a majority. As of October 1917 the District Duma chairman was the Socialist-Revolutionary B. O. Fleckel, whilst the Bolsheviks held the posts of vice chairman (V. I. Nevsky), secretary (V. P. Alekseev) and head of the District Administration (D. F. Mitrokhin). The Bolsheviks Pavel Lebedev (Polyansky) and Dmitry Manuilsky worked in the District Administration.

== Kornilov affair ==
During the September 1917 Kornilov affair, the Petergofsky District Soviet set up a revolutionary committee (one of the first soviets to do so) and organized Red Guards. On September 10 [O.S. August 28] 1917 Korgachin was named commander of the Petergofsky District Red Guards. In the morning of September 11 [O.S. August 29] 1917 the Petergofsky District Soviet called for general workers assemblies. At the gatherings the Petergofsky District Soviet representative and Putilov Factory Committee presented reports about the Kornilov actions. The workers reaffirmed the readiness to combat the counter-revolutionary coup attempt. The Petergofsky Central Revolutionary Committee consisted of three representatives from the Petergofsky District Soviet, five representatives from party organizations (one for each party organization), three representatives from district commissariats (one for each commissariat), one representative each from the Putilov Factory Committee, the Putilov docks, the District Board, the soldiers of the company based at the Putilov plant, the District Trade Union Bureau and small enterprises in the Petergofsky District. There were some 5,000 Red Guards mobilized. On the instructions of the Petergofsky Central Revolutionary Committee, workers erected barricades at the southern entrances of the city in order to block Kornilov's troops at the city gates. Other units of the worker's militia were tasked with surveillance of rightist elements, defense of factories and maintaining public order. The Putilov workers received a significant amount of rifles and pistols from the stocks of the Peter and Paul Fortress.

== October Revolution ==
On November 7 [O.S. October 25] 1917 the Bolshevik I. G. Egorov was named commander of the Red Guards of Petergofsky District. During the October Revolution, the Petergofsky District workers blocked the southern entrances of the city, seized police commissariats and posts offices in Petergofsky District and took part in storming the Winter Palace. Up to 4,000 Putilov Plant Red Guards took part in defeating of the Kerensky–Krasnov uprising.

In the 1917 Russian Constituent Assembly election the Bolsheviks received 28,754 votes (68.08%) in the Petergofsky District, the SRs 7,901 votes (18.71%), the Kadets 2,770 votes (6.56%), Catholics 653 votes (1.55%), Orthodox 449 votes (1.18%), Menshevik-Defencists 353 votes (0.84%), United Mensheviks 261 votes (0.62%), 176 votes (0.42%) the Independent Union of Workers, Soldiers and Peasants, 159 votes (0.38%) for the Women's League, 153 votes (0.36%) for the Popular Socialists, 144 votes (0.34%) for the (Orthodox) Christian Democrats, 126 votes (0.30%) for the SR Defencists, 74 votes (0.18%) for the Ukrainians, 69 votes (0.16%) for the Cossacks, 20 votes (0.05%) for Unity, 12 votes (0.03%) for the Women's Union for the Motherland, 8 votes (0.02%) for the Radical Democrats, 7 votes (0.02%) for the People's Development League and 5 votes (0.01%) for the Socialists-Universalists. The Bolshevik share of votes was the highest among all districts in Petrograd (albeit lower than in the military urns, where the Bolsheviks obtained 76.95% of the cast votes).

In November 1917 the Bolshevik S. M. Korgachin became the new chairman of the Petergofsky District Soviet. During November–December 1917 the Petergofsky District Soviet took various decisions to set up new organs of soviet power. Rather than forming a District Executive Committee, it set up a District Council of Commissars. On November 4, 1917 the Petergofsky District Soviet issued a resolution setting up revolutionary collegial courts. On December 14, 1917 the Petergofsky District Duma announced a strike by its members and employees, the District Duma was dissolved on the same day. The Petergofsky District Soviet held a general meeting, which resolved to hold new elections for a district duma in the near future. A Bolshevik deputy of the District Soviet was named as commissar in charge of the administration of the district. Workers of the Petergofsky District joined the Second Combined Detachment of the Red Guards, which was sent to the Southern Front in December 1917.

The Petergofsky District Soviet seized some residential properties and imposed rent controls. However according to a September 1918 report in Izvestiya Petrogradskogo Soveta the Petergofsky District housing department was ineffective. The newspaper reported that in Petergofsky District 185,000 rubles had been collected in rents whilst expenditures of the housing department reached 430,000 rubles in the same period. The Petergofsky District Soviet had seized a Sheremetev family villa, but lost most of the valuable furniture inside when the villa was raided by soldiers.

In February 1918 the Petergofsky District Soviet decided to set up its own military section, to work closely with the local Red Guards headquarters for recruitment to the Red Army. Between February and August 1918 more than twenty combat military units were organized from the Petergofsky District and the Putilov plant, such as the Putilov-Yurevsky Partisan Detachment, the First Red Workers and Peasants Putilov Socialist Regiment and the Putilov Steel Artillery Division. All in all, some 20,000 people from the district joined the Red Army.

In the wake of the July 6–7, 1918 Left SR uprising, the Executive Committee of the Petergofsky District Soviet held a meeting without the Left SR members, and decided to ban all Left SRs for positions in the soviet organs and called on the Left SRs to disarm. Left SRs were replaced by Bolsheviks in the Soviet. Around this time a meeting of hundreds of Putilov plant workers was held, protesting the suppression of the Left SRs, demanding the release of jailed Left SRs and the reopening of their press organs. On July 14, 1918 the Petergofsky District Soviet was convened with the participation of the Left SR deputies to the Soviet. The July 14, 1918 meeting endorsed the decision of the Executive Committee to expel the Left SRs.

== Merger with Narvsky District ==
In 1919 the Petergofsky District was merged with the Narvsky District, creating the Narvsko-Petergofsky District.
