= Pyotr Vershigora =

Soviet Ukrainian partisan leader (1905–1963)

- Петро Петрович Вершигора
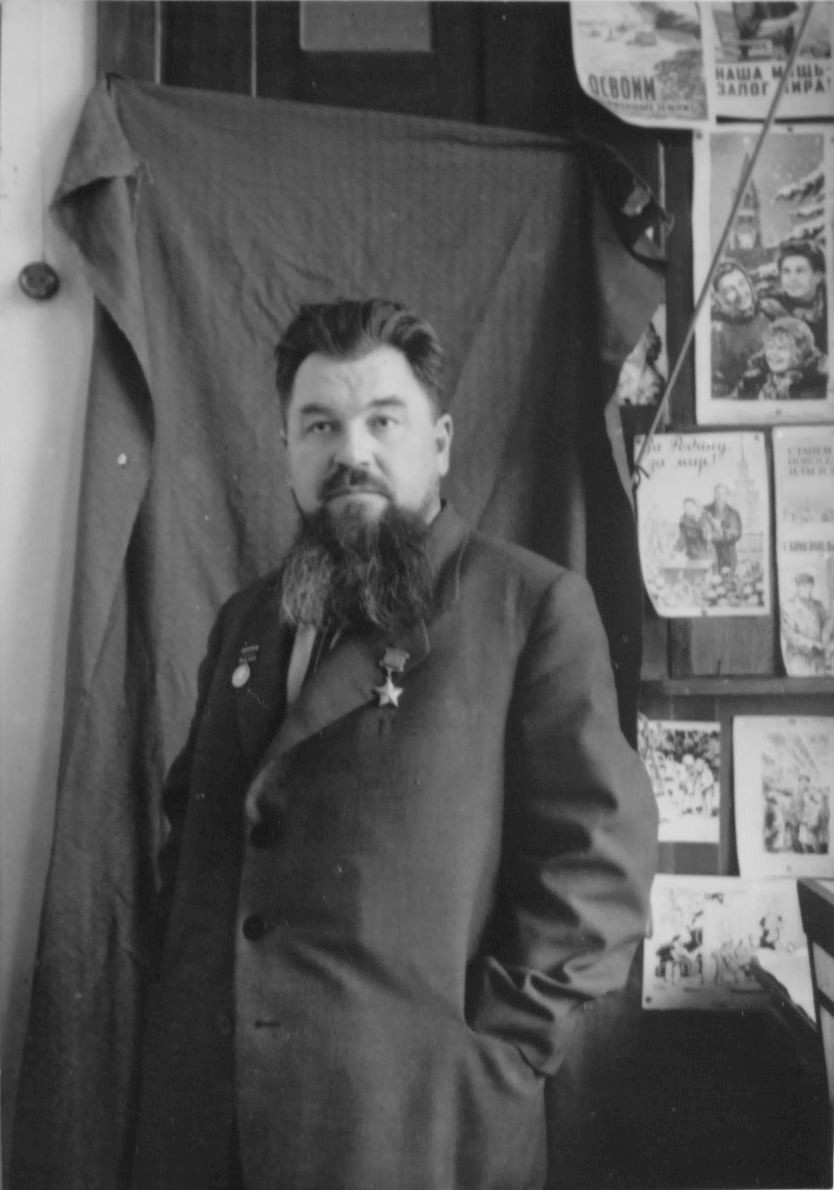
- Vershigora after receiving the title Hero of the Soviet Union in 1944
- Born: 16 May 1905; Severinovka, Podolia Governorate, Russian Empire (now Transnistria, Moldova)
- Died: 23 March 1963 (aged 57); Holercani, Moldavian SSR, Soviet Union (now Moldova)
- Military career
- Allegiance: Soviet Union
- Branch: Partisans
- Service years: 1941–1945
- Rank: Major general
- Commands: 1st Ukrainian Partisan Division
- Conflicts: World War II; Eastern Front

Pyotr Petrovich Vershigora (first name also Petr) (Russian: Пётр Петро́вич Верши́гора) or Petro Petrovych Vershyhora (Ukrainian: Петро Петрович Вершигора) (16 May [O.S. 3 May] 1905 – 23 March 1963) was one of the leaders of the Soviet partisan movement in Ukraine, Belarus and Poland and later a writer.

Petro Vershigora was born in the village of Severinovca near the Transnistrian town of Rîbnița. His parents were ethnic Ukrainian teachers at the local rural school, who died during his childhood. As a young orphan he worked at various jobs, including shepherd, miller, and librarian, as well as amateur actor and musician in his native village. In 1927, after completing his conscript military service, he enrolled in the Odessa Fine Arts Academy and upon graduation worked as an actor and stage manager.

In 1936 Vershigora completed his studies at cinema school and worked on several documentary films with the Kiev cinematographic company. Following the German invasion of the Soviet Union, he joined the Red Army. On 23 June 1942 he was air dropped on a reconnaissance mission in the German-occupied Oryol region with orders to join the underground resistance movement there.

Within a few months Vershigora joined the partisan units led by Sydir Kovpak in northeastern Ukraine. After the death of Semyon Rudnev in the summer of 1943, he became Kovpak's right-hand man and the head of his scouting and reconnaissance elements. Under his leadership, the 1st Ukrainian Partisan Division raided German-occupied western Belarus and eastern Poland, harassing the German rear. On 3 July 1944 they joined the regular Soviet army that was fighting to expel German forces from Belarus. In August 1944, after three years of fighting, Vershigora was promoted to the rank of major general.

After the war Vershigora taught at the military academy in Moscow and wrote a number of books, including Lyudi s chistoi sovestyu (People with a Clear Conscience, 1947), his memoirs about the war.

== Honours and awards ==
- Hero of the Soviet Union
- Two Orders of Lenin
- Order of the Red Banner
- Order of Bogdan Khmelnitsky 1st class
- Medal "Partisan of the Patriotic War" 1st class
- Medal "For the Victory over Germany in the Great Patriotic War 1941–1945"
