= Battles of Spadshchansky forest =

1941 German-Soviet military encounters

Battles of Spadshchansky Forest
- Part of the Eastern Front of World War II and German anti-partisan operations
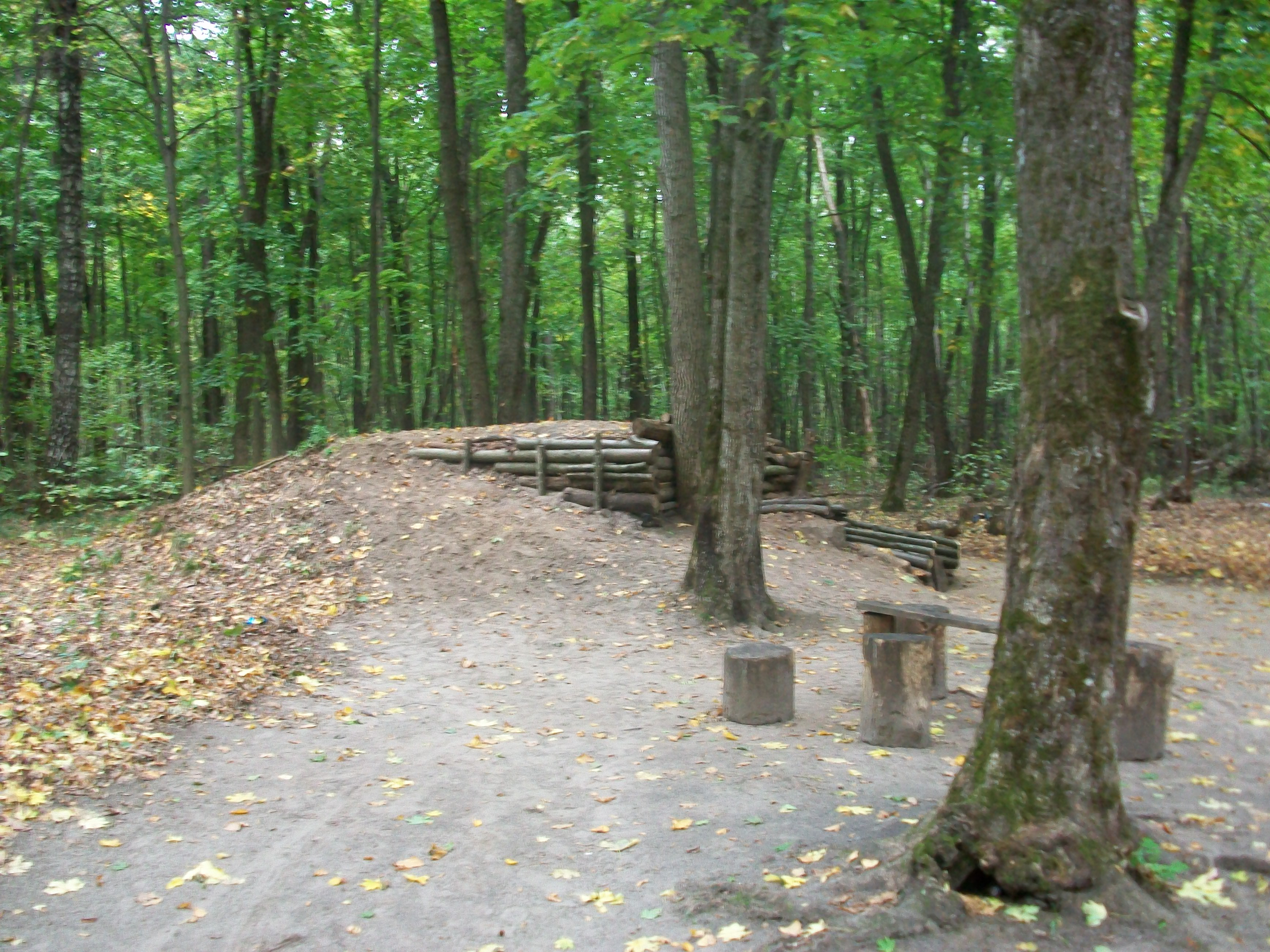
- Partisan dugout in Spadshchansky Forest
Date	19 October – November 1941
Location	Spadshchansky Forest, near Putyvl, Sumy Oblast, German-occupied Ukraine
Result	Soviet victory

Belligerents
Soviet Union	Germany

Commanders and leaders
Sidor Kovpak; Semyon Rudnev	Unknown

Units involved
Ukrainian partisans: Putyvl partisans	Wehrmacht Security

Strength
October: 57; November: 73; 1 tank	October 19: 5 tanks November: 3,000+

Casualties and losses
October 19: None; November: 3 killed	October 19: 10+ killed 2 tanks destroyed 3 tanks captured November: 200+ killed

The Battles of Spadshchansky Forest took place during German punitive expeditions into the forest in order to liquate Soviet partisan holdout, on 19 October – November 1941.

== Prelude ==
In September, Sidor Kovpak and Semyon Rudnev fled to the forest, where they organised their partisan detachments after German forces occupied Sumy region. These partisan detachments organised numerous raid and sabotage actions against German forces in the Sumy region. One such action resulted in the death of 6 Germans during October, among which were 2 generals after the two cars they were blown up. Actions of the Soviet partisans prompted Walther von Brauchitsch to issue an anti-partisan strategy, which was signed by Wilhelm Keitel. Kovpak was aware that soon the German forces were going to assault Spadshchansky forest, which sought him to seek alliances with other partisan detachments. On 18 October, Kovpak managed to unite with other detachments, which included Rudov detachment. These group were unified into one Putyvl partisan detachment.

== Battles ==
=== October fighting ===
On 19 October, partisans detected 2 German tanks approaching from Putyvl. German tanks advanced towards the partisan dugouts and shelled the house where commanders were stationed, but the commanders left on time. Sidor Kovpak ordered to mine the exit from the forest, while Kovpak himself with Rudnev and other commanders went into battle. The environment turned out to be advantageous to the partisans and German tanks were bugged down. Partisans eliminated the driver of the first tank, while the crew of another tank managed to flee. One of the enemy tanks attempting to get out of the forest blew up on the mine, out which partisans recovered 9 enemy corpses. Later, another German tank blew up on the mine. Partisans looted the remaining material of defeated German punitive detachment. Three German tanks were captured. Kovpak joyously described the victory of his unit in their first battle:

In short, a complete victory - and what a victory! The first battle - we did not have a scratch and an almost serviceable tank was captured. The excitement is great. Everyone definitely wants to climb into the tank, but there is nowhere to go - there is a lot there...

On 20 October, Germans renewed their offensive, this time supported by 12 trucks of infantry, 5 tanks and tankettes, which were attacking from multiple directions. Partisans were aware of this. Two partisan groups took defensive positions on forest heights, while German forces fired aimlessly. As the German force was advancing, two of their tanks blew up on the mines. Partisans took advantage of the confusion this caused among German infantry, opening fire on them. The battle lasted for two hours, resulting in retreat of the German punitive expedition.

On 27 October, Putyvl detachment was now a lot more organised, seizing the banner and looting all sorts of ammunition out of another blown up German tank.

=== November fighting ===
In November (early December according to another version), 73 partisans were forced to engage in battle with the German punitive force of over 3,000 in the forest. According to Kovpak himself, this was the most intense battle they had in the forest, which would've resulted in their complete demise had they failed. However, partisans managed to hold out. Germans were defeated and left behind dozens of dead in a hasty retreat. In total, Germans lost around 200 troops in battle. Partisans seized 5 machine guns and 20 rifles. Only time Kovpak mentioned Jews in his archives was in the form of an observation of the Jewish partisan from his unit, who was a gunner during this battle:

The Germans came up so near to [one of the tanks they had captured] ... that the faces of the soldiers could be seen. The tank met the Germans with fire, they scattered, ran away, reassembled, again went into the attack and once more retreated, leaving the dead whom our tank-gunner, thrusting his head out of the hatch after the firing, counted one by one with his fingers. I cannot remember his name — it was one that nobody could pronounce. Everyone called him by his first name, Abram, or simply Gunner.

== Aftermath ==
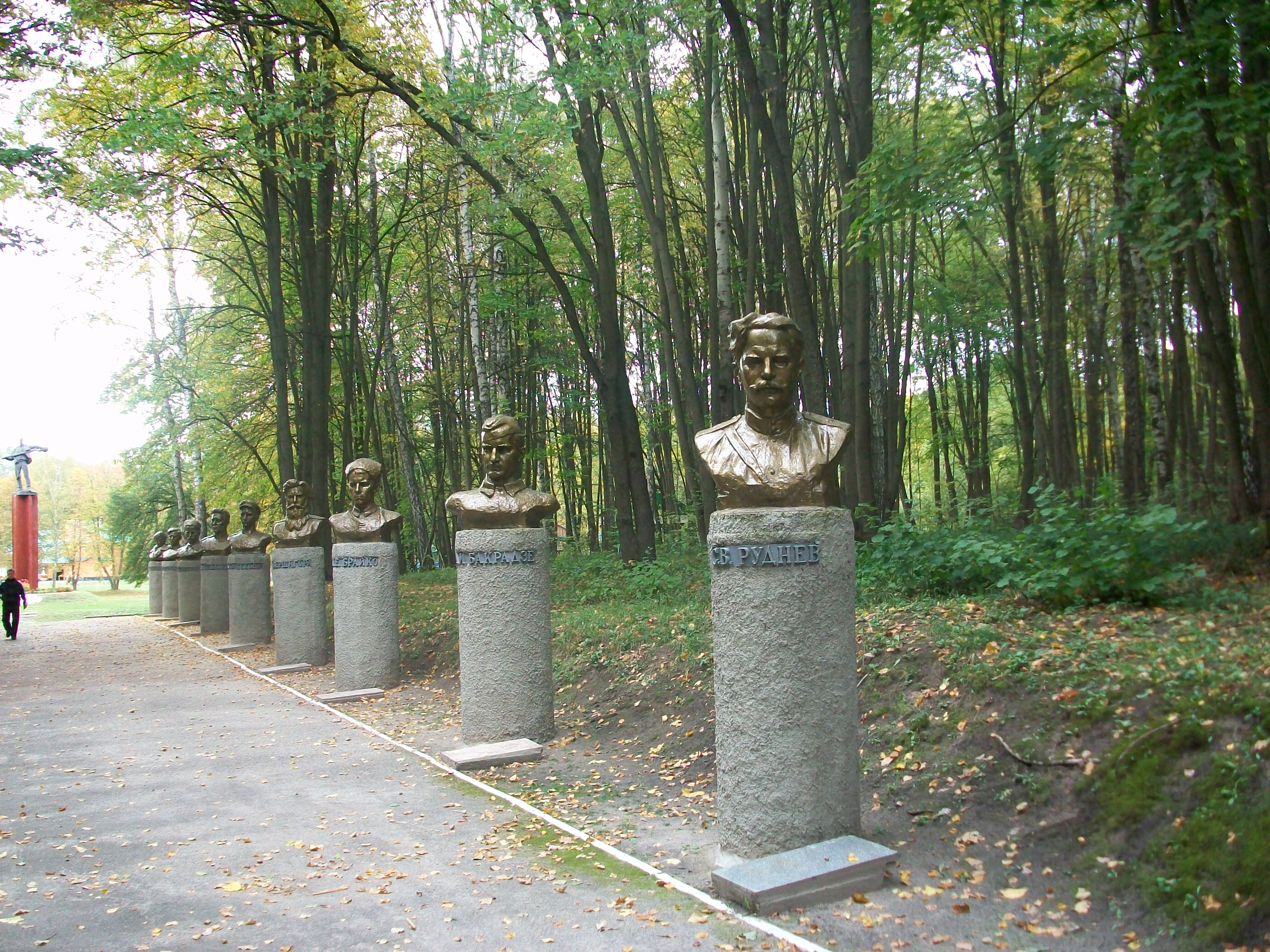
Eneterance into Spadshchansky Forest, where a museum was established.

Soviet partisans were victorious, but decided to withdraw to the north into Bryansk forest as they were running low on ammunition. Kovpak made his declaration on the withdrawal for 1 December: "In order to preserve the personnel for further battles, it was deemed expedient to leave Spadshchansky forest (hideout) at 24.00 hs, 1 Dec. 41, and to sally forth on a raid in the direction of the Bryansk forests". Before withdrawing, partisans buried three of their fallen fighters (Ilyin, Chelyadin, and Vorobyov), whose death the remaining 70 partisans and their commanders honored, buried in the place where Germans couldn't desecrate these graves.

== Legacy ==
In 1965, a museum honoring exploits of the Sumy partisans in the Spadshchansky Forest was established northwest of Putyvl.

== Bibliography ==
- Levine, A. Gerald (1998). Fugitives of the Forest. Stoddart Pub. ISBN 077373127X.
- Dixon; Heilbrunn, C. Aubrey.; Otto (2012). Communist Guerilla Warfare. Literary Licensing, LLC. ISBN 1258489244.
- Гладков; Кизя, Т. К.; Л. Е. (1973). Ковпак. Серия: Жизнь замечательных людей (in Russian). Moscow: Молодая гвардия.
