= Capture of Putyvl =

May 1942 military operation

- Part of the Eastern Front of World War II and German anti-partisan operations
Date	26 May 1942
Location	Putyvl, Konotop Raion, Sumy Oblast, German-occupied Ukraine
Result	Soviet victory
Territorial changes	Temporary occupation of Putyvl until 28 May

Belligerents
Ukrainian partisans	Germany; Hungary

Commanders and leaders
Sidor Kovpak; Semyon Rudnev	Unknown

Strength
750	Unknown, more than partisans

Casualties and losses
Unknown	Unknown, many deserted 300–370 killed

The Capture of Putyvl took place during operations of the Soviet partisans against German-Hungarian forces, on 26 May 1942.

== Prelude ==
After intense fighting in April between the German forces and Soviet partisans, Germans were weakened and the partisan path out of the Bryansk forest into Sumy Oblast was now open. On May 10, partisans tricked Hungarian and German forces into fighting one another, as a result mistaking each other for partisans. Partisans passed through Kamenka settlement and engaged in battle with German police, who lost 50 men during battle with partisans. On May 21, partisans blew up a railway bridge on the Yamiol-Makov section and the horse-drawn bridge on the Glukhov-Makov road, as ordered to them by the Soviet command.

Partisans were stationed in the forest and observed Putyvl, which was surrounded by other settlements, guarded by the German-Hungarian garrisons. Partisan units were outnumbered and outgunned, but Kovpak relied on the element of surprise and speed for his planned attack.

== Capture ==
On May 26, partisans launched an offensive towards Putyvl, during a rainy night. Hungarian unit approached Kleven village, where they were taken by surprise in a partisan attack. Hungarian units in the Vyazenki and Yatsyno settlements were also taken by surprise and forced to retreat. Hungarians withdrew to Staraya Sharpovka settlement, where another partisan attack took place. By the morning, partisans cleared all settlements where the fighting took place. Hungarians lost 300–370 troops in these battles.

All the roads to Putyvl were cleared as a result of partisan actions. German police and soldiers were taken by complete surprise, believing a much bigger force was heading for them, which made the Germans desert their outposts.

== Aftermath ==
The capture of Putyvl was like a birthday gift for Sidor Kovpak. Komsomol member Alexander Turaev was temporarily appointed as commandant of the city. On 27 May, Luftwaffe bombed partisan-occupied Putyvl. On May 28, German forces attacked the city with armoured support in order to retake it, but the partisans already withdrew into Spadshchansky forest by the time German troops arrived.

Kovpak unified partisan units during temporary occupation of the city, planning to conduct railway sabotage operations. The temporary occupation of Putyvl by partisans was humiliating for the German command, so they ordered to launch attacks into Spadshchansky forest. German forces launched three unsuccessful attacks into the forest, which led to heavy losses in attempts to get rid of partisans.

== Bibliography ==
- Гладков; Кизя, Т. К.; Л. Е. (1973). Ковпак. Серия: Жизнь замечательных людей (in Russian). Moscow: Молодая гвардия.
- Kovpak, Sidor (1945). От Путивля до Карпат (in Russian). Детская літаратура.
