= Sydir Kovpak =

WWII Soviet-Ukrainian resistance leader

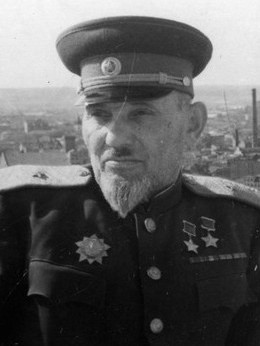

Deputy Chairman of the Supreme Soviet of the Ukrainian SSR
- In office 9 February 1947 – 11 April 1967
- Chairman: Oleksandr Korniychuk Pavlo Tychyna

Personal details
- Born: June 7, 1887 Kotelva, Kharkov Governorate, Russian Empire
- Died: December 11, 1967 (aged 80) Kiev, Ukrainian SSR, Soviet Union
- Awards: Hero of the Soviet Union (twice); Cross of St. George (3rd, 4th Class); Medal of St. George (3rd, 4th Class); Order of Lenin (4 times); Order of Bogdan Khmelnitsky, 1st Class; Order of Suvorov, 2nd Class; Order of the Red Banner; Medal "Partisan of the Patriotic War", 1st class

Military service
- Allegiance: (Russia) Russian Empire; Soviet Union
- Years of service: 1914–1925; 1941–1945
- Rank: Major General
- Commands: Putyvl partisan detachment 1st Ukrainian Partisan Division; Allied partisan units
- Battles/wars: World War I; Brusilov Offensive; Kerensky Offensive; Russian Civil War; Buguruslansky Offensive; Belebeyskaya Offensive; Ufa Offensive; Kiev offensive; World War II; Battles of Spadshchansky Forest; Battle of Dubovychi; Battle of Veseloe; Capture of Putyvl
- Central institution membership: 1947–1967: 2nd, 3rd, 4th, 5th, 6th, 7th Supreme Soviet of the Ukrainian SSR; 1946–1967: 2nd, 3rd, 4th, 5th, 6th, 7th Supreme Soviet of the Soviet Union

Sydir Artemovych Kovpak (Ukrainian: Си́дір Арте́мович Ковпа́к; Russian: Си́дор Арте́мьевич Ковпа́к, romanized: Sidor Artemyevich Kovpak), (June 7, 1887 – December 11, 1967) led Soviet partisans in Ukraine from 1941 to 1944 during the Axis-Soviet War phase of World War II.

== Biography ==
Kovpak was born to a poor Ukrainian peasant family in Kotelva village in Kharkov Governorate, Russian Empire (in present-day Ukraine). Kovpak is of Zaporozhian Cossack descent. For his military service in World War I, he was awarded two Crosses of St. George personally by the Emperor Nicholas II of Russia (an award for exceptional military heroism). After the Russian Revolution he joined the All-Russian Communist Party (Bolsheviks) and fought for the Red Army partisan units against the German forces, as well as against Denikin's White Army in Vasily Chapayev's cavalry division. In the interwar period he was a head of the local government in the town of Putyvl, Sumy Oblast (province).

=== World War II ===
At the time of the German invasion of Soviet Ukraine partisan units led by Sydir Kovpak waged guerrilla warfare against Axis forces originally in partisan strongholds in Sumy and Bryansk regions but later its operation spread deep into German-occupied territory including Kyiv, Zhytomyr, Rivne, Homyel, Volyn and other regions. These partisan units also fought against the nationalist Ukrainian Insurgent Army. In 1944 partisans under Kovpak's leadership raided enemy forces throughout western Ukraine and Belarus and even reached Romanian border regions during the Carpathian raid inflicting heavy casualties on the Germans.

Kovpak mastered guerrilla tactics and was awarded Hero of the Soviet Union title twice (1942; 1944). In the summer of 1943 Germans managed to hunt down and kill Kovpak's second in command Semyon Rudnev who was replaced by a new right-hand man Petro Vershigora who would later become a writer and dedicate his books to Kovpak's underground resistance.

Sydir Kovpak was promoted to the rank of Major General in 1943. According to the memoirs of his lieutenant Vershigora, his promotion and General's stars were airdropped to his partisan unit's position deep behind the front lines. After the end of the Second World War Sydir Kovpak held key positions in the leadership of Soviet Ukraine, including Vice Chairman of the Supreme Court of Ukraine in 1947 and Supreme Soviet of Ukraine in 1967. He also was a member of the Supreme Soviet of the Soviet Union for the 2nd through 7th convocations.

== Books ==
- От Путивля до Карпат (From Putivl to the Carpathian Mountains), 1945, Voenizdat, 136 pages. Recorded by Evgenii Nikolaevich Gerasimov (1903-1986). English translation Vid Putivla do Karpat published by Politvydav Ukrainy, Kyiv, first print in 1973.
- Из дневника партизанских походов (From the diary of partisan marches), 1964, DOSAAF, Russian language, 220 pages.
- Воспоминания, очерки, статьи (Memoirs, essays, articles), 1987, Politvydav Ukrainy, Kyiv, Russian language, 388 pages.

== Movies ==
Kovpak was portrayed (by Konstantin Stepankov) in Soviet film trilogy Duma o Kovpake (Дума о Ковпаке, Poem of Kovpak):

- Duma o Kovpake: Nabat (Дума о Ковпаке: Набат, Poem of Kovpak: Alarm), 1973 – how initially small partisan unit of twelve people grew into large force under Kovpak and Rudnev.
- Duma o Kovpake: Buran (Дума о Ковпаке: Буран, Poem of Kovpak: Storm), 1975 – about actions in enemy rear in 1941–1942.
- Duma o Kovpake: Karpaty, Karpaty... (Дума о Ковпаке: Карпаты, Карпаты..., Poem of Kovpak: Carpathians, Carpathians...), 1976 – about the 1943 raid into the Carpathians.

A TV documentary Его звали ДЕД (He was called GRANDPA) (Ukrainian language, produced by TRK Era, director Oleksiy Barbaruk-Trypilsky, 36 min, screened in 2011) documents Kovpak's life during the war.

== See also ==
- One of the branches of Kovpak formation was at Torforazrabotki, in vicinity of Deptovka, Dmitrievka rayon, Chernigov oblast. This branch was a medical camp located deep in the woods of Chernigov oblast. The branch was hiding wounded partisans, caring for them until they could be evacuated to Bolshaya Zemlya by aircraft (U2). The commander of the camp was Naum Aronovich, which before the war was the director of Sovkhoz in Deptovka. The Doctor was Natalia Buseva, Feldsher was Claudia Buseva, several nurses from former Deptovka hospital. The camp functioned for 2.5 years until retreat of German troops in 1943.

== Bibliography ==
- Armstrong, John A. (1964). Soviet Partisans in World War II. Univ of Wisconsin Pr. ISBN 0299030601.
