= Glukhovsky Uyezd =

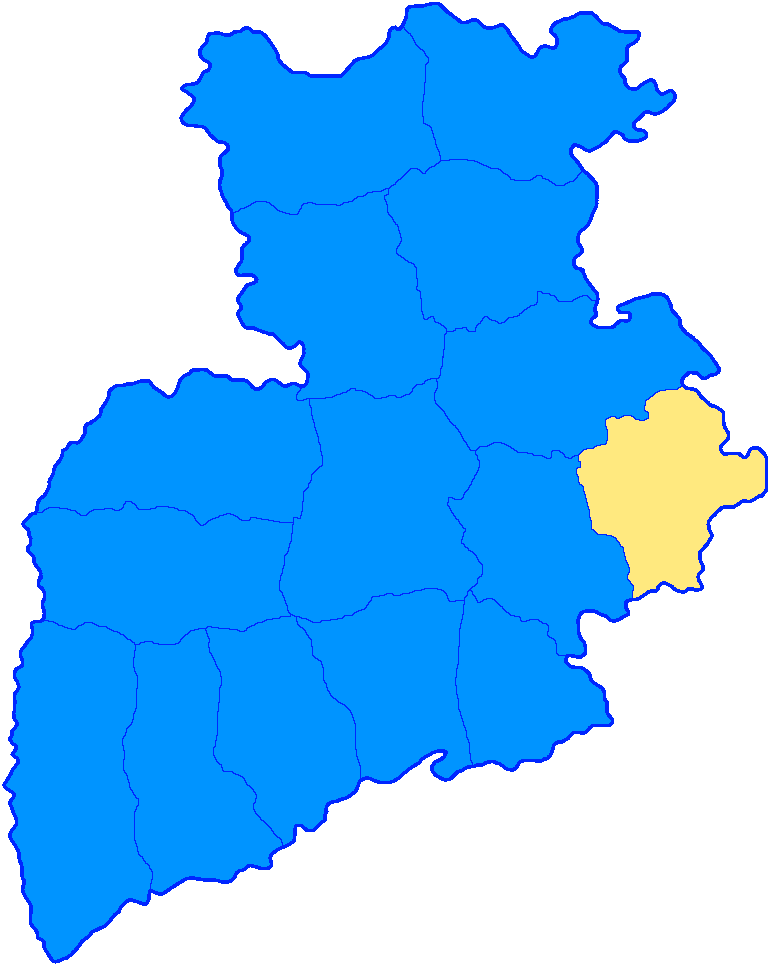
Glukhovsky district on the map of Chernigov province

Glukhovsky Uyezd (Russian: Глуховский уезд; Ukrainian: Глухівський повіт, romanized: Hlukhivskyi povit) was one of the subdivisions of the Chernigov Governorate of the Russian Empire. It was situated in the eastern part of the governorate. Its administrative centre was Hlukhiv (Russian Glukhov).

== Demographics ==
At the time of the Russian Empire Census of 1897, Glukhovsky Uyezd had a population of 142,661. Of these, 91.6% spoke Ukrainian, 4.2% Russian, 3.9% Yiddish, 0.1% Polish, 0.1% Belarusian and 0.1% Romani as their native language.
