= Semyon Rudnev =

WWII Soviet-Ukrainian resistance leader

Semyon Rudniev
- Native name: Семëн Васильевич Руднев
- Born: 27 February 1899; Moiseyevka village, Kursk Governorate, Putivlsky Uyezd, Russian Empire
- Died: 4 August 1943 (aged 44) Zarichchia, Nadvirna Raion, Stanislav Oblast, Ukrainian SSR, Soviet Union
- Allegiance: Soviet Union
- Service years: 1918-1943
- Rank: Major General
- Conflicts: October Revolution; Russian Civil War; World War II †; Battles of Spadshchansky Forest; Battle of Dubovychi; Battle of Veseloe (WIA); Capture of Putyvl
- Awards: Hero of the Soviet Union; Order of Lenin; Order of the Red Banner; Order of the Red Star; Order of the Badge of Honour

Semyon Vasilyevich Rudniev (Russian: Семён Васи́льевич Ру́днев; Ukrainian: Семе́н Васи́льович Ру́днєв, romanized: Semen Vasyliovych Rudniev) (February 27, 1899 – August 4, 1943) was one of the leaders of Soviet partisan movement during World War II and People's Commissar in the partisan group operating in Ukraine and led by Sydir Kovpak.

== Early life ==
Rudniev was born in a peasant family in what is now Sumy region. As a teenager Rudniev moved to Saint-Petersburg and became an apprentice carpenter at the Russo-Balt Factory. Rudniev became an active member of the Bolshevik movement and joined the party in March 1917. For distributing Bolshevik leaflets, Rudniev was sent to the Vyborg prison.

He participated in the assault on the Winter Palace during the October Revolution. In 1918, Rudniev joined the Red Army. At first, he served as a platoon commander, but later became secretary of party organization for the 373rd Rifle Regiment of the 42nd Rifle Division. He then became a commissar for the Donetsk Labour Army's political department. He then became assistant commissar of the 44th Rifle Regiment of the 15th Rifle Division. Rudniev fought on the Southern Front of the Russian Civil War.

== Interwar ==
In 1929, Rudniev graduated from the Lenin Military-Political Academy. He became commissar of the 61st Coastal Defence Antiaircraft Artillery Regiment in Sevastopol. In 1932 he was transferred to become commissar of the 9th Coastal Defence Artillery Brigade in the Far East. In July 1933, he became military commissar of the De-Kastri fortified area, then under construction. In August 1937, he was appointed commissar of the 1st Military Construction Brigade there. On 7 February 1938, he was arrested by the NKVD and in May 1939 charged with committing crimes under Article 58 of the RSFSR Penal Code, which carried the death penalty. Rudniev initially confessed to creating the Trotskyist organization in his fortified area but refused to confess to espionage and sabotage charges. He soon retracted his confession, stating that it was made under duress. In July 1939, his case was sent for review to the Military Collegium of the Supreme Court of the Soviet Union, but was then sent back to the military tribunal of the 2nd Red Banner Army. After a retrial, Rudniev was released from prison. He was soon discharged for health reasons and returned to Putyvl. In 1940, he became the chairman of the OSOAVIAKHIM district council.

== World War II ==
On 22 June 1941, German troops attacked the Soviet Union in Operation Barbarossa. They soon reached Ukraine and had reached Kiev by late August. In September, Rudniev formed a partisan group in Putyvl. In October, Rudniev and Sydir Kovpak's partisan detachment united into one unit, with Rudniev becoming commissar. He quickly gained respect among partisan fighters and remained Kovpak's commissar while their initially small group rose into a large well-organized formation raiding the rear of the Axis occupants. In the winter of 1942, Rudniev was wounded in battle near Vesyloye village. On April 9, 1943, Semyon Rudniev was promoted to the rank of major general.

According to official sources, Rudniev, recovering from a wound, committed gunshot suicide in a sudden German attack, in order to not be taken alive. The incident happened during the 4 August 1943 "Carpathian Raid" of Kovpak's partisan group and was witnessed at first hand only by a small group of his guards (mostly killed in that action). However, Glantz states that Rudniev was killed while the partisan group was withdrawing from an attack on Deliatyn. On 4 January 1944, Rudniev was posthumously awarded the title Hero of the Soviet Union and the Order of Lenin for bravery in the partisan battles.

In July 1946, a mass grave containing Rudniev's body was discovered in a forest near Deliatyn in Zarichchia. He was reburied in Yaremche.

== Legacy ==
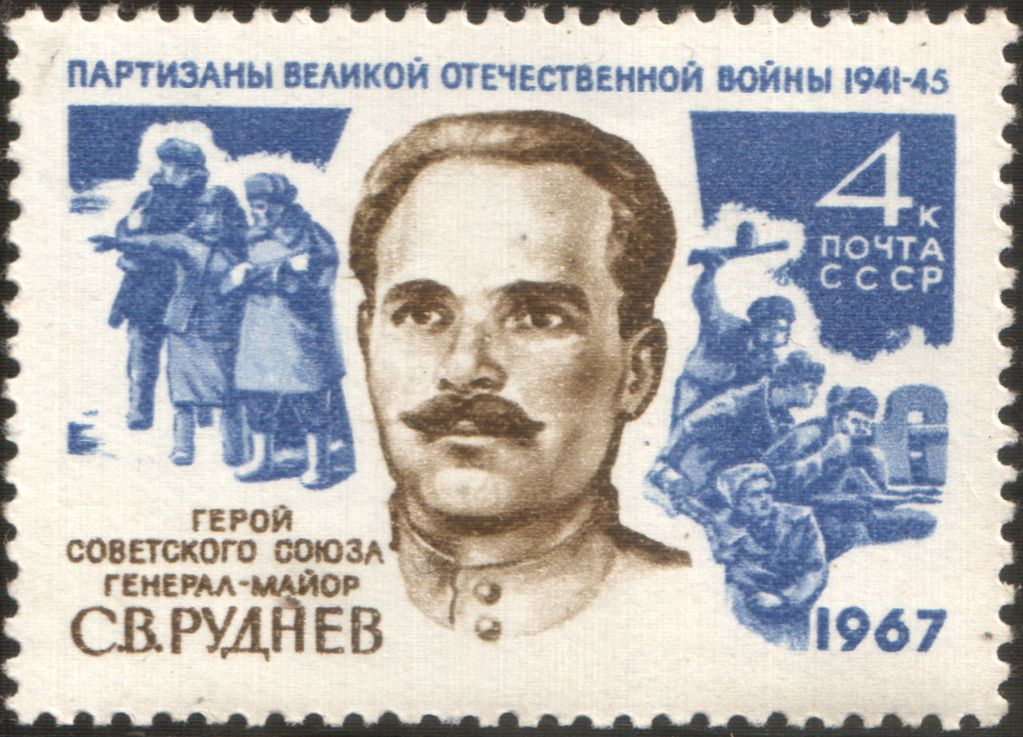
1967 Postage stamp honoring Rudniev

A monument to Rudniev was installed in Putyvl. Rudniev's home village of Moiseyevka became Rudnevo in his honor. The teacher's college in Putyvl was also named after Rudniev. In Deliatyn, a monument honoring Rudniev was also erected. In 1967, the Soviet Union issued a postage stamp in honor of Rudniev.

== Controversies ==
After the fall of the Soviet Union, some historians began questioning the official version of Rudniev's life and death. Basing on disclosed Soviet archives, some researchers alleged that Rudniev was not committed to strategy and approaches (especially regarding civilians) dictated by the Moscow-based Ukrainian Partisan Movement Headquarters (Ukrainian: Український Штаб Партизанського Руху, УШПР)). This supposedly caused Rudniev's conflicts with both Sydir Kovpak and high-ranked NKVD agent Ivan Siromolotnyi (the latter was interacting with Kovpak and Rudniev from Moscow over the radio). According to these researchers, Rudniev was attempting to collaborate with Ukrainian Insurgent Army forces.

This conflict is said to have caused Rudniev's mysterious death. Some studies suggest that Rudniev might have been assassinated by his personal radio operator, Anna Turkina (a woman trained in Moscow) by a direct order from Siromolotnyi. However, according to deputy head of the Ukrainian Institute of National Remembrance Dmitry Vedeneyev, this version of events is untrue.

== Honours and awards ==
- Hero of the Soviet Union
- Order of Lenin
- Order of the Red Banner
- Order of the Red Star
- Order of the Badge of Honour
- Medal "Partisan of the Patriotic War" 1st class
- Medal "Partisan of the Patriotic War" 2nd class
