= Dubovychi =

Dubovychi Дубовичі
- Rural settlement
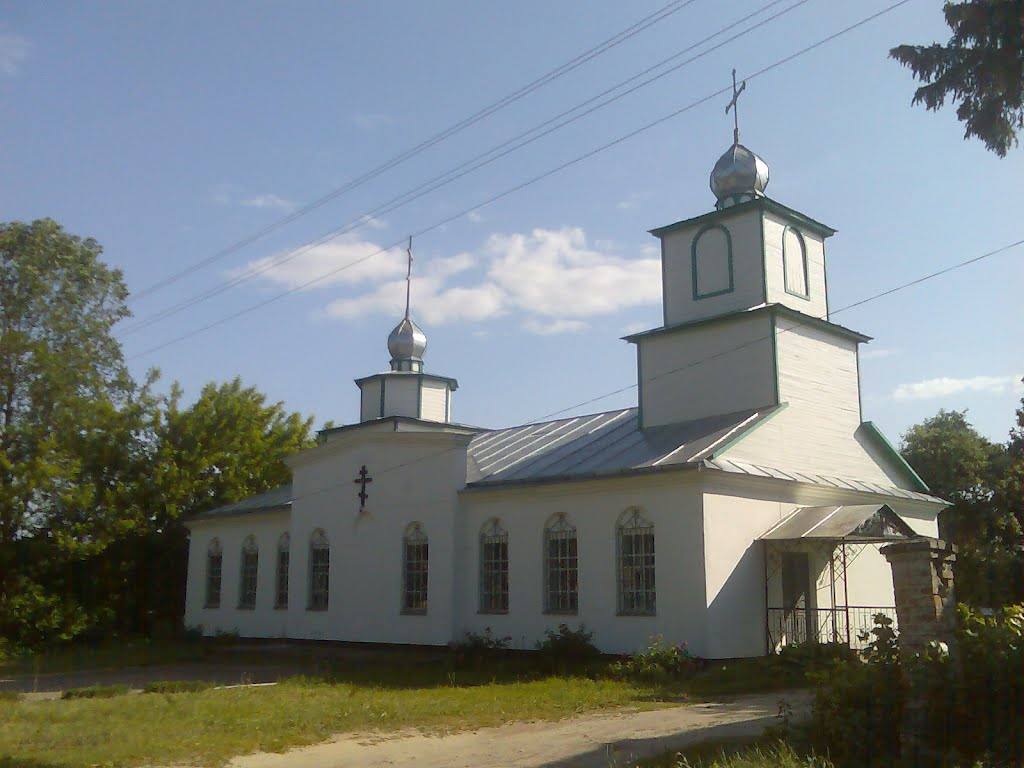

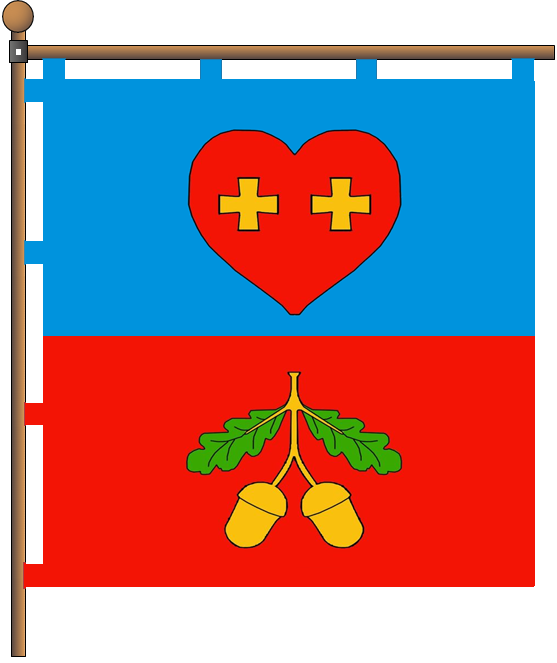
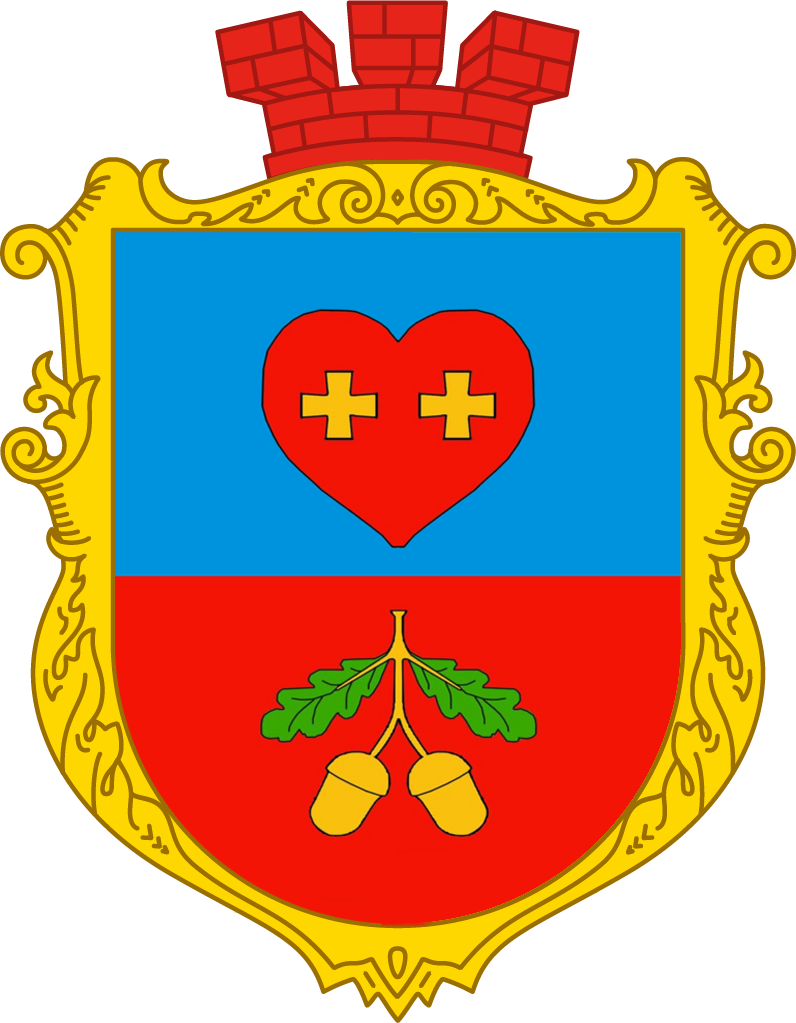
- Flag Coat of arms

- Location in Sumy Oblast Location in Ukraine
- Coordinates: 51°38′03″N 33°34′06″E
- Country: Ukraine
- Oblast: Sumy Oblast
- Raion: Konotop Raion
- Hromada: Krolevets urban hromada

Population
  - Total: ▼779
- Time zone: UTC+2 (EET)
  - Summer (DST): UTC+3 (EEST)

Dubovychi is a rural settlement in Ukraine, in Konotop Raion of Sumy Oblast. During the 2022 Russian invasion of Ukraine, a convoy of seventeen Russian vehicles passed through, shooting at civilians along the way.
