= Administrative divisions of Sumy Oblast =

Sumy Oblast is subdivided into districts (raions) which are subdivided into territorial communities (hromadas).

== Current ==
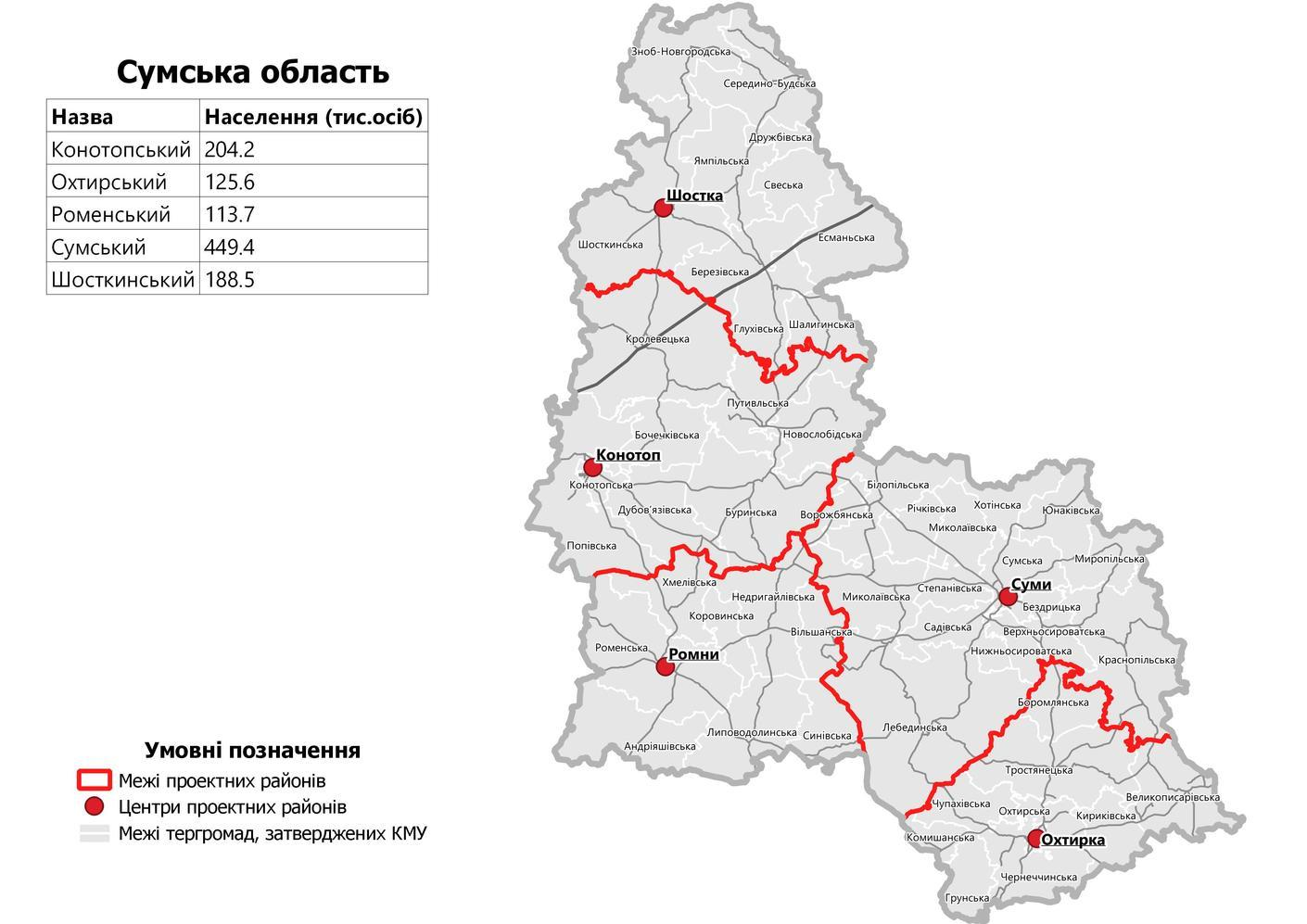
Raions of Sumy Oblast as of August 2020.

On 18 July 2020, the number of districts was reduced to five. These are:

1. Konotop (Конотопський район), the center is in the town of Konotop;
2. Okhtyrka (Охтирський район), the center is in the town of Okhtyrka;
3. Romny (Роменський район), the center is in the town of Romny;
4. Shostka (Шосткинський район), the center is in the town of Shostka;
5. Sumy (Сумський район), the center is in the city of Sumy.

**Sumy Oblast**
As of January 1, 2022
Number of districts (райони)	5
Number of hromadas (громади)	51

=== Communities (hromadas) per District (raion) ===
In bold are communities (hromadas) with cities

Konotop Raion

- Bochechky
- **Buryn**
- Dubovyazivka
- **Konotop**
- **Krolevets**
- Nova Sloboda
- Popivka
- **Putyvl**

Okhtyrka Raion

- Boromlia
- Chernechyna
- Chupakhivka
- Hrun
- Komyshi
- Kyrykivka
- **Okhtyrka**
- **Trostianets**
- Velyka Pysarivka

Romny Raion

- Andriyashivka
- Khmeliv
- Korovyntsi
- Lypova Dolyna
- Nedryhailiv
- **Romny**
- Synivka
- Vilshana

Shostka Raion

- Bereza
- Esman
- **Hlukhiv**
- **Khutir-Mykhailivskyi**
- **Seredyna-Buda**
- Shalyhyne
- **Shostka**
- Svesa
- Yampil
- Znob-Novhorodske

Sumy Raion

- Bezdryk
- **Bilopillia**
- Khotin
- Krasnopillia
- **Lebedyn**
- Mykolayivka settlement
- Mykolayivka village
- Myropillia
- Nyzhnia Syrovatka
- Richky
- Sad
- Stepanivka
- **Sumy**
- Verkhnia Syrovatka
- **Vorozhba**
- Yunakivka

== Administrative divisions until 2020 ==
Raions of Sumy Oblast. The city of Sumy is shown in dark blue.

Before 2020, Sumy Oblast was subdivided into 24 regions: 17 districts (raions) and 7 city municipalities (mis'krada or misto), officially known as territories governed by city councils.

- Cities under the oblast's jurisdiction:
  - Sumy Municipality
    - Cities and towns under the city's jurisdiction:
      - Sumy (Суми), the administrative center of the oblast
  - Hlukhiv Municipality
    - Cities and towns under the city's jurisdiction:
      - Hlukhiv (Глухів)
  - Konotop Municipality
    - Cities and towns under the city's jurisdiction:
      - Konotop (Конотоп)
  - Lebedyn Municipality
    - Cities and towns under the city's jurisdiction:
      - Lebedyn (Лебедин)
  - Okhtyrka Municipality
    - Cities and towns under the city's jurisdiction:
      - Okhtyrka (Охтирка)
  - Romny Municipality
    - Cities and towns under the city's jurisdiction:
      - Romny (Ромни)
  - Shostka (Шостка)
- Districts (raions):
  - Bilopillia (Білопільський район)
    - Cities and towns under the district's jurisdiction:
      - Bilopillia (Білопілля)
      - Vorozhba (Ворожба)
    - Urban-type settlements under the district's jurisdiction:
      - Mykolaivka (Миколаївка), formerly Zhovtneve
      - Ulianivka (Улянівка)
  - Buryn (Буринський район)
    - Cities and towns under the district's jurisdiction:
      - Buryn (Буринь)
  - Hlukhiv (Глухівський район)
    - Urban-type settlements under the district's jurisdiction:
      - Esman (Есмань), formerly Chervone
      - Shalyhyne (Шалигине)
  - Konotop (Конотопський район)
    - Urban-type settlements under the district's jurisdiction:
      - Duboviazivka (Дубов'язівка)
  - Krasnopillia (Краснопільський район)
    - Urban-type settlements under the district's jurisdiction:
      - Krasnopillia (Краснопілля)
      - Uhroidy (Угроїди)
  - Krolevets (Кролевецький район)
    - Cities and towns under the district's jurisdiction:
      - Krolevets (Кролевець)
  - Lebedyn (Лебединський район)
  - Lypova Dolyna (Липоводолинський район)
    - Urban-type settlements under the district's jurisdiction:
      - Lypova Dolyna (Липова Долина)
  - Nedryhailiv (Недригайлівський район)
    - Urban-type settlements under the district's jurisdiction:
      - Nedryhailiv (Недригайлів)
      - Terny (Терни)
  - Okhtyrka (Охтирський район)
    - Urban-type settlements under the district's jurisdiction:
      - Chupakhivka (Чупахівка)
  - Putyvl (Путивльський район)
    - Cities and towns under the district's jurisdiction:
      - Putyvl (Путивль)
  - Romny (Роменський район)
  - Seredyna-Buda (Середино-Будський район)
    - Cities and towns under the district's jurisdiction:
      - Seredyna-Buda (Середина-Буда)
    - Urban-type settlements under the district's jurisdiction:
      - Znob-Novhorodske (Зноб-Новгородське)
  - Shostka (Шосткинський район)
    - Urban-type settlements under the district's jurisdiction:
      - Voronizh (Вороніж)
  - Sumy (Сумський район)
    - Urban-type settlements under the district's jurisdiction:
      - Khotin (Хотінь)
      - Nyzy (Низи)
      - Stepanivka (Степанівка)
  - Trostianets (Тростянецький район)
    - Cities and towns under the district's jurisdiction:
      - Trostianets (Тростянець)
  - Velyka Pysarivka (Великописарівський район)
    - Urban-type settlements under the district's jurisdiction:
      - Kyrykivka (Кириківка)
      - Velyka Pysarivka (Велика Писарівка)
  - Yampil (Ямпільський район)
    - Cities and towns under the district's jurisdiction:
      - Druzhba (Дружба)
    - Urban-type settlements under the district's jurisdiction:
      - Svesa (Свеса)
      - Yampil (Ямпіль)
