= List of cities in Sumy Oblast =

Location of cities in Sumy Oblast

There are 15 populated places in Sumy Oblast, Ukraine, that have been officially granted city status (Ukrainian: місто, romanized: misto) by the Verkhovna Rada, the country's parliament. Settlements with more than 10,000 people are eligible for city status, although the status is typically also granted to settlements of historical or regional importance. As of 5 December 2001, the date of the first and only official census in the country since independence, (Note: As of 11 July 2023) the most populous city in the oblast was the regional capital, Sumy, with a population of 293,141 people, while the least populous city was Khutir-Mykhailivskyi, with 5,726 people. In 2024, following the passage of derussification laws, the city of Druzhba was renamed Khutir-Mykhailivskyi. For their contributions to the country's defense during the Russian invasion, three cities in the oblast were awarded with the honorary title Hero City of Ukraine: Okhtyrka in 2022, and Sumy and Trostianets in 2025.

From independence in 1991 to 2020, seven cities in the oblast were designated as cities of regional significance (municipalities), which had self-government under city councils, while the oblast's remaining eight cities were located amongst seventeen raions (districts) as cities of district significance, which are subordinated to the governments of the raions. On 18 July 2020, an administrative reform abolished and merged the oblast's raions and cities of regional significance into five new, expanded raions. The five raions that make up the oblast are Konotop, Okhtyrka, Romny, Shostka, and Sumy.

== List of cities ==
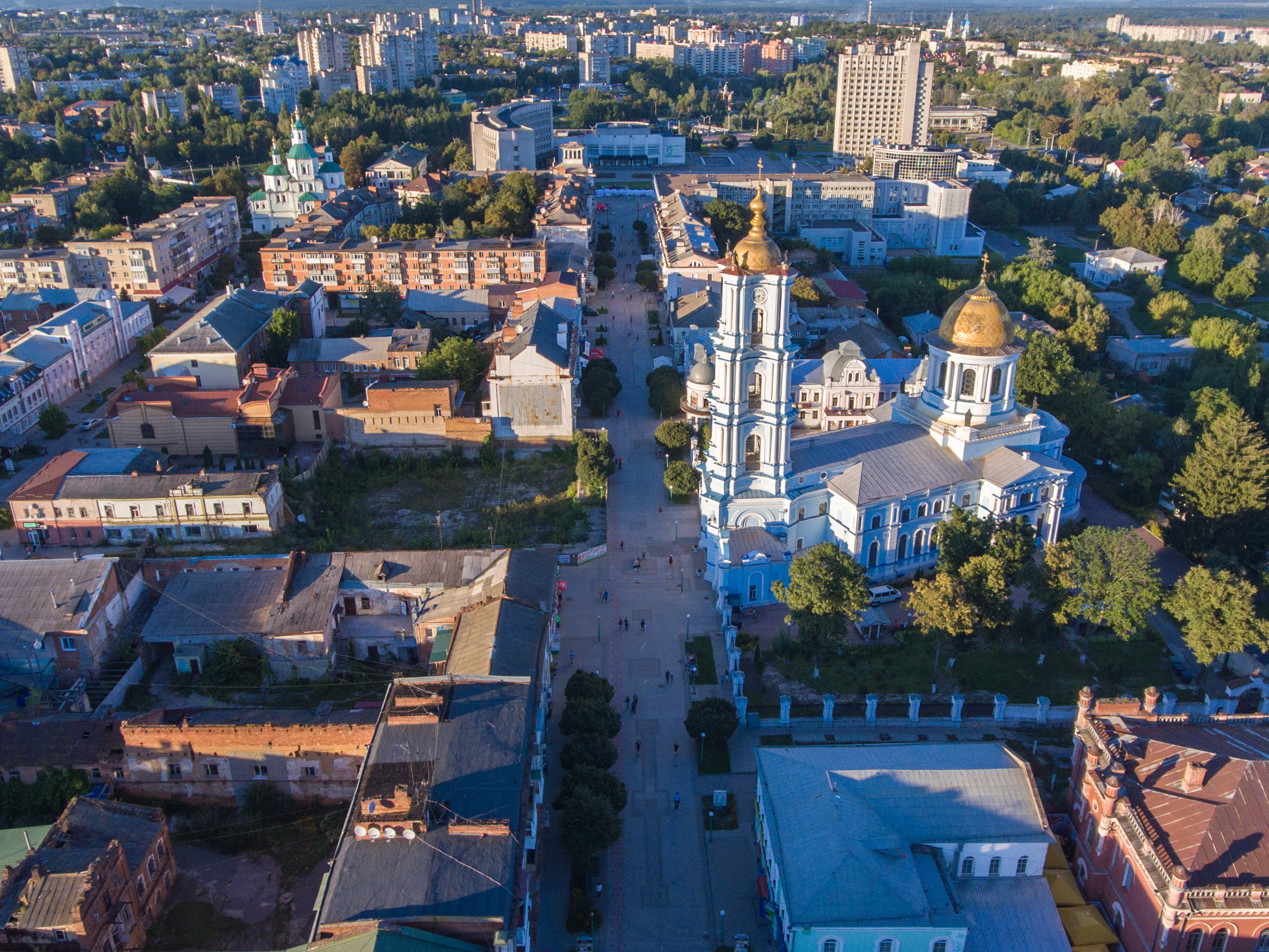
Sumy, capital and most populous city in Sumy Oblast

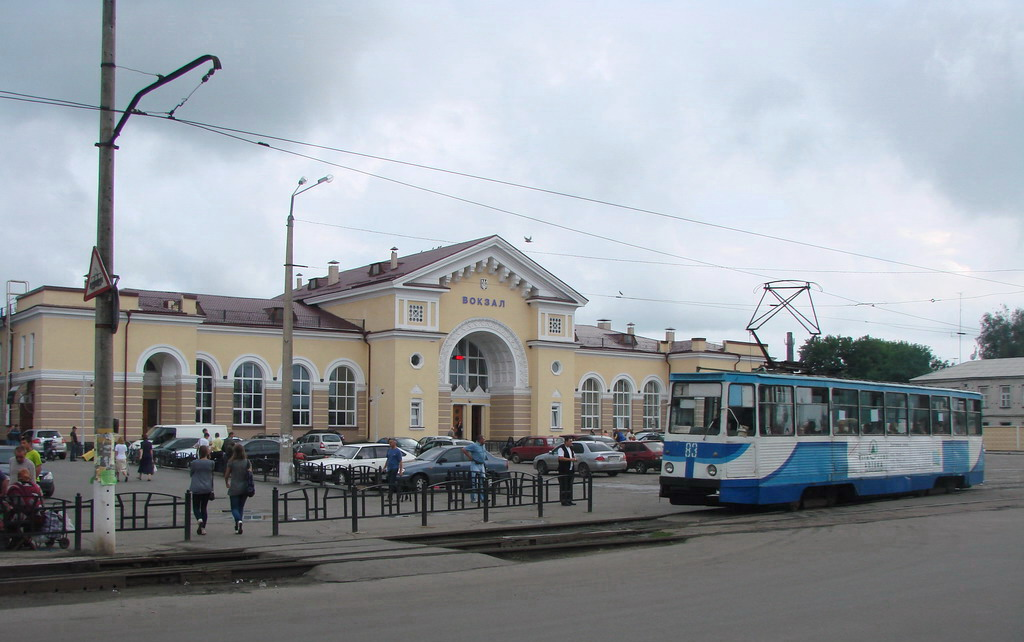
Konotop, second most populous city in the oblast and a railway center

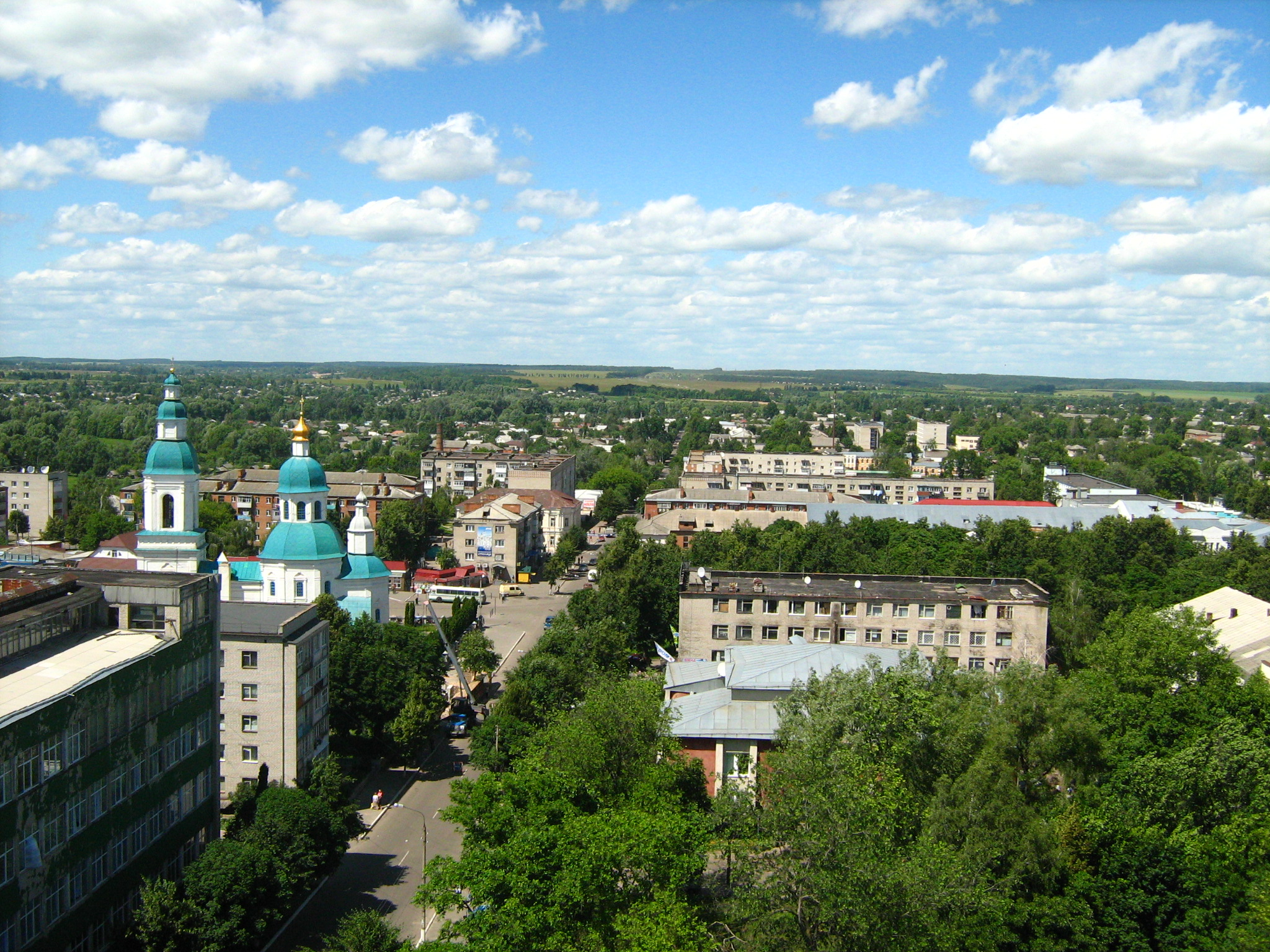
Hlukhiv, a historic city that served as the last capital of the Cossack Hetmanate

Cities in Sumy Oblast
Name	Name (in Ukrainian) (Note: Links to the Ukrainian Wikipedia articles for each city)	Raion (district)	Population (2022 estimates)	Population (2001 census)	Population change
Bilopillia	Білопілля	Sumy	15,600	18,384	−15.14%
Buryn	Буринь	Konotop	8,197	11,678	−29.81%
Hlukhiv	Глухів	Shostka	31,789	35,768	−11.12%
Khutir-Mykhailivskyi	Хутір-Михайлівський	Shostka	4,504	5,726	−21.34%
Konotop	Конотоп	Konotop	83,543	92,657	−9.84%
Krolevets	Кролевець	Konotop	22,111	25,183	−12.20%
Lebedyn	Лебедин	Sumy	23,892	28,948	−17.47%
Okhtyrka	Охтирка	Okhtyrka	46,660	50,399	−7.42%
Putyvl	Путивль	Konotop	14,886	17,354	−14.22%
Romny	Ромни	Romny	37,765	50,448	−25.14%
Seredyna-Buda	Середина-Буда	Shostka	6,888	7,511	−8.29%
Shostka	Шостка	Shostka	71,966	87,130	−17.40%
Sumy	Суми	Sumy	256,474	293,141	−12.51%
Trostianets	Тростянець	Okhtyrka	19,544	23,308	−16.15%
Vorozhba	Ворожба	Sumy	6,674	8,384	−20.40%

== See also ==
- List of cities in Ukraine
