= Vesela Dolyna =

Vesela Dolyna (Ukrainian: Весела Долина) may refer to the following places in Ukraine:

Donetsk Oblast

- Vesela Dolyna, Bakhmut Raion, Donetsk Oblast, village in Bakhmut Raion
- Vesela Dolyna, Horlivka Raion, Donetsk Oblast, village in Horlivka Raion

Sumy Oblast

- Vesela Dolyna, Lypova Dolyna rural hromada, Romny Raion, Sumy Oblast, village in Romny Raion
- Vesela Dolyna, Synivka rural hromada, Romny Raion, Sumy Oblast, village in Romny Raion

Elsewhere

- Vesela Dolyna, Dnipropetrovsk Oblast, village in Kamianske Raion
- Vesela Dolyna, Odesa Oblast, village in Bolhrad Raion
- Vesela Dolyna, Poltava Oblast, village in Kremenchuk Raion
