= Vesela Dolyna, Synivka rural hromada, Romny Raion, Sumy Oblast =

Village in Sumy Oblast, Ukraine

Vesela Dolyna Весела Долина
- Location of Vesela Dolyna Vesela Dolyna (Ukraine)
- Coordinates: 50°34′59″N 34°11′04″E
- Country: Ukraine
- Oblast: Sumy Oblast
- Raion: Romny Raion

Population (2001)
  - Total: 25
- Postal code: 42530
- Area code: +380 5452
- Climate: Cfa

Vesela Dolyna (Ukrainian: Весела Долина) is a village in Romny Raion, Sumy Oblast (province) of Ukraine.

Until 18 July 2020, Vesela Dolyna was located in the Lypova Dolyna Raion. The raion was abolished in July 2020 as part of the administrative reform of Ukraine, which reduced the number of raions of Sumy Oblast to five. The area of Lypova Dolyna Raion was merged into Romny Raion.
