= Seymskiy Regional Landscape Park =

Regional landscape park in Sumy Oblast, Ukraine

- Ukrainian: Сеймський регіональний ландшафтний парк
- IUCN category V (protected landscape/seascape)
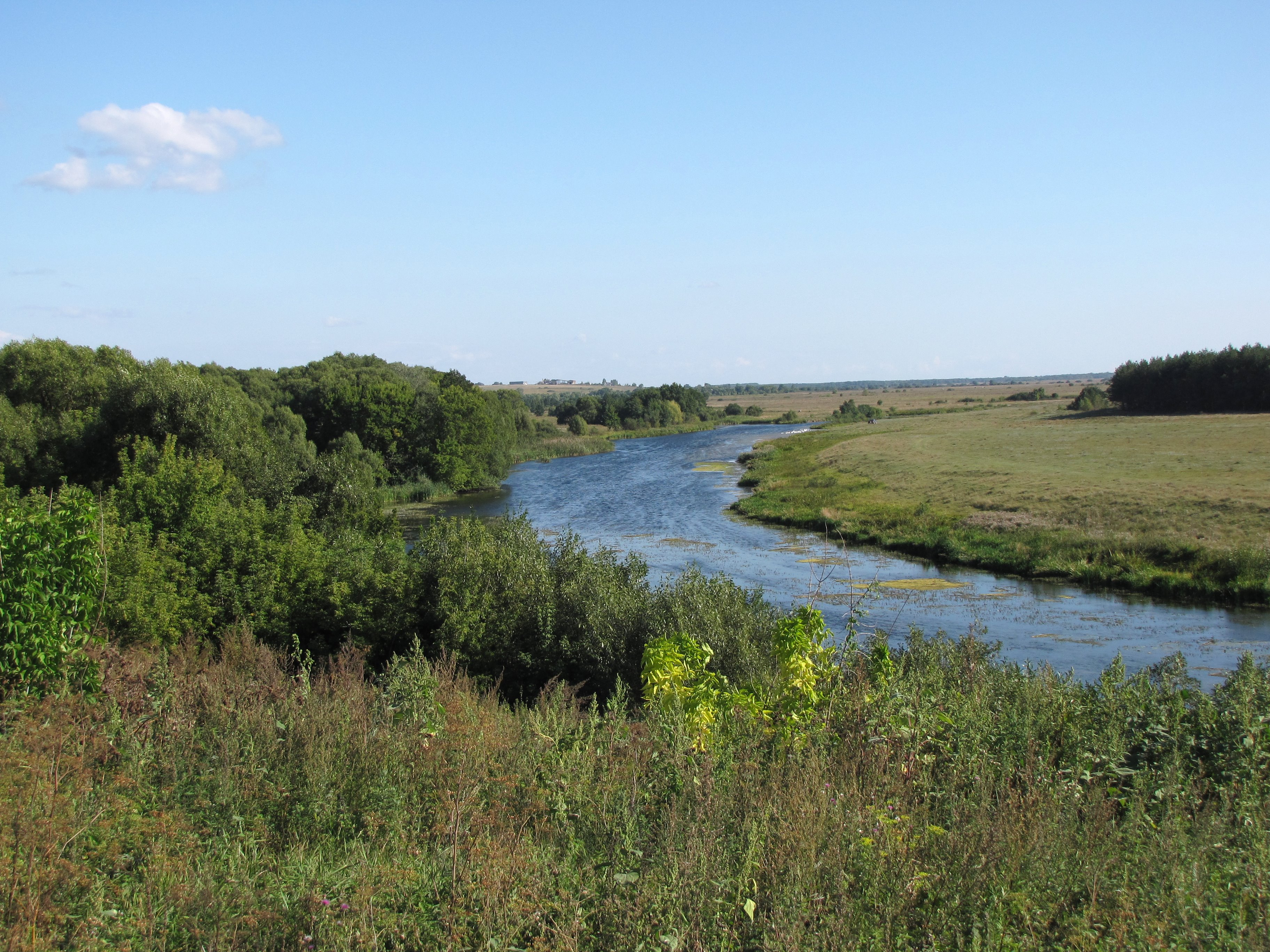
- Seymskiy Regional Landscape Park

- Location within Ukraine
- Location: Sumy Oblast
- Nearest city: Konotop, Putivl
- Coordinates: 51°21′29″N 33°22′23″E
- Area: 99,000 hectares (244,634 acres; 990 km^{2}; 382 sq mi)
- Established: 2016
- Governing body: Ministry of Ecology and Natural Resources (Ukraine) (de jure)
- Website: http://seymskiy.sumy.ua/

The Seymskiy Regional Landscape Park (Ukrainian: Сеймський регіональний ландшафтний парк) is a regional landscape park in Ukraine. It was founded in 1995, although the plans to create it date back to 1980, near the city of Konotop in the Konotop Raion of Sumy Oblast. It is located on the bank of the Seym River and its floodplain, from which the park's Ukrainian name is derived. Seymskiy Landscape Park has an area of more than 900 square kilometers in north-western Sumy Oblast. The Seym River flows through the center of the park, while the western boundary coincides with the border of Sumy Oblast. There are many swamps, bogs and lakes.

In December 2017, under the influence of hunters who were only recently disallowed from hunting there, the Konotop and Krolevets District councils planned to seize the territory from the park administration, and organized rallies demanding to close the park. To protect the park, the Kyiv Ecological and Cultural Center (KECC) filed a lawsuit against the illegal actions of the Konotop District council. On July 2, 2018, the Sumy District Administrative Court upheld the claim of the KECC and deemed the actions of Konotop District illegal. Upon the execution of the court's decision Konotop District canceled its decision on December 11, 2017. The KECC then turned to Krolevets District and offered to voluntarily cancel its decision, and it was canceled on October 19, 2018.

== Flora and Fauna ==
The forest in the park is mostly made up of pine trees. But the large wilderness area provides habitat to many animals. There are numerous mammals in Seymskiy RLP such as elks, roe deer, foxes, wild boars, muskrats, racoon dogs, beavers, and the more rare bison and weasels, as well as others. There are many bird species, including the moorhen, spotted crakes, mallards, sand martins, white wagtails, and eurasian oystercatchers. Many other rare birds breed here as well.

== See also ==
- Mizhrichynskyi Regional Landscape Park
- Mezynskyi National Nature Park
- Regional Landscape Parks in Ukraine
- National Parks in Ukraine
