= Regional landscape parks of Ukraine =

Category of protected areas in Ukraine

Regional landscape park in Ukraine is one of the categories of protected areas of Ukraine.

The Law of Ukraine defines regional landscape parks as follows:

Regional landscape parks are environment-protected recreational institutions of local or regional status that are created with the goal of conservation in natural state typical or unique natural complexes and objects as well as providing the conditions for organized recreation for the population.

Regional landscape parks are organized with withdrawal or without withdrawal of land plots, water, and other natural objects from their owners or users.

In the event when the withdrawal of land plots, water, and other natural objects is necessary for the needs of the regional landscape parks, it is conducted in order established by the legislation of Ukraine.

On regional landscape parks relies the implementation of such objectives:

- conservation of valuable natural and historical-cultural complexes and objects;
- creating conditions for effective tourism, recreation, and other types of outdoor activities in natural conditions in compliance with the regime of protection of preserved natural complexes and objects;
- promoting environmental education work.

== Notable parks ==
- Mizhrichynskyi Regional Landscape Park
- Nadsianskyi Regional Landscape Park
- Znesinnia Regional Landscape Park
- Seymskiy Regional Landscape Park
- Stilske Horbohirya Regional Landscape Park
- Feldman Ecopark

== See also ==
- Strzelce Landscape Park, Polish park on the border with Ukraine
- National Parks of Ukraine
