= Duboviazivka =

Rural locality in Sumy Oblast, Ukraine

Duboviazivka Дубов'язівка
- Rural settlement
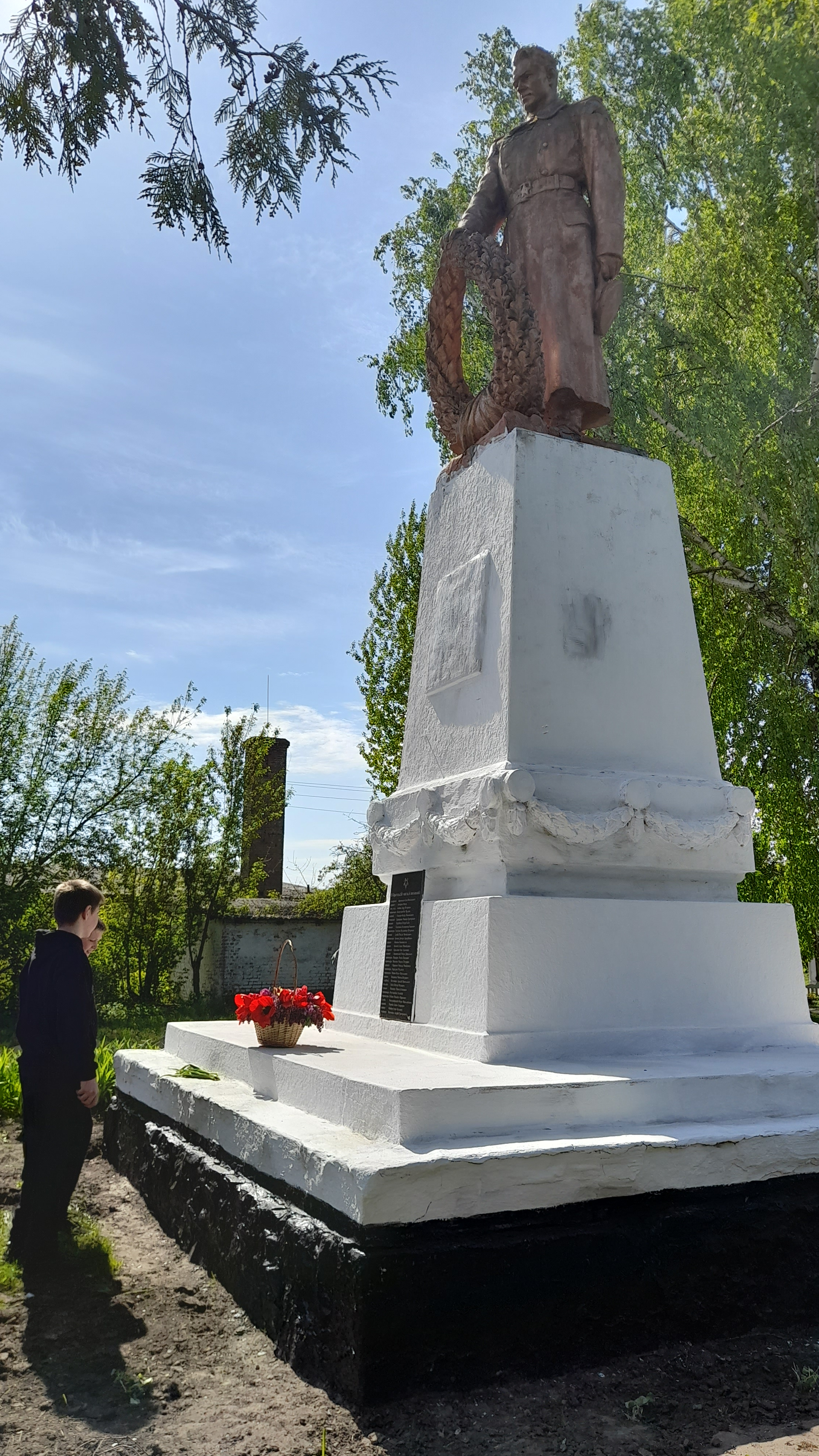
- War memorial in Duboviazivka

- Location in Sumy Oblast Location in Ukraine
- Country: Ukraine
- Oblast: Sumy Oblast
- Raion: Konotop Raion
- Hromada: Duboviazivka settlement hromada

Population (2022)
  - Total: 2,282
- Time zone: UTC+2 (EET)
  - Summer (DST): UTC+3 (EEST)

Duboviazivka (Ukrainian: Дубов'язівка; Russian: Дубовязовка) is a rural settlement in Konotop Raion, Sumy Oblast, Ukraine. It is located on the banks of the Lipka, a tributary of the Ezuch in the drainage basin of the Dnieper. Duboviazivka hosts the administration of Duboviazivka settlement hromada, one of the hromadas of Ukraine. Population: 2,282 (2022 estimate).

== History ==
Until 26 January 2024, Duboviazivka was designated urban-type settlement. On this day, a new law entered into force which abolished this status, and Duboviazivka became a rural settlement.

== Economy ==
=== Industry ===
Duboviazivka is a centre of sugar industry and production of spirits.

=== Transportation ===
The settlement is connected by road with Sumy, Romny, and Konotop.

Duboviazivka railway station, about 10 kilometres (6.2 mi) north of the settlement, is on the railway line connecting Konotop with Sumy via Vorozhba. There is infrequent passenger traffic.
