= Nedryhailiv =

Rural locality in Sumy Oblast, Ukraine

Nedryhailiv Недригайлів
- Rural settlement
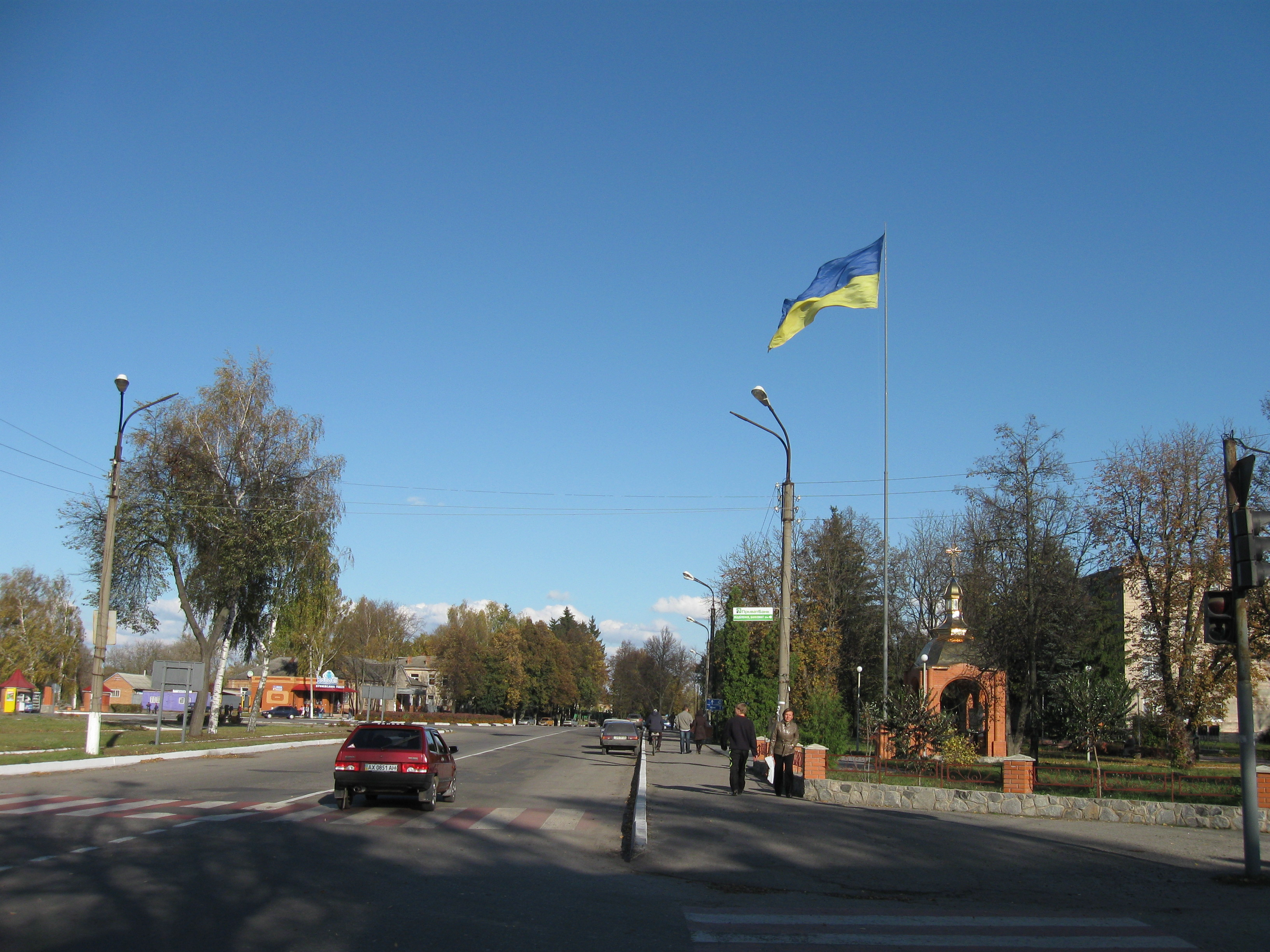
- One of the city's central intersections

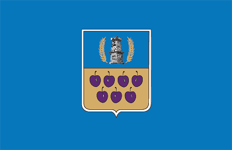
- Flag Coat of arms

- Location of Nedryhayliv in Ukraine. Nedryhailiv (Ukraine)
- Coordinates: 50°50′5″N 33°52′37″E
- Country: Ukraine
- Oblast: Sumy Oblast
- Raion: Romny Raion
- Hromada: Nedryhailiv settlement hromada
- Founded: 1639
- Elevation: 129 m (423 ft)

Population (2022)
  - Total: 5,252
- Time zone: UTC+2 (EET)
  - Summer (DST): UTC+3 (EEST)
- Postal code: 42100
- Area code: +380 5455
- Website: Nedryhailiv hromada

Nedryhailiv (Ukrainian: Недригайлів) is a rural settlement situated on the Sula River in Sumy Oblast, northeastern Ukraine. It formerly served as the administrative center of the Nedryhailiv Raion, housing the raion's administrative structure until the raion's abolition in 2020, but is now administered within Romny Raion. Population: 5,252 (2022 estimate).

== Geography ==
The town, like many localities situated in the Eurasian Steppe, is mostly flat with no nearby mountains or valleys. Large swaths of the land to the south, east, and west of the Nedryhailiv township are dedicated to agriculture while the town's northern border is formed by the Sula River.

Most of the town center is hooked up to local water mains that connect to a freshwater spring located more than 700 meters underground.

== History ==
According to the official regional history, on the territory of the former Nedryhailiv Raion settlements were formed during the late Paleolithic Era (as early as 15,000 years ago), lasting through the Bronze Age and into early Iron Age. In addition to these settlements, archaeologists discovered evidence of the Chernyakhov and Maryanivska cultures, Kurgan burial grounds of the Scythian era, and remains of a settlement of the early Slavs from the first centuries A.D.

The area in the region was populated by Severian settlers during the Kievan Rus' period. Archaeological excavations in 1972 uncovered artifacts from this period, including early Slavic pottery, a beaded necklace, and remnants of metallic weaponry. It is likely that the ancient settlement of Nedryhailiv ceased to exist after the Mongolian-Tatar Invasion of 1239. The area is believed to have remained uninhabited for almost three centuries afterward. With time, this land became part of the Grand Duchy of Lithuania, and from the year 1569, the western part of Nedryhailiv Raion broke off to the Partitions of the Polish–Lithuanian Commonwealth, where it stayed until 1647. The eastern and southeastern parts of the raion joined the Grand Duchy of Moscow.

The date is not precisely known when Nedryhailiv was established as an official township or population center. The official history estimates that the town was established no later than 1632, but another version of the town history has put it as being officially founded in 1639 by an officer of the Polish army.

Urban-type settlement since 1958.

In January 1989 the population was 6604 people.

In January 2013 the population was 5716 people.

On 26 January 2024, a new law entered into force which abolished the urban-type settlement status, and Nedryhailiv became a rural settlement.

== Transportation ==
A two-lane highway runs east-west through the center of town, connecting it to the nearby cities of Romny (33 km) and Sumy (70 km), the oblast capital. Though there are no railways that run through Nedryhailiv, two separate lines run through Romny and Sumy. Regular marshrutka and bus services connecting Nedryhailiv with villages and cities throughout the region go through the town hourly, as well as direct passage to Kyiv, the country's capital city. The Sula River does not accommodate commercial river transport.

== Education ==
There are three public educational organizations located in Nedryhailiv:

- The Nedryhailiv Nursery School — built during the Soviet era and located in the town center. Children attend this nursery beginning at age three and continue to age five or six, when they are ready to enter the first grade.
- The Nedryhailiv Specialized Secondary School — The school teaches children from the 1st-11th forms all academic subjects in accordance with the Ukrainian Ministry of Education and Science, including chemistry, Ukrainian history, physics, mathematics, foreign language (Russian, English and German), computer sciences, and literature. Approximately 800 pupils attend this school.
- The Nedryhailiv Vocational Technical School No.41 — This school teaches vocational lessons for students from the 10th–11th grades. Some of the subjects taught here are culinary arts, mechanics, computer science, and accountancy.

There are two public extracurricular schools located in the town center which focus on teaching pupils non-academic subjects.

- The Nedryhailiv Music School — This extracurricular school conducts lessons in art and musical instruments.
- The Nedryhailiv House of Students — This school provides special instruction for sports, choir, nature and dance.

== Culture ==
The town center has a multi-faceted House of Culture. This public building hosts concerts, pageants, ceremonies, and other events throughout the year.

The town library was built in 1897 and still functions in this form, standing in the center of town next to the village administration building. Though the library at one time had collections of literature printed before the Russian Revolution, the oldest books of its current collection were published no earlier than 1937 due to the loss of books during the German occupation of World War II.

Located by the Sula River is the district sports stadium. The stadium hosts football matches between local amateur football clubs from different raions throughout the Sumy Oblast. On July 7, the stadium hosts the annual Ivan Kupala Festival. Its seating capacity for more than 3,000 people and its riverside location makes the stadium an ideal venue for the traditional event, in which young women dress as rusalki (water nymphs) and light bonfires, around which they subsequently dance and invite others to dance with them. This event annually attracts several thousand visitors from all over the region and from different countries.

== Public health ==
In October 2006, a new multi-storey hospital was opened by President Viktor Yushchenko. The building was constructed as an addition to the aging hospital for long-term care. A public health clinic for non-emergency health care also exists in the town center.

== Media and Telecommunications ==
=== Media ===
Two local newspapers are based in Nedryhailiv. Holos Posullia (Голос Посулля) was founded in March 1931 by the local Soviet administration. It has since continued to report news events of the region issued in a bi-weekly format.

A private newspaper, Nedryhailiv Today! (Недригайлів Сьогодні!), was founded in 2006 and also reports regional news, though only released in a weekly format.

Several terrestrial television channels broadcast from antennae throughout the Sumy Oblast and from neighboring oblasts are received in households throughout the former Nedryhailiv Raion. These channels include:

- 1+1
- Pershyi Kanal
- Kanal 5
- Inter

=== Telecommunications ===
Since at least 2006, the national communications company Ukrtelecom has provided high-speed commercial and residential internet services in addition to its long-established telephony and telegraph services in Nedryhailiv.

Mobile telephone services of MTS, Kyivstar and Life:) and their subsidiaries all provide mobile telephone coverage throughout the former Nedryhailiv Raion.
