= Krolevets Raion =

Former subdivision of Sumy Oblast, Ukraine

Krolevets Raion Кролевецький район
- Raion
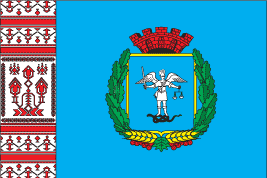
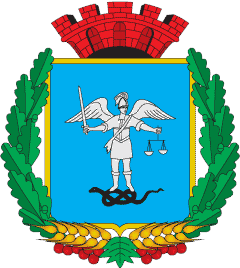
- Flag Coat of arms

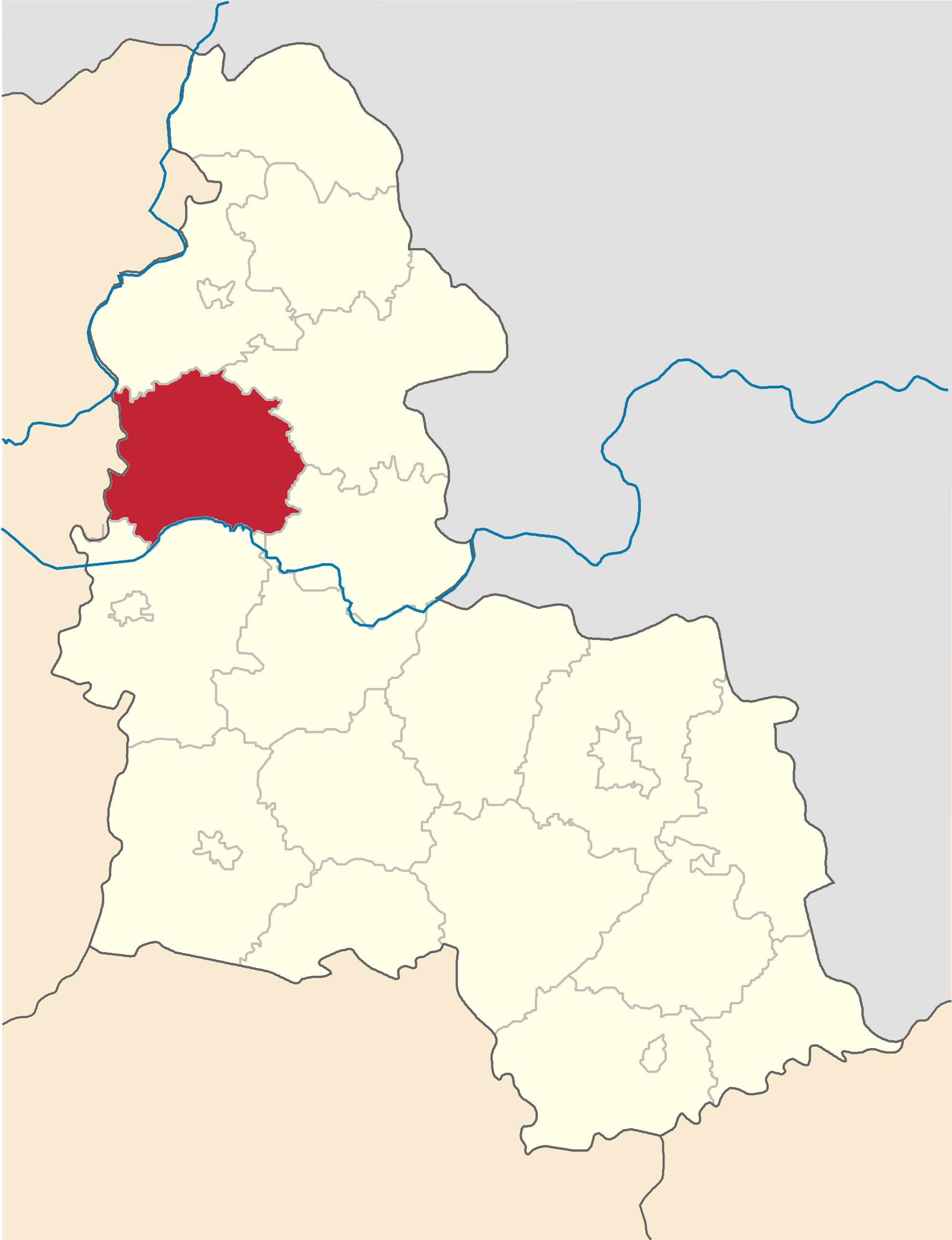
- Raion location in Sumy Oblast
- Coordinates: 51°32′8.8722″N 33°26′26.0124″E
- Country: Ukraine
- Oblast: Sumy Oblast
- Disestablished: 18 July 2020
- Admin. center: Krolevets

Area
  - Total: 1,284 km^{2} (496 sq mi)

Population (2020)
  - Total: 36,390
  - Density: 28.34/km^{2} (73.40/sq mi)
- Time zone: UTC+2 (EET)
  - Summer (DST): UTC+3 (EEST)
- Website: http://www.krolrda.gov.ua/

Krolevets Raion (Ukrainian: Кролевецький район) was a raion in Sumy Oblast in North Ukraine. The administrative center of the raion was the town of Krolevets. The raion was abolished on 18 July 2020 as part of the administrative reform of Ukraine, which reduced the number of raions of Sumy Oblast to five. The last estimate of the raion population was 36,390 (2020 est.).

== Geography ==
The area of the Raion is 1284 km^{2}. Krolevetskyi Raion is located in the northwestern part of Sumy Oblast. The raion borders on Shostky in the north, Glukhiv in the east, Putyvl in the southeast, Konotop in the south, and Koropskyi district of Chernihiv Oblast in the west. The Krolevetskyi Raion located on the slopes of the Central Russian Plain.

The relief of the district is mostly lowland, covered with coniferous and broad-leaved forests and meadow steppes. Meadows grow in the floodplains of rivers. The Desna and Seym rivers flow through the raion. The river in the floodplain has many oxbow lakes. The forests of Krolevetskyi raion are rich in mushrooms and berries. Among the mushrooms, chanterelles, tricholoma equestre, suillus luteus, armillaria mellea, russula and porcini mushrooms predominate. The most common berries are blueberries, raspberries, and blackberries

The climate is moderately continental. Winter is cool, summer is not hot. The average temperature in July is +19 °C, in January -7.5 °C. The maximum precipitation falls in the summer in the form of rain. The average annual amount is from 550 to 650 mm, changing from west to east.

Seymskiy Regional Landscape Park is located in Krolevetskyi raion in the Seym Valley. There are numerous mammals in Seymskiy RLP such as elks, roe deer, foxes, wild boars, muskrats, racoon dogs, beavers, and the more rare bison and weasels, as well as others. There are many bird species, including the moorhen, spotted crakes, mallards, sand martins, white wagtails, and eurasian oystercatchers. Many other rare birds breed here as well.

Of the minerals, Krolevetskyi raion is rich in peat, clay, and construction sand.

== Transport ==
The railway and highway M02 to Kyiv pass through the raion. The railway station is located in Krolevets.
