= Lypova Dolyna =

Rural locality in Sumy Oblast, Ukraine

Lypova Dolyna Липова Долина
- Rural settlement
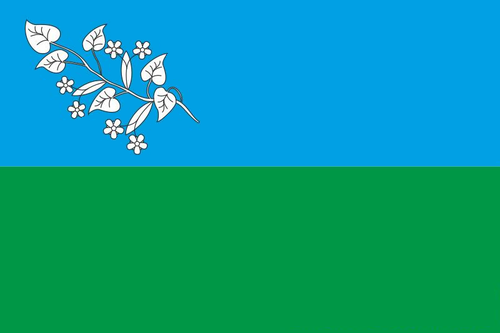
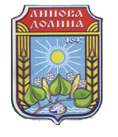
- Flag Coat of arms

- Location within Sumy Oblast Location within Ukraine
- Coordinates: 50°33′42″N 33°47′07″E
- Country: Ukraine
- Oblast: Sumy Oblast
- Raion: Romny Raion
- Hromada: Lypova Dolyna settlement hromada
- First mentioned: first half of 17th century

Population (2022)
  - Total: 4,991
- Time zone: UTC+02:00 (EET)
  - Summer (DST): UTC+03:00 (EEST)
- Postal index: 42500
- Area code: +380 5452
- Website: http://www.lipovadolina.info/

Lypova Dolyna (Ukrainian: Липова Долина) is a rural settlement in Romny Raion, Sumy Oblast, northeastern Ukraine. Population: 4,479 (2024 estimate); 4,991 (2022 estimate).

== History ==
The date of establishment of Lypova Dolyna is not known, but it was first mentioned sometime in 17th century as a village of Magnate Jeremi Wiśniowiecki in Kiev Voivodeship. Its name Lypova Dolyna (Linden Valley) has derived from local river Lypivka.

In 1647 the village contained 150 dwelling yards (households). The population of the village actively participated in the Khmelnytsky Uprising after which it became part of Myrhorod Regiment (one of administrative divisions of Cossack Hetmanate).

In 1658 Lypova Dolyna was raided by Tatars. Later it was a private estate of various Cossack officers (starshina). In 1764 the Russian Empress Catherine the Great gave away Lypova Dolyna to Kirill Razumovski who surrendered his Hetmanate authority the same year. In 1785 the village was sold to the Russian Treasury.

During World War II it was under German occupation.

Gained the status of an urban-type settlement in 1961.

In January 1989 the population was 5303 people.

In January 2013 the population was 5324 people.

On 26 January 2024, a new law entered into force which abolished the status of urban-type settlement, and Lypova Dolyna became a rural settlement.
