= Buryn Raion =

Former subdivision of Sumy Oblast, Ukraine

Buryn Raion Буринський район
- Raion
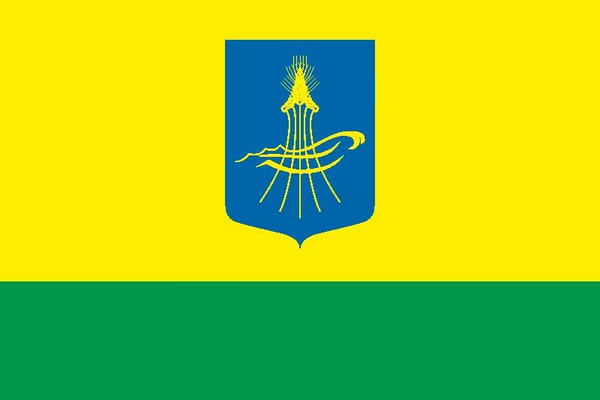
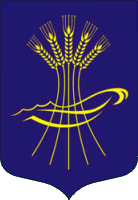
- Flag Coat of arms

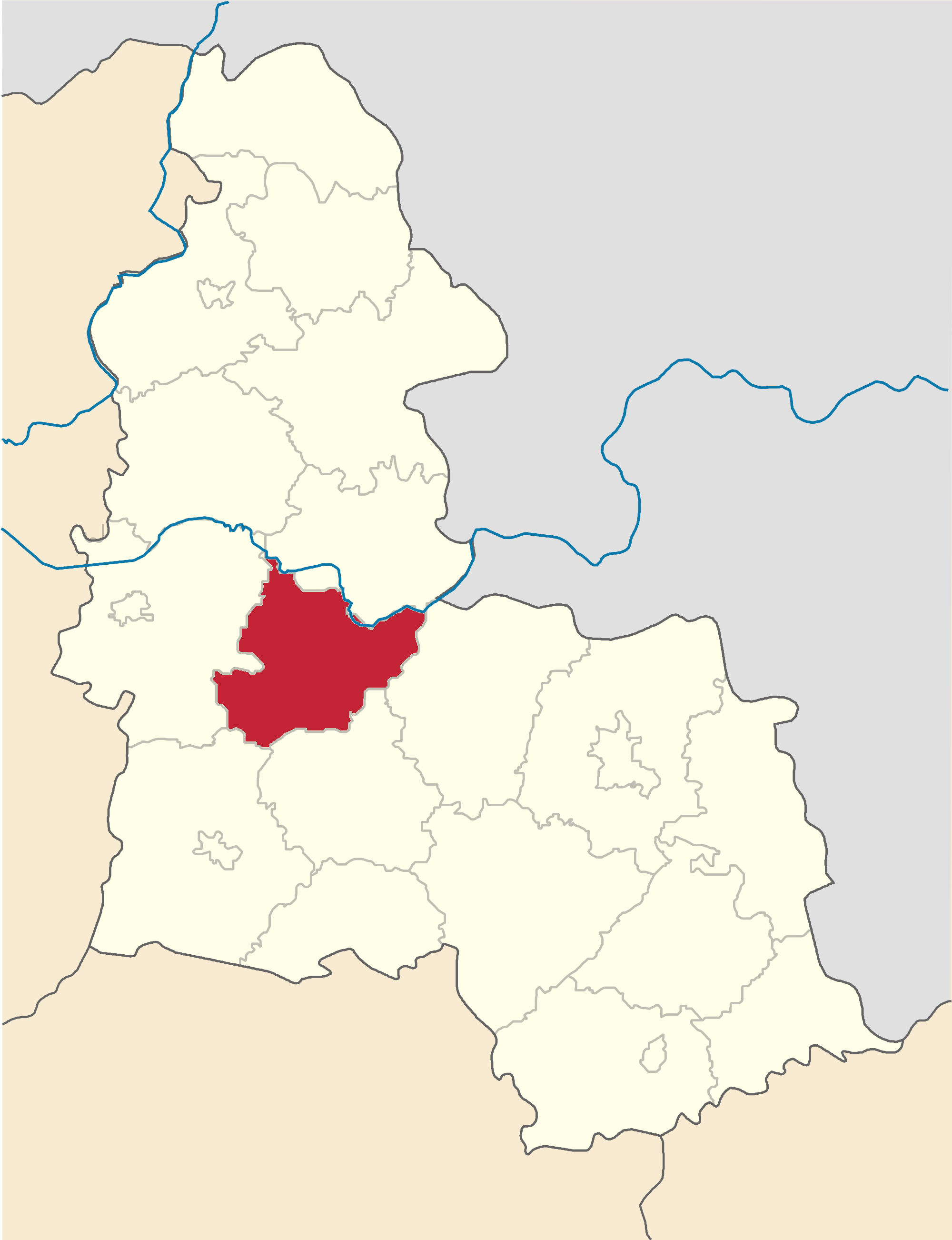
- Raion location in Sumy Oblast
- Coordinates: 51°7′35.0724″N 33°47′5.9028″E
- Country: Ukraine
- Oblast: Sumy Oblast
- Disestablished: 18 July 2020
- Admin. center: Buryn

Area
  - Total: 1,100 km^{2} (420 sq mi)

Population (2020)
  - Total: 22,962
  - Density: 21/km^{2} (54/sq mi)
- Time zone: UTC+2 (EET)
  - Summer (DST): UTC+3 (EEST)
- Website: brn.sm.gov.ua/index.php/uk/

Buryn Raion (Ukrainian: Буринський район) was a raion in Sumy Oblast in Central Ukraine. The administrative center of the raion was the town of Buryn. The raion was abolished on 18 July 2020 as part of the administrative reform of Ukraine, which reduced the number of raions of Sumy Oblast to five. The last estimate of the raion population was 22,962 (2020 est.).
