= Svesa =

Rural locality in Sumy Oblast, Ukraine

Svesa Свеса
- Rural settlement
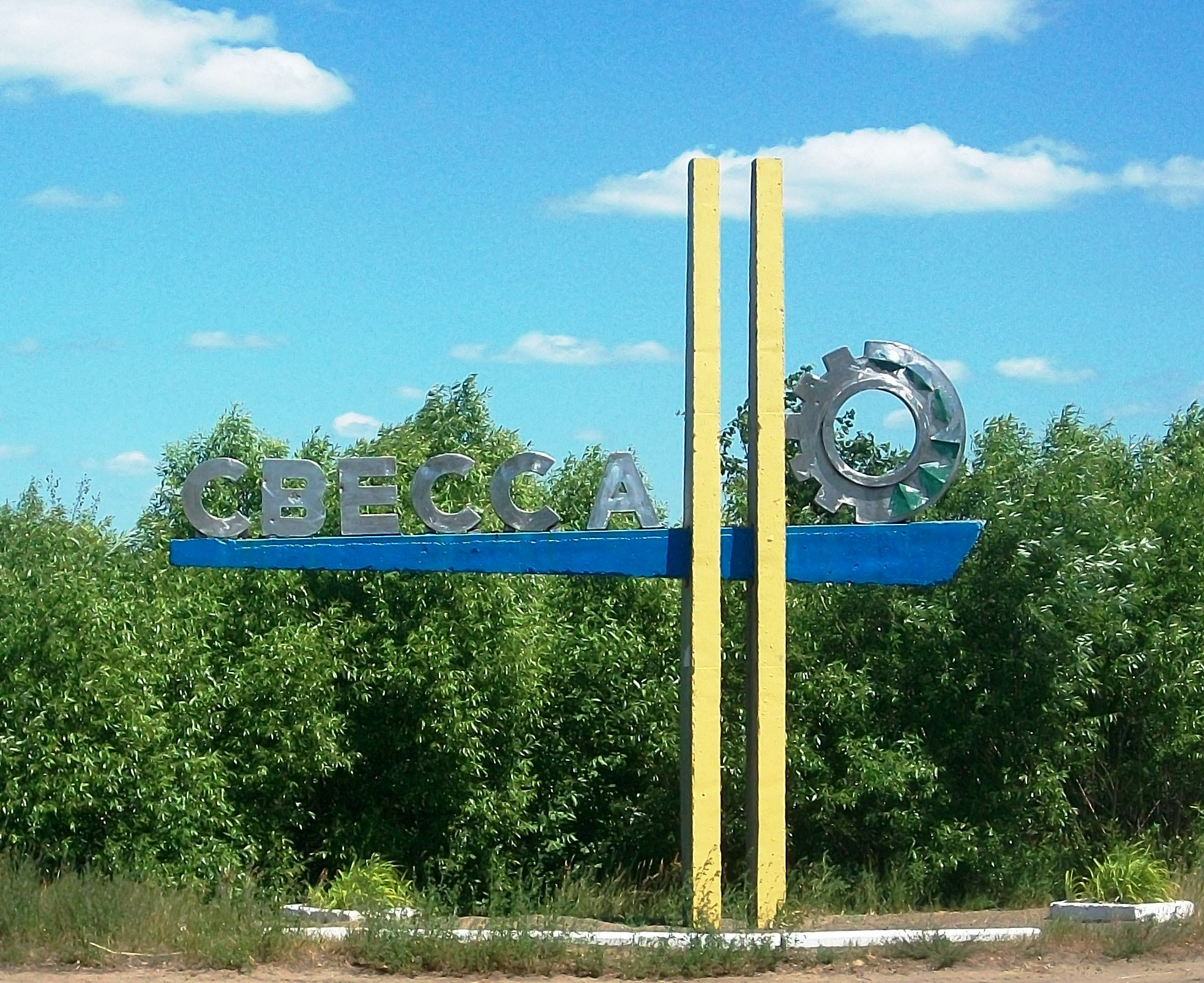

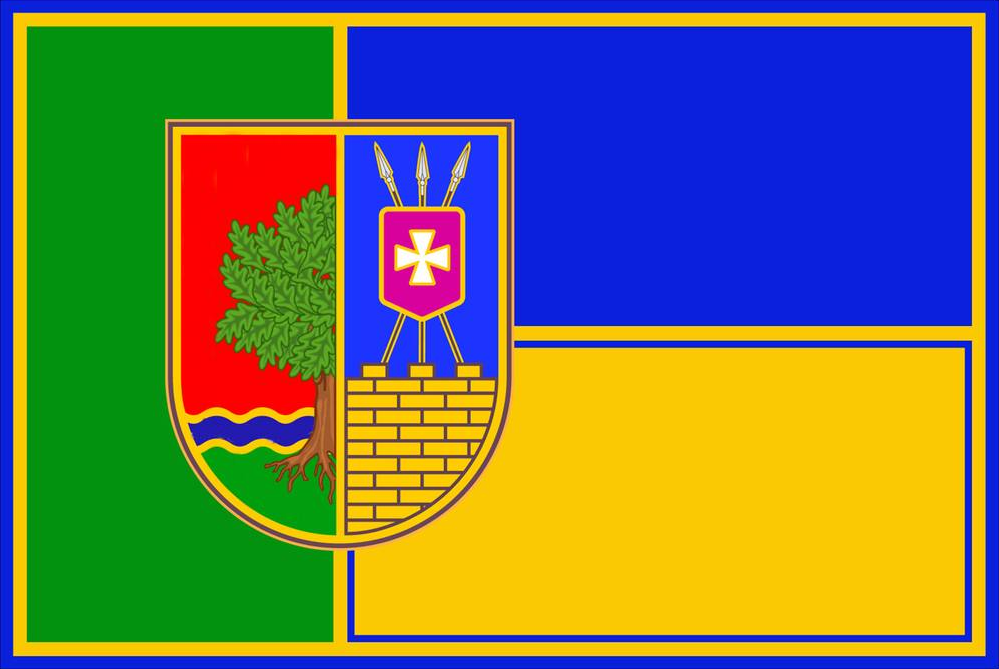
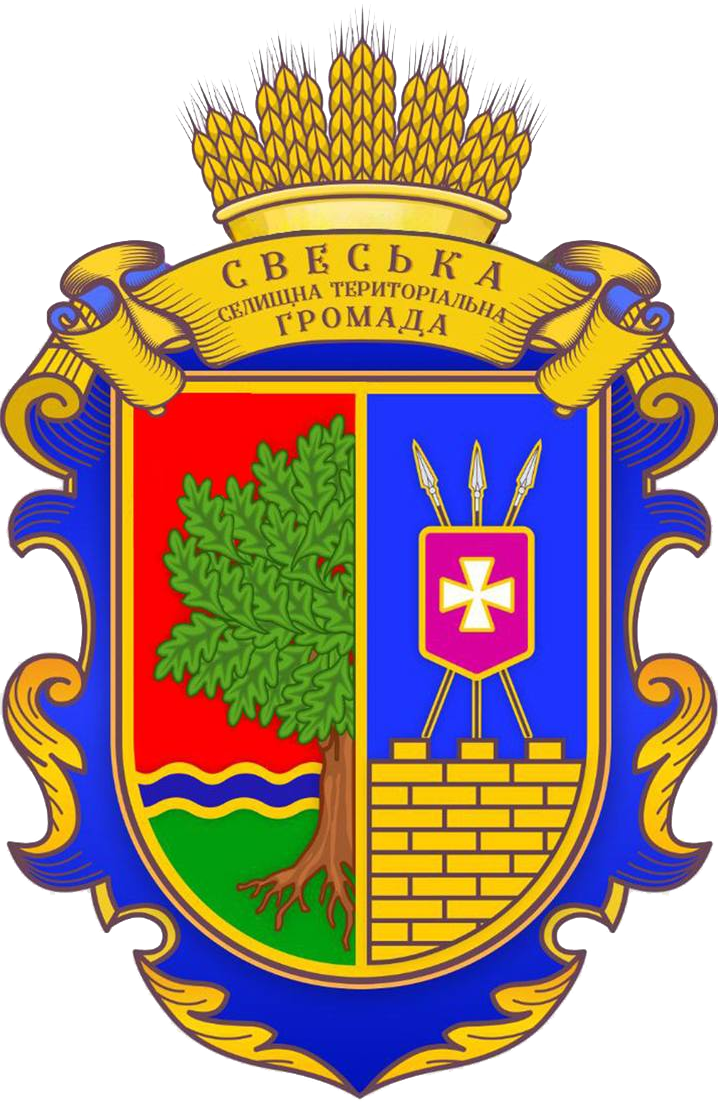
- Flag Coat of arms

- Location of Svesa in Sumy Oblast Location of Svesa in Ukraine
- Coordinates: 51°56′51″N 33°56′00″E
- Country: Ukraine
- Oblast: Sumy Oblast
- Raion: Shostka Raion
- Hromada: Svesa settlement hromada
- Founded: 1670

Area
  - Total: 6.7 km^{2} (2.6 sq mi)

Population (2022)
  - Total: 6,186
  - Density: 920/km^{2} (2,400/sq mi)
- Time zone: UTC+2 (EET)
  - Summer (DST): UTC+3 (EEST)
- Postal code: 41226
- Area code: +3805456

Svesa (Ukrainian: Свеса) is a rural settlement in Shostka Raion, Sumy Oblast, Ukraine. Population: 6,186 (2022 estimate).

== History ==
It was a village in Hlukhivsky Povit in Chernihiv Governorate of the Russian Empire.

Urban-type settlement since 1938.

During World War II, it was occupied by the Axis troops from October 1941 to August 1943.

In 1954, there were two factories, a forestry farm, two secondary schools, a vocational school and a club. Since 1963, a technical school has been here.

In January 1989 the population was 8890 people.

In January 2013 the population was 6907 people.

On 26 January 2024, a new law entered into force which abolished the urban-type settlement status, and Svesa became a rural settlement.
