= Nedryhailiv Raion =

Former subdivision of Sumy Oblast, Ukraine

Nedryhailiv Raion Недригайлівський район
- Raion
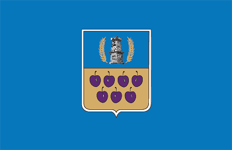
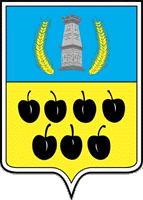
- Flag Coat of arms

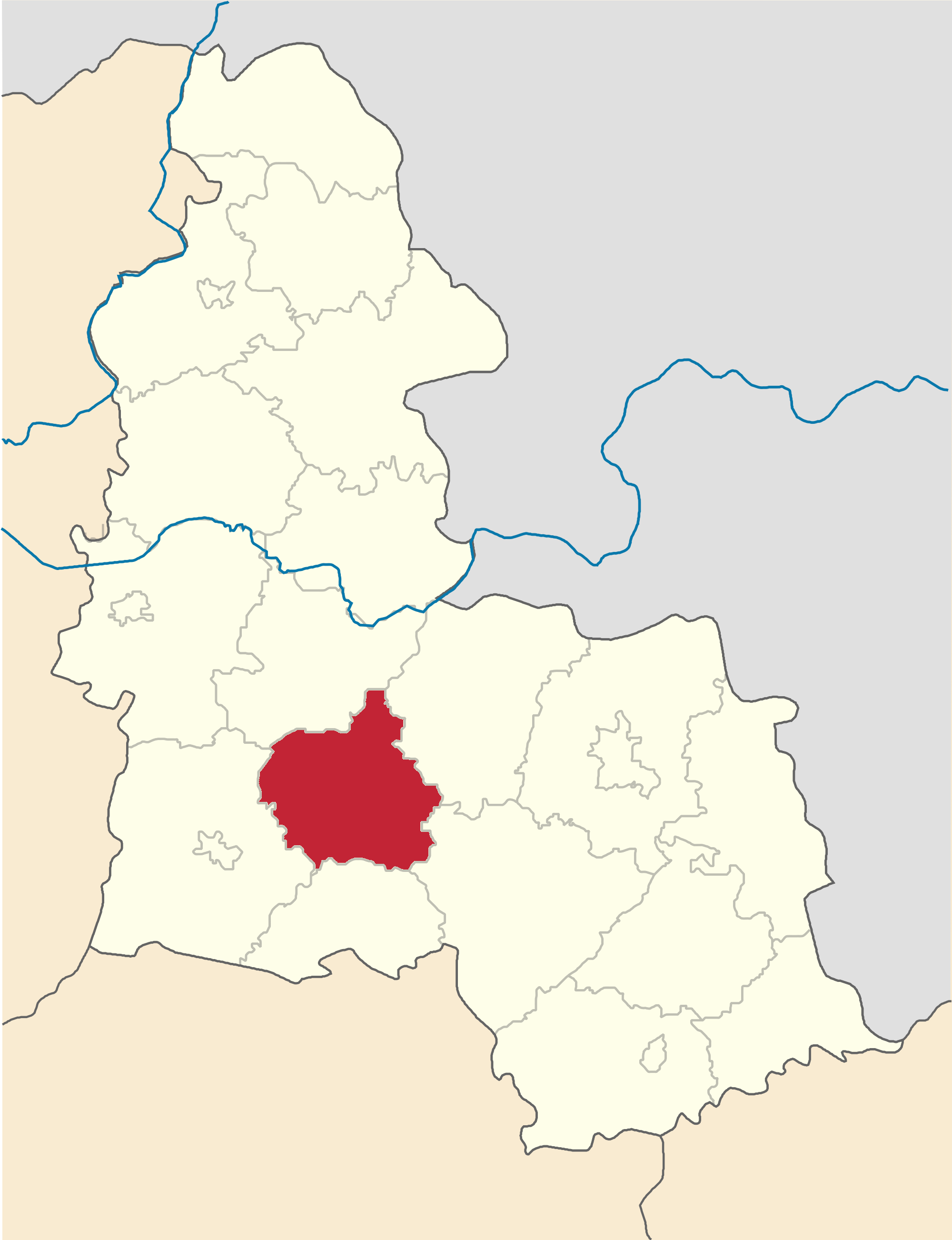
- Raion location in Sumy Oblast
- Coordinates: 50°51′37.0758″N 33°54′34.9668″E
- Country: Ukraine
- Oblast: Sumy Oblast
- Disestablished: 18 July 2020
- Admin. center: Nedryhailiv

Area
  - Total: 1,025 km^{2} (396 sq mi)

Population (2020)
  - Total: 22,972
  - Density: 22.41/km^{2} (58.05/sq mi)
- Time zone: UTC+2 (EET)
  - Summer (DST): UTC+3 (EEST)
- Website: http://ndr.sm.gov.ua/

Nedryhailiv Raion (Ukrainian: Недригайлівський район) was a raion in Sumy Oblast in Central Ukraine. The administrative center of the raion was the urban-type settlement of Nedryhailiv. The raion was abolished on 18 July 2020 as part of the administrative reform of Ukraine, which reduced the number of raions of Sumy Oblast to five. The last estimate of the raion population was 22,972 (2020 est.).
