= Buryn =

City in Sumy Oblast, Ukraine

Buryn Буринь
- City
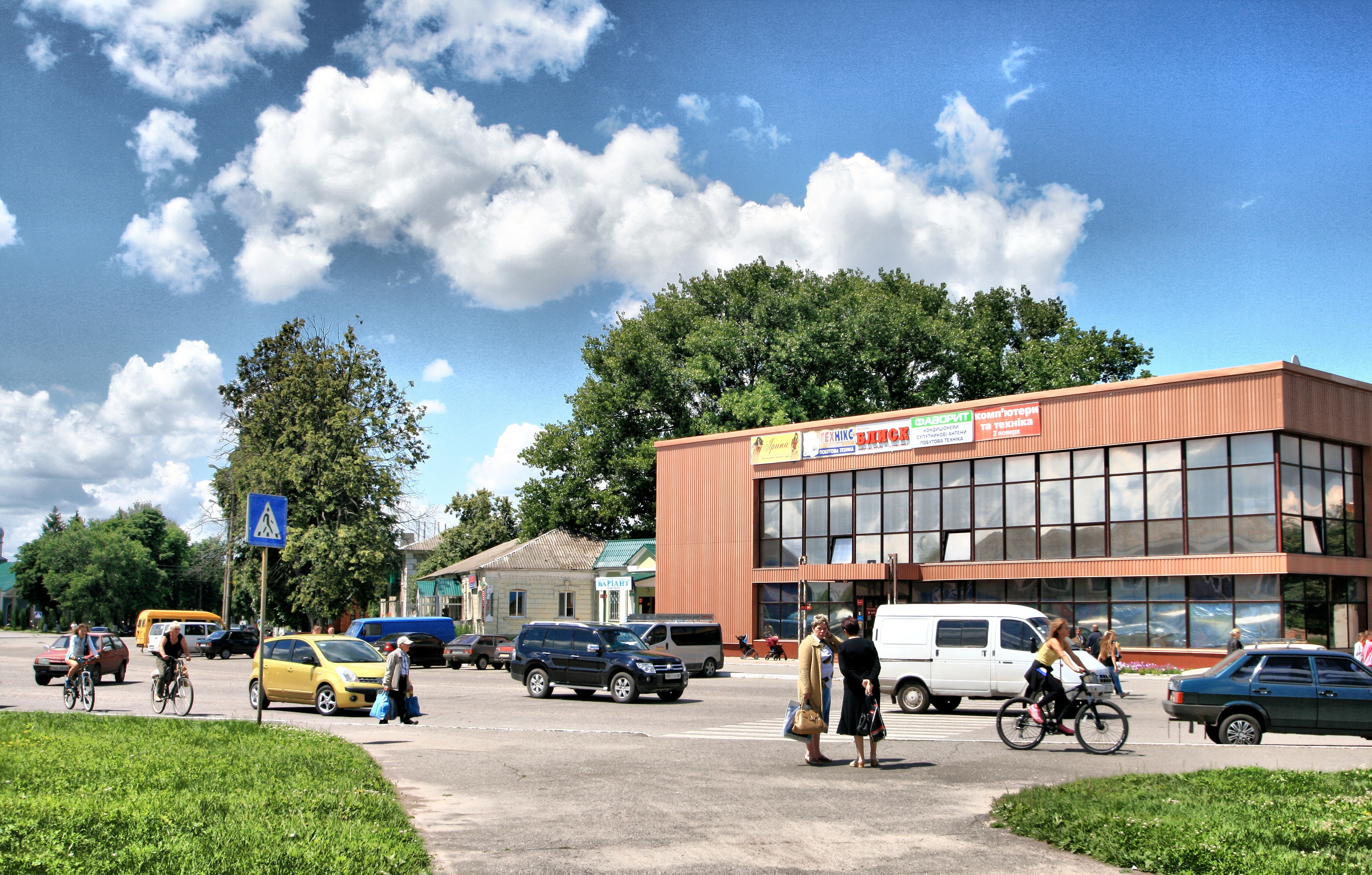
- Buryn city centre

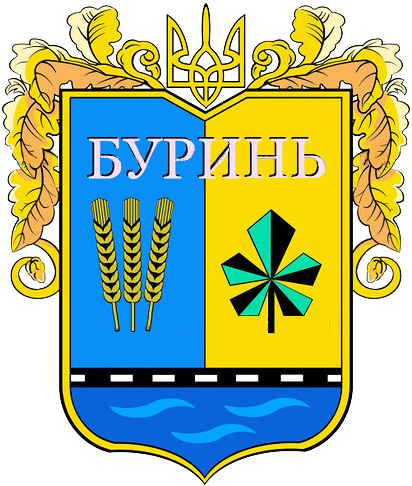
- Coat of arms

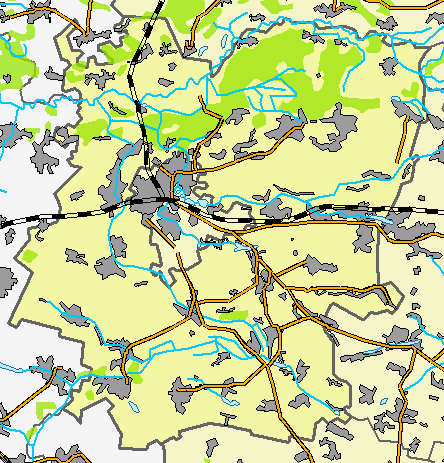
- City of Buryn and surroundings

- Location of Buryn Buryn (Ukraine)
- Coordinates: 51°11′45″N 33°49′36″E
- Country: Ukraine
- Oblast: Sumy Oblast
- Raion: Konotop Raion
- Hromada: Buryn urban hromada
- Established: 14th Century

Population (2022)
  - Total: 8,197
- Postal code: 41700-708
- Area code: +38 (05454)

Buryn (Ukrainian: Буринь, pronounced [bʊˈrɪnʲ]) is a city in Konotop Raion of Sumy Oblast, in north-eastern Ukraine. It was the administrative center of Buryn Raion until it was abolished on 18 July 2020. The population estimate is 8,197 (2022 estimate). Between 24 February and 4 April 2022, the city was under Russian occupation.

== Geography ==
Buryn is a relatively small, cozy town/small city situated on the banks of the Chasha River. A dam across the Chasha has created a substantial lake, which is now surrounded by specially planted yew trees.

Buryn is home to Putyvl railway station of Southwestern Railways. Roads T1908, T1910, and T1916 pass through the city.

== Etymology ==
The origin of the name of the city of Buryn is unknown, although there are some assumptions. Some associate the ancient Russian city of Byrin, which is mentioned in the "List of Rus Cities Distant and Near" of the XIV century, with Buryn, but this theory is not confirmed by archaeological finds. There is also a version that Buryn was inhabited in the XVII century by migrants from the village of Borynia (now in Lviv Oblast), because even now in Borynia and Buryn live representatives of ancient families: Haiduky (Gaidukov), Siplyvy, Boyko, etc.

== History ==
The first written mention of the village of Borin (in some other handwritten sources also known as Barin) is dated to 1688, as evidenced by the "Heographic Encyclopedic Word" edited by A. F. Trosnikov (Moscow, publishing house "Svetskaya incyclopedia", 1989, p. 88). It was settled by free Cherkasians (so then Muscovites called Ukrainians) on the lands of the lands of The Chaskyi and Osletskyi towns, which were called "wild fields" and belonged to the popes of Church of Nicholas the Wonderworker Velykoretsky in Putyvl.

According to the 6th revision, 1,080 males lived in the church settlement.

Subsequently, Buryn became the sloboda and the center of the Putyvl Volost district of Kursk Province. For 80 years in the XVII century, the village was in the possession of the church, and since 1769 belonged to different landowners.

As of 1862, there were 2,893 people (1,412 men and 1,481 women) living in 360 farms, and there was an Orthodox Church and a school.

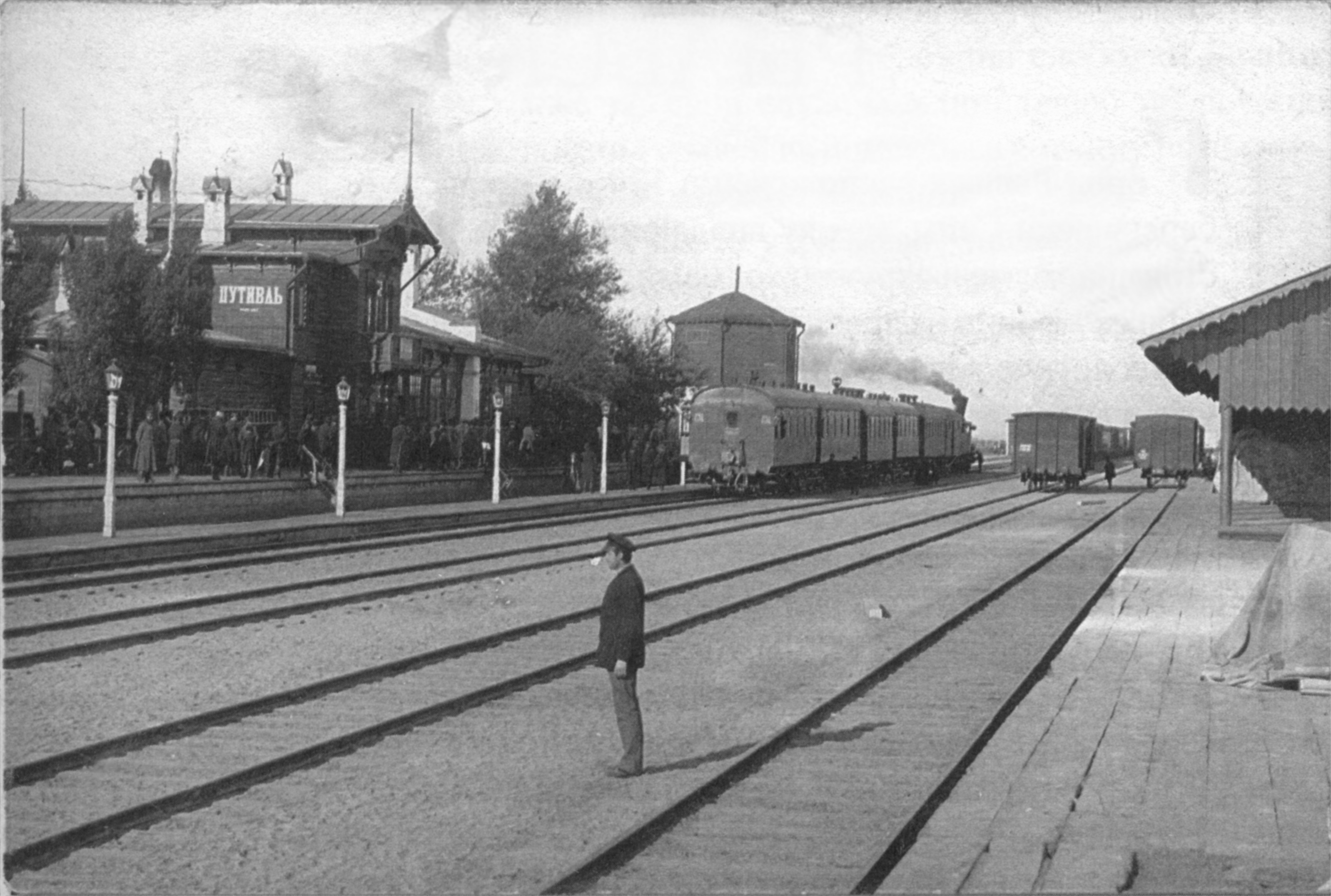
Putyvl railway station in Buryn in 1912

In 1869 Putyvl railway station was built, then called Krasne.

At least 90 residents died during the Soviet-organized Holodomor of 1932-1933.

During the German occupation in World War II, in 1943, the Germans operated a subcamp of the Dulag 102 prisoner-of-war camp in the town.

Buryn came under Russian occupation on 24 February, the first day of the 2022 Russian invasion of Ukraine. The first Russian columns arrived in the city around 11:00. Columns of Russian military vehicles passed through the city daily until late March. During the Russian pullout in early April, the city was liberated and is now back under Ukrainian control.

On September 18, 2022, an F3 tornado struck the town, killing one and injuring eight people.

== Demographics ==
As of the Ukrainian national census in 2001, Buryn had a population of 11,607 people. That number dropped to 8,197 in early 2022.

=== Ethnic groups ===
Distribution of the population by ethnicity according to the 2001 census:

Ethnic groups in Buryn
	percent
Ukrainians	94.68%
Russians	4.17%
Belarusians	0.40%
Gypsies	0.28%
Armenians	0.09%

=== Languages ===
Distribution of the population by their native language according to the 2001 census:

Native languages in Buryn
	percent
Ukrainian	95.3%
Russian	4.0%
Belarusian	0.2%
Romani	0.1%
Armenian	0.1%
others	0.1%

== Economy ==
Buryn has been known as a centre of sugar industry. Among the leading enterprises of the city is PJSC "Buryn Dry Milk Plant", whose products are known not only in Ukraine, but also in Russia, Georgia, and Armenia. 124 thousand tons of products can be placed on the Buryn scale. This is one of the largest enterprises of the district, which works steadily.

== Gallery ==
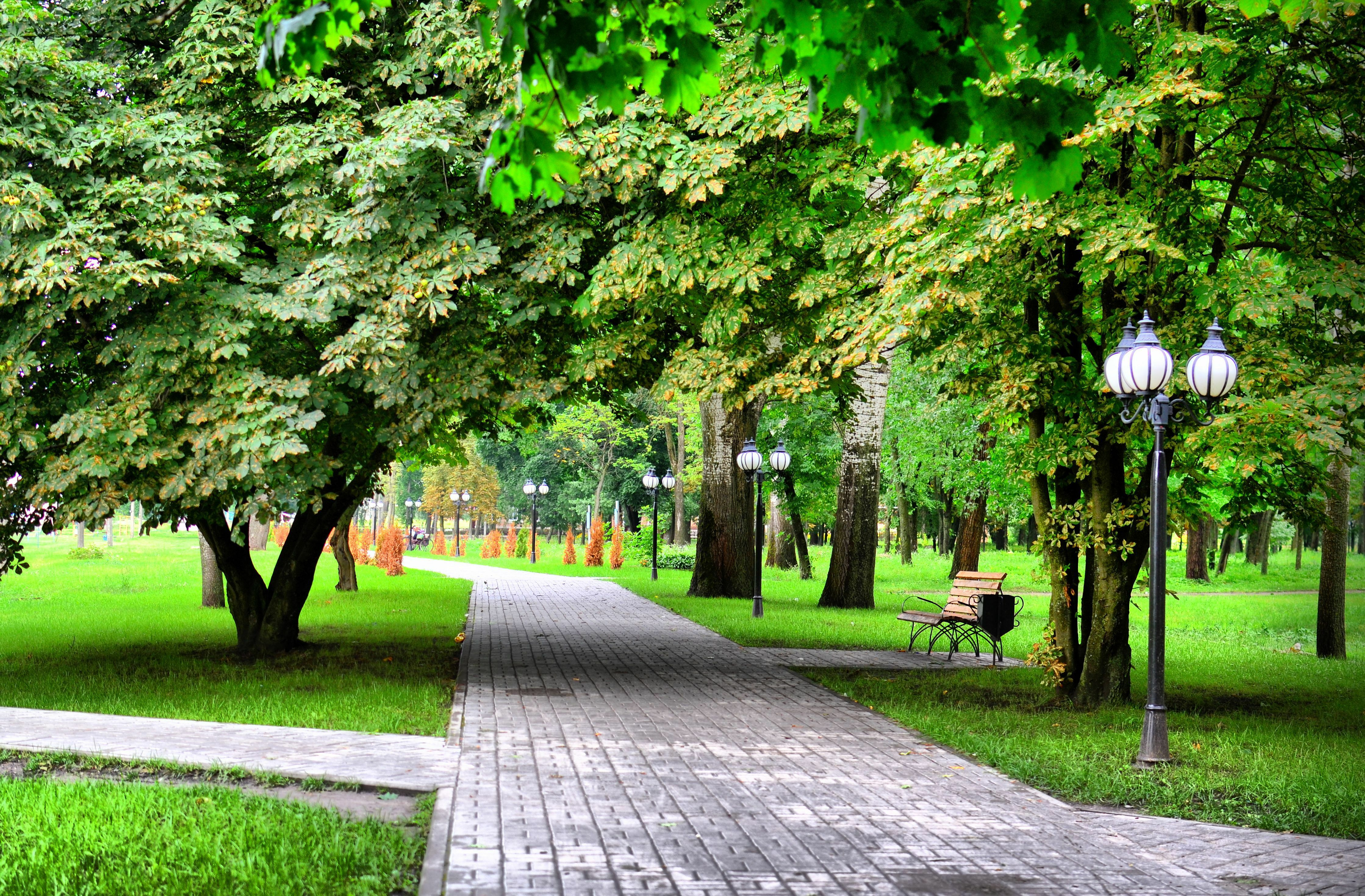
City park

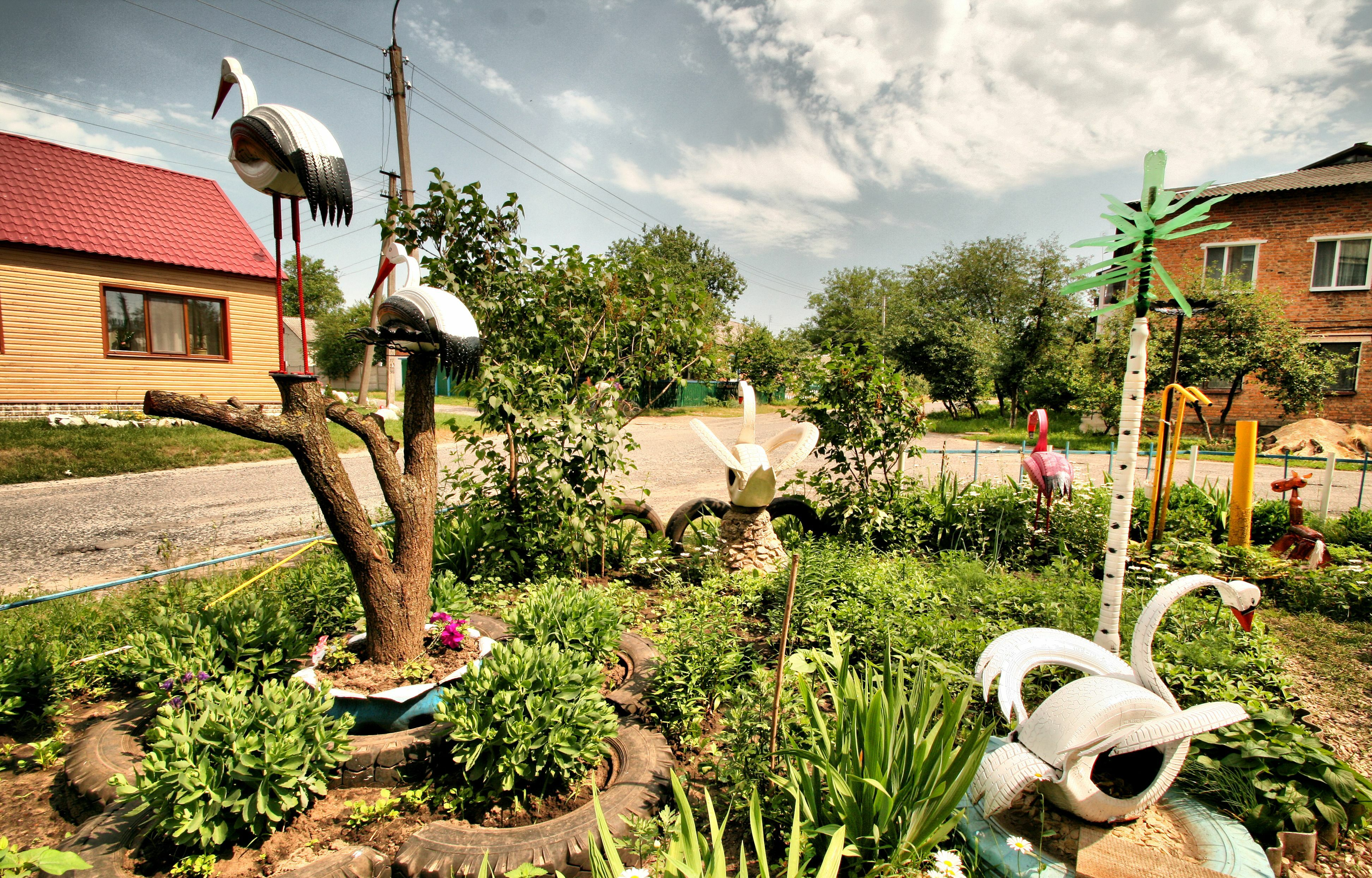
Streets in Buryn

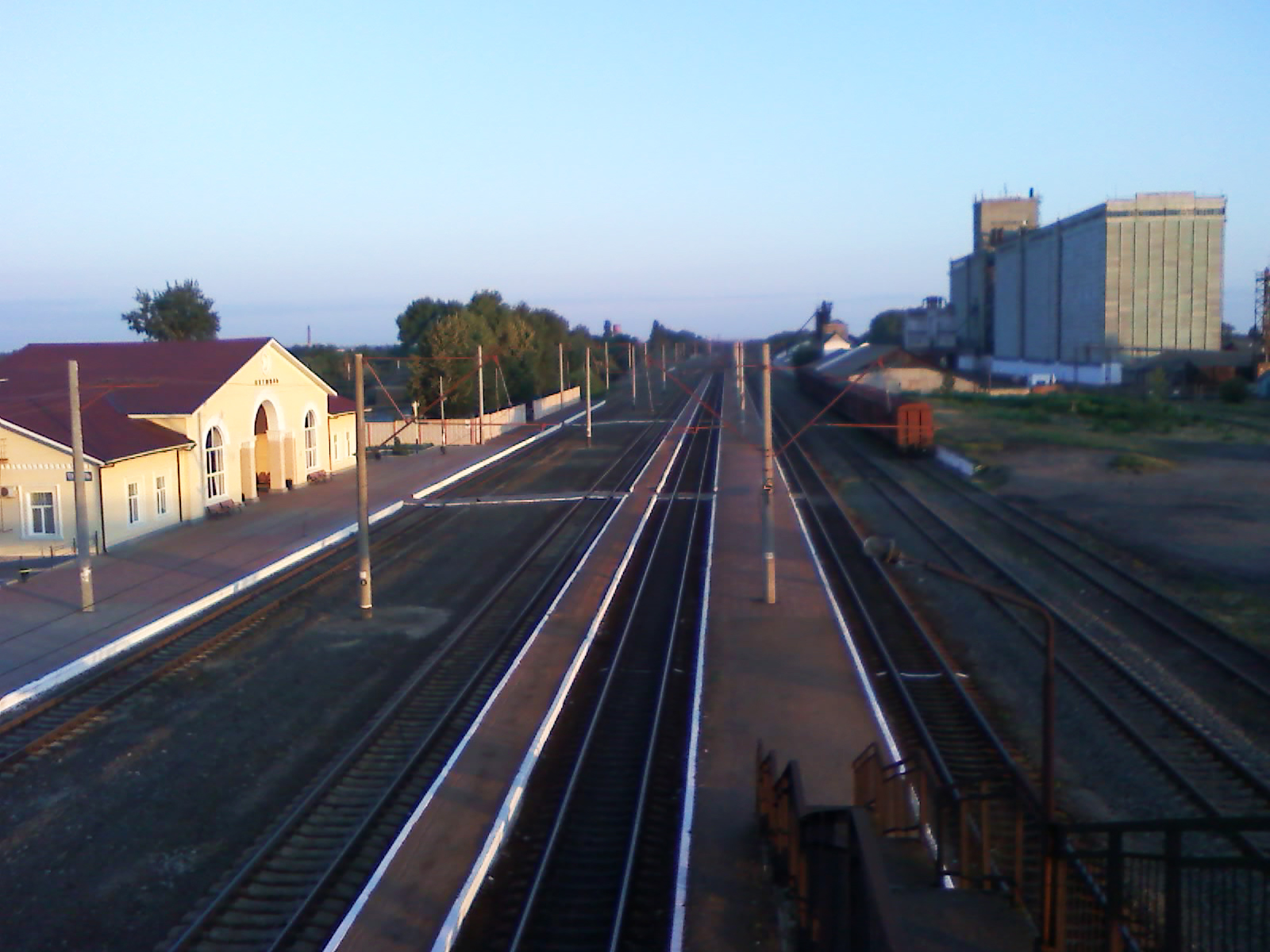
Railway station

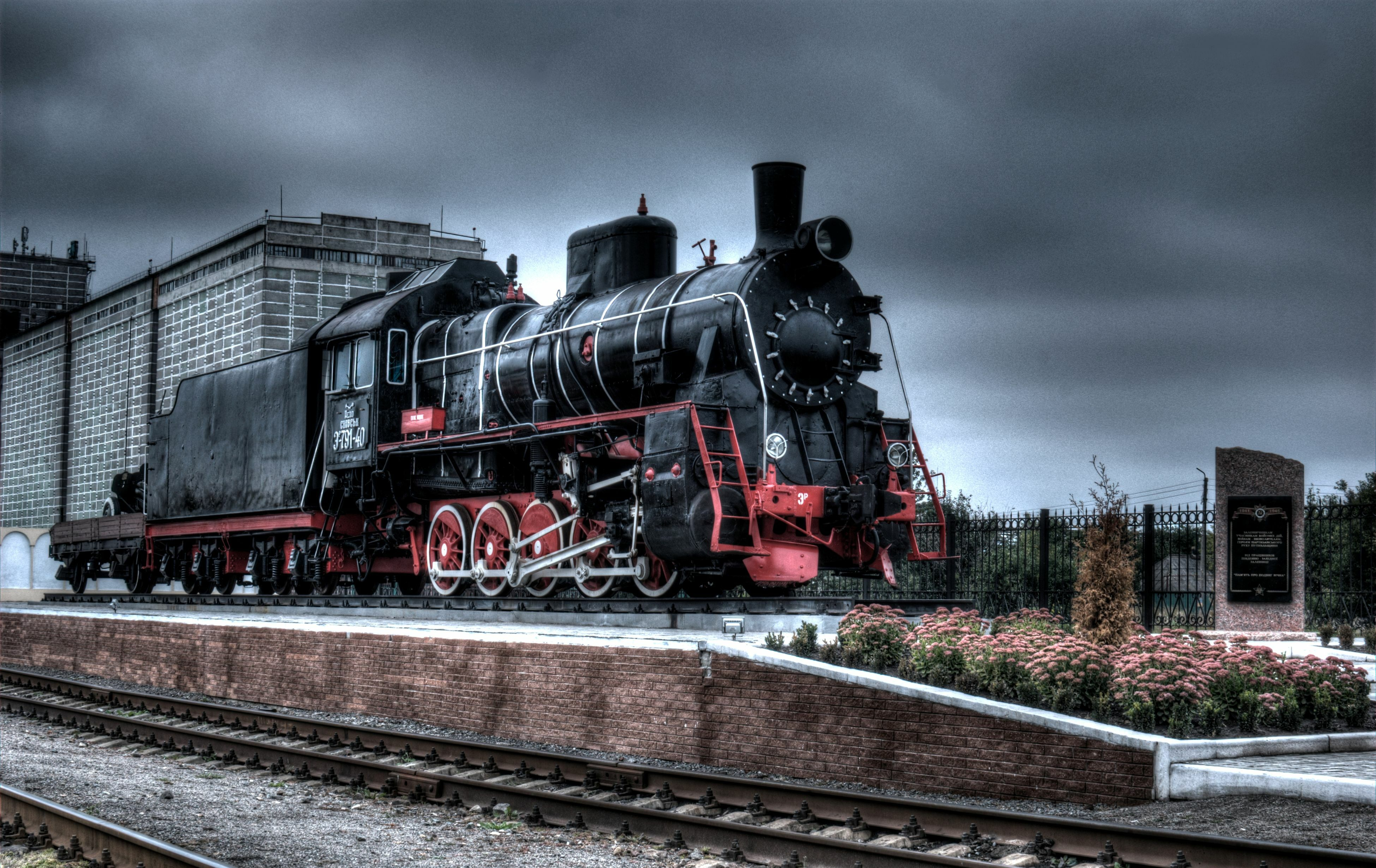
Locomotive monument at Putyvl railway station
