= Vesela Dolyna, Dnipropetrovsk Oblast =

Village in Dnipropetrovsk Oblast, Ukraine

Vesela Dolyna Весела Долина
- Location of Vesela Dolyna Vesela Dolyna (Ukraine)
- Coordinates: 48°10′45″N 34°02′55″E
- Country: Ukraine
- Oblast: Dnipropetrovsk Oblast
- Raion: Kamianske Raion

Population (2001)
  - Total: 45
- Postal code: 52351
- Area code: +380 5654
- Climate: Cfa

Vesela Dolyna (Ukrainian: Весела Долина) is a village in Kamianske Raion, Dnipropetrovsk Oblast (province) of Ukraine.

Until 18 July 2020, Vesela Dolyna was located in the Krynychky Raion. The raion was abolished in July 2020 as part of the administrative reform of Ukraine, which reduced the number of raions of Dnipropetrovsk Oblast to seven. The area of Krynychky Raion was merged into Kamianske Raion.
