= Mizhrichynskyi Regional Landscape Park =

Regional landscape park in Chernihiv Oblast, Ukraine

- Ukrainian: Міжрічинський регіональний ландшафтний парк
- IUCN category V (protected landscape/seascape)
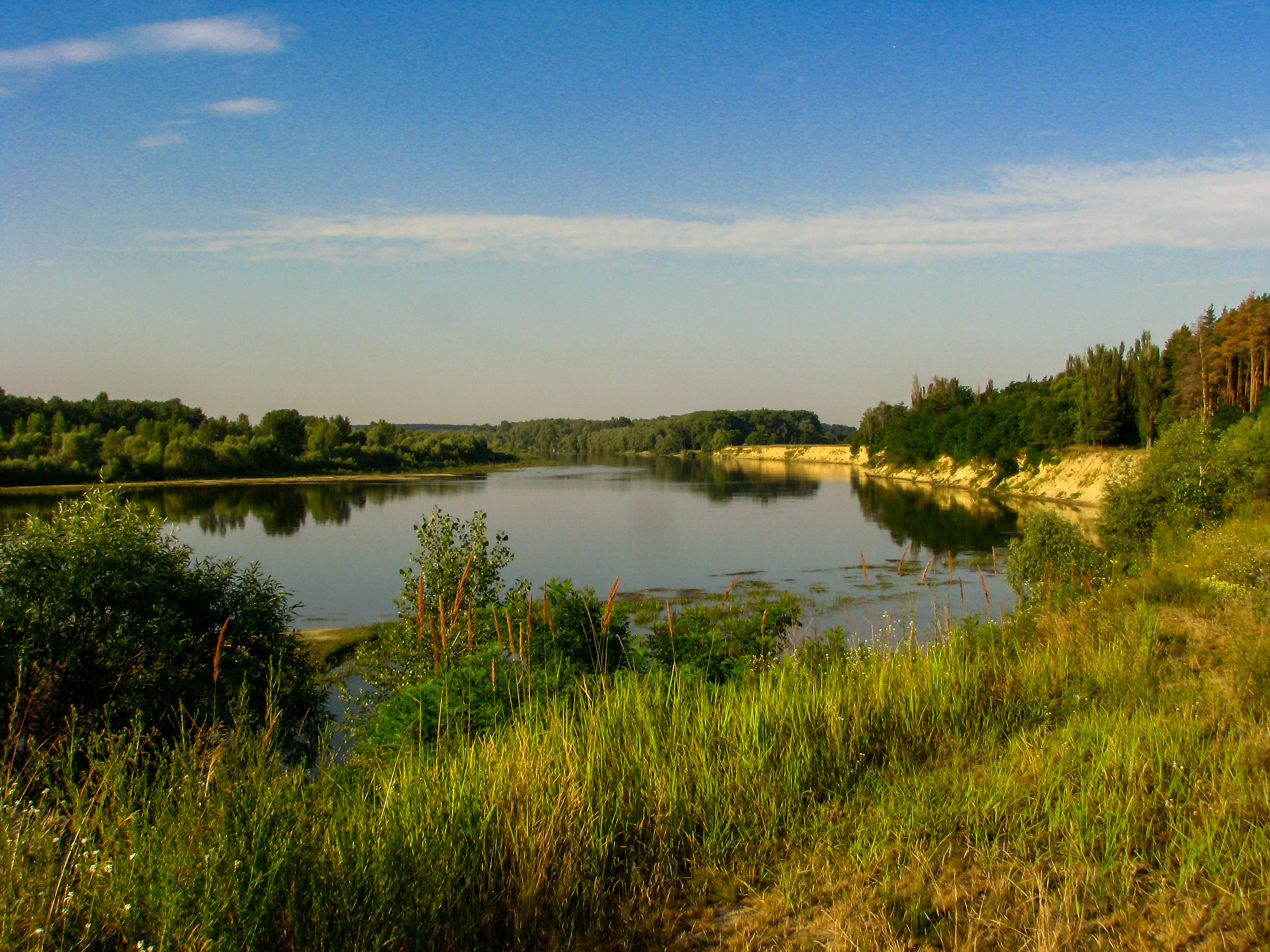
- Mizhrichynskyi Regional Landscape Park

- Location within Ukraine
- Location: Chernihiv Oblast
- Nearest city: Oster, Chernihiv
- Coordinates: 51°06′21″N 30°49′20″E
- Area: 10,247,295 hectares (25,321,617 acres; 102,473 km^{2}; 39,565 sq mi)
- Established: 2002
- Governing body: Ministry of Ecology and Natural Resources (Ukraine)

The Mizhrichynskyi Regional Landscape Park (Ukrainian: Міжрічинський регіональний ландшафтний парк) is the largest regional landscape park in Ukraine. It was founded in 2002 near the village Otrokhy in Kozelets Raion (currently in Chernihiv Raion) of Chernihiv Oblast. It is located between two large rivers, the Dnipro and Desna, from which the park's Ukrainian name meaning "between the rivers" is derived. Mizhrichynskiy Landscape Park has an area of more than 1,000 square kilometers in the south-eastern Chernihiv region. The Desna river forms the eastern boundary of the park, while the western and southern boundaries coincide with the border of Chernihiv region. There are many swamps, bogs and lakes.

== Flora and Fauna ==
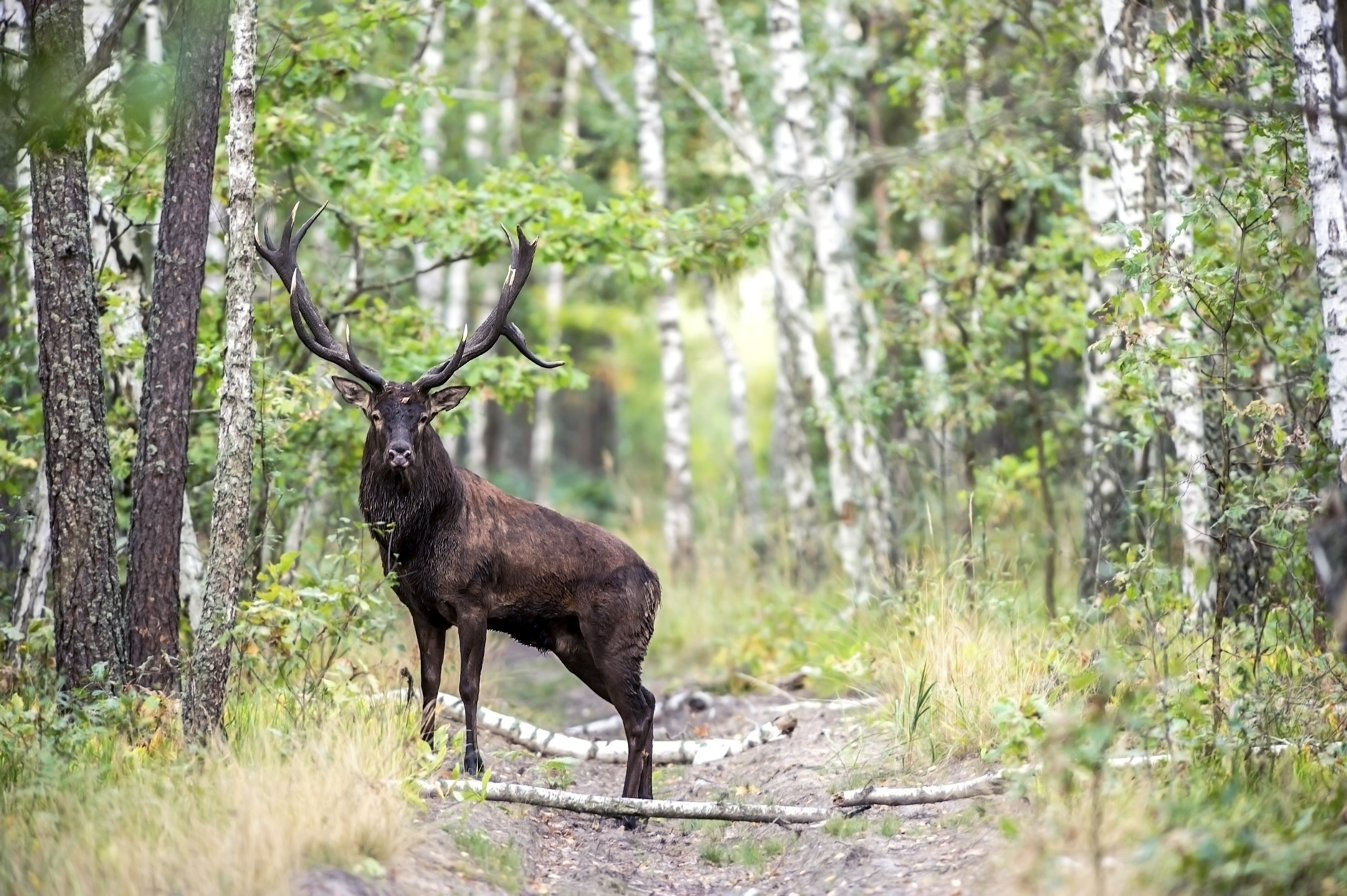
Stag in the park

The forest is mostly pine trees. The large wild area provides a habitat to many animals. There are many larger mammals in Mizhrichynskiy RLP such as red fox, moose, wolf, lynx, deer, roe deer, wild boar and others. There are 241 bird species, including 145 breeding species. White-tailed eagle, short-toed eagle, lesser spotted eagle, black kite, black stork, crane, black woodpecker, white-backed woodpecker and a lot of other rare birds breed here. It also provides important habitats for a variety of fish and insects. There are 65 rare plant species and 74 rare animal species in Mizhrichynskiy regional landscape park. There are two Important Bird Areas within Mizhrichynskyi Regional Landscape Park.

== Neighboring Nature Reserves ==
- Polesie State Radioecological Reserve
- Zahalʹnozoolohichnyy Zakaznyk (Загальнозоологічний заказник, General Zoological Reserve)
- Zalissia National Nature Park
