= Lypova Dolyna Raion =

Former subdivision of Sumy Oblast, Ukraine

Lypova Dolyna Raion Липоводолинський район
- Raion
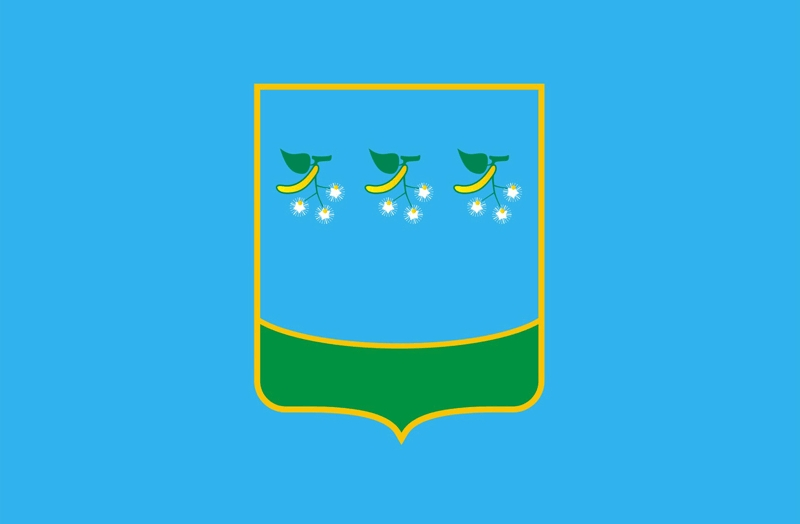
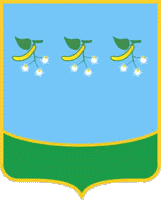
- Flag Coat of arms

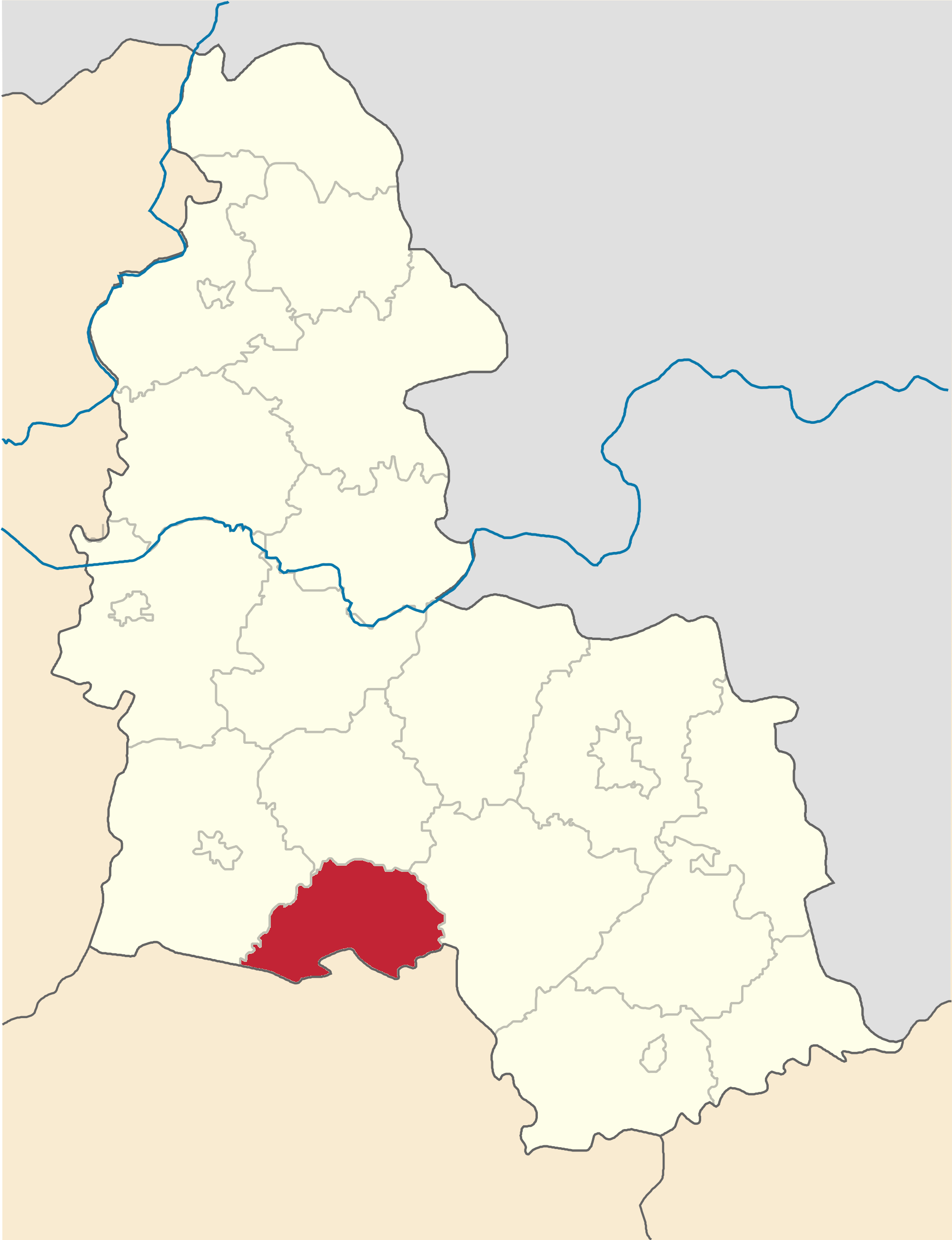
- Raion location in Sumy Oblast
- Coordinates: 50°35′33.1974″N 33°54′20.8368″E
- Country: Ukraine
- Oblast: Sumy Oblast
- Disestablished: 18 July 2020
- Admin. center: Lypova Dolyna

Area
  - Total: 900 km^{2} (350 sq mi)

Population (2020)
  - Total: 17,713
  - Density: 20/km^{2} (51/sq mi)
- Time zone: UTC+2 (EET)
  - Summer (DST): UTC+3 (EEST)
- Website: http://ldol.sm.gov.ua/

Lypova Dolyna Raion (Ukrainian: Липоводолинський район) was a raion in Sumy Oblast in Central Ukraine. The administrative center of the raion was the urban-type settlement of Lypova Dolyna. The raion was abolished on 18 July 2020 as part of the administrative reform of Ukraine, which reduced the number of raions of Sumy Oblast to five. The last estimate of the raion population was 17,713 (2020 est.).
