= Konotop Raion =

Subdivision of Sumy Oblast, Ukraine

Konotop Raion Конотопський район
- Raion
- Flag Coat of arms

- Raion location in Sumy Oblast
- Coordinates: 51°11′17.5338″N 33°17′53.9514″E
- Country: Ukraine
- Oblast: Sumy Oblast
- Admin. center: Konotop
- Subdivisions: 8 hromadas

Area
  - Total: 5,186.5 km^{2} (2,002.5 sq mi)

Population (2022)
  - Total: 194,408
  - Density: 37.483/km^{2} (97.082/sq mi)
- Time zone: UTC+2 (EET)
  - Summer (DST): UTC+3 (EEST)
- Website: http://knt.sm.gov.ua/index.php/uk/

Konotop Raion (Ukrainian: Конотопський район, [konoˈtɔpsʲkɪj rɐˈjɔn]) is a raion in Sumy Oblast in Central Ukraine. The administrative center of the raion is the town of Konotop. Population: 194,408 (2022 estimate).

On 18 July 2020, as part of the administrative reform of Ukraine, the number of raions of Sumy Oblast was reduced to five, and the area of Konotop Raion was significantly expanded. The January 2020 estimate of the raion population was 26,838 (2020 est.).

== Geography and climate ==
The area of the district is 5186.5 km^{2}. Konotop District is located on a flat area. The highest point of the district is 226 m, located on the slopes of the Central Russian Plain, which is located in the east of the district. The relief of the district is mostly lowland, covered with coniferous and broad-leaved forests and meadow steppes. Meadows grow in the floodplains of rivers. Konotop District has reserves of silt, sapropel, peat, quartzite.

The climate is moderately continental. Winter is cool, summer is not hot. The average temperature in July is +19 °C, in January -7.5 °C. The maximum precipitation falls in the summer in the form of rain. The average annual amount is from 550 to 650 mm, changing from west to east.

The Seym River (Desna Basin) flows through Konotop District from east to west. The river in the floodplain has many oxbow lakes. The forests of Konotop District are rich in mushrooms and berries. Among the mushrooms, chanterelles, tricholoma equestre, suillus luteus, armillaria mellea, russula and porcini mushrooms predominate. The most common berries are blueberries, raspberries, and blackberries.

Seymskiy Regional Landscape Park is located in Konotop District in the Seym Valley. There are numerous mammals in Seymskiy RLP such as elks, roe deer, foxes, wild boars, muskrats, racoon dogs, beavers, and the more rare bison and weasels, as well as others. There are many bird species, including the moorhen, spotted crakes, mallards, sand martins, white wagtails, and eurasian oystercatchers. Many other rare birds breed here as well.

== Communities of the district ==
Number of settlements 311. Number of cities – 4. The Konotop Raion includes 8 territorial communities. It includes: Konotop, Buryn, Krolevets, Putyvl urban communities, Duboviazivka, Bochechky, Popivka and Nova Sloboda rural territorial communities.

== Transport ==
A number of important transport corridors pass through the district, including the European highway E101. The railway in Konotop district runs from Konotop station in the direction of Kyiv, Kharkiv.

== Bibliography ==
- Національний атлас України/НАН України, Інститут географії, Державна служба геодезії, картографії та кадастру; голов. ред. Л. Г. Руденко; голова ред. кол.Б.Є. Патон. — К.: ДНВП «Картографія», 2007. — 435 с. — 5 тис.прим. — ISBN 978-966-475-067-4.
- Географічна енциклопедія України : [у 3 т.] / редкол.: О. М. Маринич (відповід. ред.) та ін. — К., 1989–1993. — 33 000 екз. — ISBN 5-88500-015-8.
