= Romny Raion =

Subdivision of Sumy Oblast, Ukraine

Romny Raion Роменський район
- Raion
- Flag Coat of arms

- Raion location in Sumy Oblast
- Coordinates: 50°43′54.249″N 33°24′42.2994″E
- Country: Ukraine
- Oblast: Sumy Oblast
- Admin. center: Romny
- Subdivisions: 8 hromadas

Area
  - Total: 3,882.1 km^{2} (1,498.9 sq mi)

Population (2022)
  - Total: 107,509
  - Density: 27.694/km^{2} (71.726/sq mi)
- Time zone: UTC+2 (EET)
  - Summer (DST): UTC+3 (EEST)
- Website: http://rmn.sm.gov.ua/

Romny Raion (Ukrainian: Роменський район) is a raion in Sumy Oblast in Central Ukraine. The administrative center of the raion is the town of Romny. Population: 107,509 (2022 estimate).

On 18 July 2020, as part of the administrative reform of Ukraine, the number of raions of Sumy Oblast was reduced to five, and the area of Romny Raion was significantly expanded. The January 2020 estimate of the raion population was 30,876 (2020 est.).

== Geographic characteristics ==
The area of the district is 3882.1 km^{2}. Romny Raion is located on the slopes of the Dnieper Lowland.

Romny Raion has reserves of silt, sapropel, peat, oil, natural gas, potash salt.

The climate is moderately continental. Winter is cool, summer is not hot. The average temperature in July is +19 °C, in January -7.5 °C. The maximum precipitation falls in the summer in the form of rain. The average annual amount is from 650 to 700 mm, changing from west to east.

Sula, left tributary of the Dnipro flow through the Romny district. The river in the floodplain has many oxbow lakes and artificial lakes.

Romny district is located in the forest-steppe natural zone. Among the trees in the forests, oaks, lindens, and maples dominate. The district is home to 240 species of birds, the rarest of which are the bustard, steppe eagle, and white swans. The fauna of the region includes 55 species of mammals. Typical large mammals are elk, roe deer, wild boar, squirrels, beavers, hares and wolves. The forests of Romny Raion are rich in mushrooms and berries. Among the mushrooms, chanterelles, tricholoma equestre, suillus luteus, armillaria mellea, russula and porcini mushrooms predominate. The most common berries are blueberries, raspberries, and blackberries.

Two hydrological reserves of state importance are located in the district.

== Communities of the district ==
Number of settlements 297. Number of cities – 1. The Romny Raion includes 8 territorial communities. It includes: Romensky city community, Lypovodolynsky, Nedryhaylivsky settlement and Andriyashivsky, Vilshansky, Korovynsky, Synivsky and Khmelivsky rural territorial communities.

== Transport ==
The district is crossed by railway tracks and highways from Kyiv and Poltava to Sumy.

== Bibliography ==
- Національний атлас України/НАН України, Інститут географії, Державна служба геодезії, картографії та кадастру; голов. ред. Л. Г. Руденко; голова ред. кол.Б.Є. Патон. — К.: ДНВП «Картографія», 2007. — 435 с. — 5 тис.прим. — ISBN 978-966-475-067-4.
- Географічна енциклопедія України : [у 3 т.] / редкол.: О. М. Маринич (відповід. ред.) та ін. — К., 1989—1993. — 33 000 екз. — ISBN 5-88500-015-8.
