= Atynske =

Village in Sumy Oblast, Ukraine

Atynske Атинське
- Village
- Interactive map of Atynske
- Location of Atynske Atynske (Ukraine)
- Coordinates: 51°14′4″N 34°16′6″E
- Country: Ukraine
- Oblast: Sumy Oblast
- Raion: Sumy Raion
- Hromada: Bilopillia urban hromada
- Elevation: 133 m (436 ft)

Population (2001)
  - Total: 143
- Time zone: UTC+2
  - Summer (DST): UTC+3
- Postal code: 41851
- Area code: +380 5443

Atynske is a village in Ukraine, in the Bilopillia urban hromada of Sumy Raion, Sumy Oblast.

== Geography ==
Located 1.5 km from the right bank of the Vyr River. The village consists of 2 parts, separated by 1 km. At a distance of 1.5 km are the villages of Ryzhivka, Golishivs'ke and Stukalyvka. The border with Russia is 2 km away.

== History ==
On June 12, 2020, in accordance with the Resolution of the Cabinet of Ministers of Ukraine No. 723-r "On the Determination of Administrative Centers and Approval of Territories of Territorial Communities of Sumy Region", it became part of the Bilopillia urban hromada.

On July 19, 2020, as a result of the administrative-territorial reform and liquidation of the Bilopillia Raion, the village became part of the newly formed Sumy Raion.

=== Russo-Ukrainian War ===
On April 23, 2022, at 3:30 p.m., artillery shelling of the village was carried out from the Tyotkino customs checkpoint on the border with Russia. 5 arrivals of 82-caliber mines were recorded, as well as shots and hits from the KPVT — a large-caliber Vladimirov machine gun, which is on armored personnel carriers in the Russian Federation. The first arrival of the Russian mine was in the garden of the boarding school. After it, the staff and wards of the boarding school managed to get down. A crater remained from the next mine, which fell near the dining room. As a result, all the windows and doors were broken in the psychoneurological boarding school. Fragments of the mine pierced the walls, lockers in the corridor, passed through the next wooden door and got stuck somewhere in the ceiling. There were no victims.

On April 26, 2022, the prosecutor's office announced that a pre-trial investigation had been launched into the shelling of the Atynsk Psychoneurological Boarding School. According to law enforcement officials, servicemen of the Russian Armed Forces used means of warfare prohibited by international law.

On March 19, 2024, the village came under fire from the Russian aggressor five times. The attacks were carried out by artillery, 120 and 82 mm mortars and tanks.

On July 29, 2024, the settlement was once again shelled by Russian troops. 1 explosion was recorded, probably an FPV drone; 8 explosions, probably an 82 mm mortar.

On August 27, 2024, according to the General Staff of the Ukrainian Armed Forces, the enemy carried out airstrikes on the areas of the settlements of Esman, Vorozhba, Vil'na Sloboda, Atynske, Gorile, Bezsalivka, Hlukhiv, Mykhailivs'ke, Uhroidy, Shalyhyne, Yampil, Iastrubine, Iskryskivshchyna, Bilopillia, Bachivs'k and Budіvel'ne in Sumy Oblast. The Operational Command North informs about the shelling of the village. 3 explosions were recorded, probably KAB; 15 explosions, probably 82 mm mortar.

== Demographics ==
According to data for 1864, the state farm of Atynsk, Sumsky Uyezd, Kharkov Governorate, had a population of 64 people (29 males and 35 females), and there were 7 household farms.

According to the 2001 Ukrainian census, the village's population was 143 people. The main languages of the village were:

- Ukrainian 87.25%
- Russian 12.75%
