= Iskryskivshchyna =

Village in Sumy Oblast, Ukraine

Iskryskivshchyna Іскрисківщина
- Village
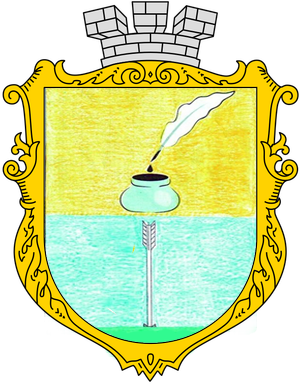
- Seal
- Interactive map of Iskryskivshchyna
- Location of Iskryskivshchyna Iskryskivshchyna (Ukraine)
- Coordinates: 51°14′16″N 34°22′17″E
- Country: Ukraine
- Oblast: Sumy Oblast
- Raion: Sumy Raion
- Hromada: Bilopillia urban hromada
- Founded: 1630s
- Elevation: 174 m (571 ft)

Population (2001)
  - Total: 635
- Time zone: UTC+2
  - Summer (DST): UTC+3
- Postal code: 41821
- Area code: +380 5443

Iskryskivshchyna is a village in Bilopillia urban hromada, Sumy Raion, Sumy Oblast, Ukraine. Until 2020, the local government body was the Iskryskivshchyna Village Council.

== Geography ==
The village of Iskryskivshchyna is located on the right bank of the Volfa River, upstream at a distance of 1.5 km is the village of Budky, downstream at a distance of 2 km is the village of Bezsalivka. 0.5 km away was the village of Sorokyne before being removed from the register in 1988.

The river dries up in this place. A stream flows through the village, which dries up with rapids.

The border with Russia is 1 km away.

There is a railway nearby, a stop at the 312th kilometer.

== History ==
It was first mentioned in historical sources in 1732, as a settlement of the Bilopillia centurion F. Kukol. Founded in 1690 by the Bilopillia cornetman Adam (Dmytro) Skrytsky, as a settlement of 5 courtyards. In 1722, it became the property of the Bilopillia centurion Fyodor Stepanovich Kukol-Yasnopolsky.

In 1880, the landowner, sugar producer I. M. Tereshchenko bought the first 130 dessiatines of land around the village. After 2 years, he opened his dairy and meat farm. And in 1884, at the farm, he founded an "agricultural school" specializing in "land managers" growing sugar beets for his own sugar factories. For all these almost 130 years, only agricultural specialists studied at the school. Now these are tractor drivers - machinists, fitters of agricultural machines.

During the years of Soviet rule, the wooden buildings of the school, warehouses, even the well has been providing water for the school and the farm for more than 100 years. In the park in the center of the village are the burial places of members of the Tereshchenko family, including the founder of the school, Ivan Mykolovych Tereshchenko.

The village suffered as a result of the Holodomor carried out by the Soviet Union in 1923–1933 and in 1946–1947, because the Russian village of Tyotkino was located nearby, whose bazaar helped the Iskrisiv residents with food, and the collective farms had orphanages, which saved many children from starvation. Archival documents have found 5 families who died during the Holodomor of 1932–1933.

By the mid-20th century, about 2,000 people lived in the village.

FAP (formerly a hospital), secondary school, college, chain of stores. House of Culture (opened in a new building in 1991, renovated in 2017). The adjacent lands are fully cultivated. The community funds the ongoing repair of roads, other infrastructure, and restoration of cultural monuments.

On June 12, 2020, in accordance with the Resolution of the Cabinet of Ministers of Ukraine No. 723-r "On the Determination of Administrative Centers and Approval of Territories of Territorial Communities of Sumy Region", it became part of the Bilopillia urban hromada.

On July 19, 2020, as a result of the administrative-territorial reform and liquidation of the Bilopillia Raion, the village became part of the newly formed Sumy Raion.

=== Russo-Ukrainian War ===
In 2023, the village was subjected to mortar shelling by Russian forces, as a result of which on January 1, 2023, the 19th-century Varvarin Church, a monument to Soviet soldiers, the building of the Starosta okruh and the House of Culture were damaged.

On March 19, 2024, the village was twice shelled by Russian forces. The shelling was carried out by artillery, 120 and 82 mm mortars, and tanks.

On May 24, 2024, 1 explosion was recorded in the village from the side of Russian forces, probably an FPV drone.

On June 24, 2024, according to information from the North Military District, the settlement was shelled by Russian forces. 8 explosions were recorded, probably from a 120 mm mortar.

On June 30, 2024, the Operational Command North reported another shelling of the village. 2 explosions were recorded, probably from a 120 mm mortar.

On August 2, 2024, at around 1 a.m., Russian forces attacked the village with FPV drones. One of the drones hit a residential building, causing a fire.

On August 11, 2024, the village was once again shelled by the aggressor. According to the operational command "North", 2 attacks were recorded: 14 explosions, probably an 82 mm mortar.

On August 26, 2024, Russian invaders continued to shell the border territories of Sumy Oblast. In particular, 4 explosions were recorded in the village, probably from a 120 mm mortar.

On August 27, 2024, according to the General Staff of the Ukrainian Armed Forces, the enemy carried out airstrikes on the areas of the settlements of Esman, Vorozhba, Vilna Sloboda, Atynske, Horile, Bezsalivka, Hlukhiv, Mykhailivske, Uhroidy, Shalyhyne, Yampil, Yastrubyne, Iskryskivshchyna, Bilopillia, Bachivsk and Budіvelne in Sumy Oblast. The Operational Command North informs about the shelling of the village. 3 explosions were recorded, probably KAB; 15 explosions, probably 82 mm mortar.

== Attractions ==
At the expense of centurion Fyodor Kukol-Yasnopolsky and his sons, the Church of the Great Martyr Barbara was built in the center of the village in 1745. As of 1750, the church had 686 parishioners.

In 1852, at the expense of one of the descendants of F. Kukol, Staff Captain Mykola Kukol-Yasnopolsky, with contributions from parishioners, a new church of St. Barbara was built on the site of the previous one. The church is wooden on a brick foundation, single-domed, single-pew. After 1917, the church was closed for services, in 1925 the cross and bells were removed from the church, and the premises themselves were adapted by Bolshevik activists for a club.

After the construction of the House of Culture in 1991, the church was transferred to a religious community. At the end of 2018, the church was not operational, the monument was never rebuilt in its original form (there is currently no bathhouse). The priest's house was transferred to a medical and obstetrics station. As a result of Russian shelling of the Bilopil community on January 1, 2023, the church of St. Barbara was damaged.

== Symbolics ==
The predecessor project is based on the Iskrytsky family coat of arms from 1800 [ 17 ], which was granted to them by the Emperor of Russia.

The Iskrytski family received their first coat of arms in 1659 from the Polish king John II Casimir Vasa.

To avoid heraldic errors, the feather was painted black, and the crown was replaced with a rustic one.

The village coat of arms depicts an inkwell with a goose feather and a silver arrow stuck in the ground. The inkwell with a goose feather is the emblem of the old vocational school, which is more than 135 years old. The silver village coat of arms is taken from the coat of arms of the founders of the village, the landowners Iskrytsky (Skrytsky).

== Demographics ==
According to the 2001 Ukrainian census, the village's population was 635 people. The main languages of the village were:

- Ukrainian 93.19%
- Russian 6.19%
- Armenian 0.62%

In 2024, the population of the village was 38 people.

== Notable people ==
The following were born in the village:

- Yevgeniy Ivchenko – a medalist at the 1980 Summer Olympics in the 50 km walk.
- Borys Pavlivskyi – Ukrainian poet and journalist, born on the farm Podobryivka near Iskryskivshchyna.
- Vladimir Vlasenko – the Minister of State Farms of Kazakhstan during the period of virgin land reclamation from 1953 to 1961.
- Vyacheslav Vyrovets – a professor, doctor of agricultural sciences, a well-known agronomist, and breeder. In 1956, he graduated from the Iskryskivshchyna Agricultural College, Faculty of Agronomy. His entire professional life was associated with the breeding and cultivation of non-narcotic hemp varieties.
- Yevgeny Ivchenko – a famous Soviet track and field athlete, bronze medalist of the 1980 Summer Olympics in the 50 km race walk. He won the bronze medal at the age of 42.
