= Northern Ukraine border skirmishes =

Border skirmishes in the Russo-Ukrainian war

- Part of the Russian invasion of Ukraine
Date	29 March 2022 – present (4 years, 4 months, 3 weeks and 3 days)
Location	Sumy Oblast and Chernihiv Oblast, Ukraine, Kursk Oblast, Belgorod Oblast and Bryansk Oblast, Russia
Result	Ongoing
Territorial changes	Ukrainian forces launch the Kursk offensive and get pushed back by Russia; Russian forces start incursions into the neighboring Sumy Oblast

Belligerents
Russia	Ukraine: Russian opposition; Belarusian militants; Polish militants; Chechen Opposition; Battlegroup Getica

Units involved
Russian Border Guard; 322nd Spetsnaz Training Center	(Ukraine) Ukrainian Border Guard; Steel Border Brigade; Chernihiv Border Detachment; Sumy Border Detachment; Russian Volunteer Corps; Freedom of Russia Legion; Sibir Battalion; Polish Volunteer Corps; Belarusian Volunteer Corps; Separate Special Purpose Battalion

Casualties and losses
- 4 civilians killed, 3 injured

A series of border skirmishes has taken place along the Russia–Ukraine border in Sumy and Chernihiv Oblasts since the withdrawal of Russian troops from northern Ukraine. Ukrainian officials have stated that strikes across the border happen daily.

== Background ==
By the 4th of April 2022, Russian forces had withdrawn from the Sumy Oblast following the failure of the Russian offensive towards Kyiv, but shelling still continued across the border.

== Incidents ==
=== March 2022 ===
Local authorities in the Kursk Oblast announced on 29 March that a border checkpoint had been shelled from Ukrainian territory. The location in Ukraine from which the shelling was carried out was reportedly struck in return.

The same day, according to Sumy Oblast governor Dmytro Zhyvytskyi, the Russian military blew up one of its own BTRs at the Ryzhivka border checkpoint, in order to provide a justification to destroy the Ukrainian border post there.

=== April 2022 ===
The governor of the Kursk Oblast announced that a border post in the Sudzhansky District had been shelled by mortars on 5 April, and that the points of origin, presumably in Ukraine, had been fired on in retaliation. On 9 April, he announced that another border post had been shelled by mortars, this time in Yelizavetovka. The Russian border service and military returned fire into Ukraine.

On 14 April, the Russian military shelled the village of Popivka, Okhtyrka Raion.

According to the Ukrainian Border Guard Service, Russian troops fired at the Chernihiv Oblast twice on 28 April. The following day, more than 30 mortars were fired into the Sumy Oblast from the Russian settlement of Gorodishche. Explosions were reported in the Shostka Raion.

=== May 2022 ===
The Russian military shelled Hlukhiv with rocket launchers on 8-9 May, damaging a Jewish cemetery.

On 12 May, a civilian was killed due to the shelling. On 13 May, Russia fired on a border village in the Shostka district using unguided air missiles.

As shelling continued, Russian forces defeated a few elements of the Ukrainian Border Guard and entered Shostka district on 16 May. Fighting continued until 17 May, when the Russian forces withdrew.

On 17 May 2022, an airstrike by the Russian Air Force hit the Desna barracks in Desna, killing 87. The next day, ten explosions were heard in Hlukhiv.

On 21 May, 6 Russian air strikes and artillery hit the border settlement of Kucherivka.

Planes of the Russian Air Force hit two villages in Shostka on 24 May.

On 28 May, Russian warplanes targeted the Ukrainian border and fired on the border with mortars from the Russian village of Troebortnoe.

Russian forces used flechettes on border villages in the Shostka district on 30 May. The flechettes were used to previously kill civilians in Bucha during the Battle of Bucha earlier in the war. Russian forces shelled a village all night. According to Kyiv Independent, Russian forces shelled at the border more than 20 times from the Russian village of Zyornovo.

=== June 2022 ===
On 4 June, Russian aircraft destroyed a locality on the border from 6 missiles being deployed in Mykolayivka. Three hours later explosions blew up across Velyka Pysarivka Raion in Sumy Oblast. Shelling was also reported in Novhorod-Siversky Raion in Chernihiv Oblast.

On 8 June, Russian forces destroyed a building of the Ukrainian Border Control from the Russian border checkpoint of Troebortnoe.

Russian forces fired 7 times on 10 June. The mortars and artillery were fired from Zyornovo and Strachovo in Bryansk Oblast. Around four villages were destroyed in Sumy and Chernihiv Oblasts.

On 19 June, Russian forces fired mortars on the city of Seredyna-Buda in Sumy Oblast. A huge fire was caused and residents had to evacuate the city.

Russian forces fired 20 missiles into the town of Desna in Chernihiv Oblast on 25 June. Ukrainian officials claimed that the Russian military had fired the missiles from Belarus.

One person was killed and one injured as Russian troops fired on Yunakivka, Bilopillia, Krasnopillia and Shalyhyne on 26 June in Sumy Oblast. Around 150 projectiles were launched with Krasnopillia suffering the most, as Zhyvytskyi said "it was destroyed."

On June 27, Zhyvytskyi stated that Russians attacked the hromadas of Krasnopillia and Bilopillia, leaving one person injured.

Shots were heard in Krasnopilla, Velyka Pysarivka, and Khotin on 30 June. Around 70 shots were fired on Krasnopilla, 10 missile strikes on Velyka Pysarivka, and 120mm mortars on Khotin. Mortar strikes were also reported in Semenivka.

=== July 2022 ===
Russian forces shelled numerous border towns including Hlukhiv on July 1.

Russian forces fired with artillery and mortars on Sumy Oblast 3 times on 3 July. Russian forces fired at Shalyhyne in Shostka Raion with 12 strikes recorded. Russian troops then fired on Esman. Later that day, 14 mortar projectiles were launched again on Shalyhyne.

On 4 July, a Russian helicopter fired at an Esman school.

On 5 July, Russian troops launched a missile strike on the city of Shostka in which private enterprises were destroyed and around 24 residential buildings were damaged. Russian forces also fired on Semenivka in Chernihiv Oblast.

Russian forces fired on Shalyhyne, Bilopillia, Znob-Novhorodske and Krasnopillia on 12 July with Krasnopillia getting hit twice with rocket launchers.

On 13 July, four villages in Sumy Oblast were shelled.

On 16 July, Russian forces destroyed a farm and a school in Esman.

On 17 July, Russian troops shelled Velyka Pysarivka, Krasnopillia, Khotin, Bilopillia, Shalyhyne, Nova Sloboda, Sumy Oblast, Esman, and Seredyna-Buda in Sumy Oblast as well as Snovsk in Chernihiv Oblast.

Explosions were reported on Hlukhiv on 18 July, with no casualties reported. Shalyhyne also suffered attacks as well as Khotin. Mykolayivka was attacked from MRLS.

On 24 July, Russian forces fired at the Sumy Oblast 12 times, primarily the villages of Shalyhyne, Mykolayivka, Bilopillia, Khotin, Yunakivka, and Krasnopillia. One person was reportedly killed and 2 military aircraft fired on Mykolayivka. Later that day, Ukrainian officials admitted that Sumy and Chernihiv Oblasts were fired on every day.

Explosions were heard across the border with Sumy Oblast where 55 were reported on 26 July. One woman was injured. The villages targeted were Esman, Krasnopillia, and Seredyna-Buda. Explosions were also heard in Chernihiv Oblast Over 20 explosions were reported.

Russian forces shelled Sumy Oblast 44 times on 28 July. The same day Russian forces on Belarusian territory launched missiles on Honcharivske in Chernihiv Oblast.

Russian troops heavily shelled Semenivka in Chernihiv Oblast on 29 July. The city's administrative building was heavily damaged.

=== March 2024 ===
On 17 March, a Ukrainian Mil Mi-24 helicopter was shot down in Sumy Oblast near the Russia–Ukraine border.

On the same day, Russian sabotage groups failed to cross the border into Sumy after Ukrainian forces intercepted them.

=== June 2024 ===
Ukrainian forces struck Russian military targets on 1 and 2 June in Belgorod and Kursk oblasts, including a column of Russian vehicles in Sudzha. Ukrainian sources stated that the column consisted of 18 Russian vehicles. Additionally, Russian governmental and milblogger sources reported that a Ukrainian MLRS strike on Shebekino killed the Deputy Head of Korochansky Raion, Igor Nechiporenko, and injured several other local administrators. Both Russian and Ukrainian sources reported on 2 June that both sides were transferring personnel to the Sumy-Kursk border.

On 9 June, a Ukrainian fixed-wing crewed aircraft struck a Russian command post in Belgorod Oblast, marking the first time a crewed Ukrainian airplane has performed a strike on Russian territory.

On 9 June, Ramzan Kadyrov, the head of Chechnya, stated that the Russians captured the village of Ryzhivka in Sumy Oblast of Ukraine, located near the border, next to the Russian settlement of Tyotkino. The Ukrainian State Border Guard Service and President Zelenskyy denied that the village was under Chechen control. Geolocated footage confirmed that Russian forces had entered the village and had advanced 730 meters inside Ukraine. The ISW assessed that the incursions "have not established a significant or enduring presence in this area".

By 12 June, Ukrainian State Border Guard Service Spokesmen Andriy Demchenko stated that there was "almost no" activity of Russian forces operating in the Sumy direction.

=== July 2024 ===
On 1 July, geolocated footage showed Ukrainian forces engaged in combat with another Russian cross-border raiding party at Zhuravka in Sumy Oblast. The Ukrainian General Staff reported the next day that Russian forces were conducting sabotage and reconnaissance activities in Sumy and Chernihiv oblasts. Geolocated footage showed a limited Russian presence in the forest outside Zhuravka.

On 3 July, Russian forces continued to launch limited cross-border raids in Sumy oblast, with the oblast's head Volodymyr Artyukh reporting that the Russian forces weren't large enough to warrant a full incursion. The ISW assessed that the raids were meant to distract Ukraine and draw resources from the front north of Kharkiv.

On 18 July, Russian forces reportedly conducted a limited and unsuccessful cross-border raid into Sumy Oblast, failing to break through to Chuikivka, Rozhkovychi, and Sytne.

On 31 July, a Russian insider source claimed that Ukrainian forces had ambushed elements of the Russian 322nd Spetsnaz Training Center in the Semenivskyi Raion, Chernihiv Oblast border area. The report claimed that 5 Russian Spetsnaz personnel were killed in the ambush, and that it had been covered up in order to save face in the wake of the defeat of Wagner personnel at an incident in Mali.

=== August 2024 ===
On 9 August, Russian authorities said that one person was killed in an aerial attack on the border town of Shebekino which also injured two people and damaged nine apartment buildings, 18 houses and 10 vehicles.

=== November 2024 ===
On 15 November, a Russian sabotage and reconnaissance group conducted a limited incursion into Chernihiv Oblast raising the Russian flag over an abandoned apartment building without establishing any permanent presence in the villages of Hremyach, Kolos, Novoselydivka and Muravi. The Ukrainian State Border Service reported that the area where the raid took place is cut off from the rest of Ukraine by a river and are abandoned. The next day, Ukrainian drones destroyed the Russian flags in Chernihiv.

=== December 2024 ===
On 9 December 2024, Russian troops re-entered Sumy Oblast.

=== January 2025 ===
On 10 January 2025, geolocated footage showed Russian forces crossing the international border and entering Sumy Oblast, advancing west of Zhuravka and south of the village of Prokhody. Ivan Shevtsov, spokesman for Ukraine’s Steel Border Brigade said on 14 January 2025 that Russian drones were actively hunting Ukrainian soldiers in Sumy Oblast and that the brigade was "in areas of active combat in Sumy Oblast and along the state border with Russia".

=== March 2025 ===
On 7 March 2025, geolocated footage showed that Russian forces had advanced northwest of Basivka and were concentrating forces in Novenke.

== See also ==
- Attacks in Russia during the Russian invasion of Ukraine
