= Hyrine =

Village in Sumy Oblast, Ukraine

Hyrine Гиріне
- Village
- Interactive map of Hyrine
- Location of Hyrine Hyrine (Ukraine)
- Coordinates: 51°11′9″N 34°20′59″E
- Country: Ukraine
- Oblast: Sumy Oblast
- Raion: Sumy Raion
- Hromada: Bilopillia urban hromada
- Elevation: 151 m (495 ft)

Population (2001)
  - Total: 58
- Time zone: UTC+2
  - Summer (DST): UTC+3
- Postal code: 41821
- Area code: +380 5443

Hyrine (Ukrainian: Гиріне) is a village in Bilopillia urban hromada, Sumy Raion, Sumy Oblast, Ukraine. Until 2020, the local government body was the Hurynivka Village Council.

== Geography ==
The village of Hyrine is located 3 km from the Kryha River, near the place where it flows into the Vyr River. The city of Bilopillia and the villages of Novoivanivka and Sokhany are located 2 km away .

A stream flows through the village, which dries up with the tide.

== History ==
The village suffered as a result of the Holodomor carried out by the Soviet Union in 1923–1933 and in 1946–1947.

On June 12, 2020, in accordance with the Resolution of the Cabinet of Ministers of Ukraine No. 723-r "On the Determination of Administrative Centers and Approval of Territories of Territorial Communities of Sumy Region", it became part of the Bilopillia urban hromada.

On July 19, 2020, as a result of the administrative-territorial reform and liquidation of the Bilopillia Raion, the village became part of the newly formed Sumy Raion.

=== Russo-Ukrainian War ===
On April 25, 2022, during a joint patrol in the evening, servicemen of the Armed Forces of Ukraine and border guards heard 7 shots, most likely from a mortar, that exploded near the village of Hyrine. No servicemen were injured as a result of the said shelling.

On May 24, 2024, 2 shellings were recorded on the village from Russian forces: 26 explosions, probably 152 mm artillery.

== Demographics ==
According to the 2001 Ukrainian census, the village's population was 58 people. The main languages of the village were:

- Ukrainian 87.93%
- Russian 12.07%
