= Loknya =

Loknya (Russian: Локня) or Loknia (Ukrainian: Локня) may refer to:

== Populated places ==
- Loknya, Pskov Oblast, urban locality in Loknyansky District of Pskov Oblast, Russia
- Loknya, Belgorod Oblast, village in Yakovlevsky District of Belgorod Oblast, Russia
- Loknya, Bryansk Oblast, village in Krasnorogsky Selsoviet of Pochepsky District of Bryansk Oblast, Russia
- Loknya, Kursk Oblast, settlement in Lebedevsky Selsoviet of Sudzhansky District of Kursk Oblast, Russia
- Loknya, Ryazan Oblast, village in Slobodskoy Rural Okrug of Mikhaylovsky District of Ryazan Oblast, Russia
- Loknia, Konotop Raion, village in Konotop Raion of Sumy Oblast, Ukraine
- Loknia, Romny Raion, village in Romny Raion of Sumy Oblast, Ukraine
- Loknia, Sumy Raion, village in Sumy Raion of Sumy Oblast, Ukraine

== Rivers ==
- Loknya (Lovat tributary), left tributary of the Lovat in Pskov Oblast, Russia
- Loknya (Sudzha tributary), right tributary of the Sudzha in Kursk Oblast, Russia, and Sumy Oblast, Ukraine
- Loknya, Ryazan Oblast, right tributary of the Pronya, Russia
- Loknia (Kleven tributary, Krolevets Raion), Krolevets Raion, Ukraine, right tributary of the Kleven
- Loknya (Kleven tributary, Bryansk Oblast), Bryansk Oblast, Russia, as well as in Shostka Raion, Ukraine, right tributary of the Kleven
- Loknia (Vyr tributary), Sumy Oblast, left tributary of the Vyr, Ukraine
