= Novi Vyrky =

Village in Sumy Oblast, Ukraine

Novi Vyrky Нові Вирки
- Village
- Interactive map of Novi Vyrky
- Location of Novi Vyrky Novi Vyrky (Ukraine)
- Coordinates: 51°13′16″N 34°10′9″E
- Country: Ukraine
- Oblast: Sumy Oblast
- Raion: Sumy Raion
- Hromada: Bilopillia urban hromada
- Founded: 1630s
- Elevation: 146 m (479 ft)

Population (2001)
  - Total: 440
- Time zone: UTC+2
  - Summer (DST): UTC+3
- Postal code: 41817
- Area code: +380 5443

Novi Vyrky is a village in Bilopillia urban hromada, Sumy Raion, Sumy Oblast, Ukraine. Until 2020, the local government body was the Novi Vyrky Village Council.

== Geography ==
The village of Novi Vyrky is located on the left bank of the Vyr River at the place where it flows into the Seym River. The village of Stari Vyrky adjoins it upstream, the village of Pisky is located 2.5 km downstream, and the village of Manukhivka is located on the opposite bank.

Nearby is the regional highway T 1908. 6 km from the village is the Vorozhba railway station.

== History ==
The village was founded in the 1630s of the 17th century. A Slavic settlement from the 7th–8th centuries was discovered near the village.

The village suffered as a result of the Holodomor carried out by the Soviet Union in 1923–1933 and in 1946–1947.

On June 12, 2020, in accordance with the Resolution of the Cabinet of Ministers of Ukraine No. 723-r "On the Determination of Administrative Centers and Approval of Territories of Territorial Communities of Sumy Region", it became part of the Bilopillia urban hromada.

On July 19, 2020, as a result of the administrative-territorial reform and liquidation of the Bilopillia Raion, the village became part of the newly formed Sumy Raion.

=== Russo-Ukrainian War ===
On the morning of May 12, 2022, about 20 heavy artillery hits (presumably from a self-propelled artillery mount (SAM)) were recorded from the village of Tyotkino in Russia and in the territory of the village of Novi Vyrky. According to the State Border Guard Service, the shells exploded at a distance of about 6 km from the state border. A 67-year-old local resident died from Russian shelling, according to the head of the Sumy OVA, Dmytro Zhyvytskyi. Later, under the procedural leadership of the Sumy District Prosecutor's Office, a pre-trial investigation was initiated into the fact of violation of the laws and customs of war, combined with intentional murder (Part 2 of Article 438 of the Criminal Code of Ukraine). The pre-trial investigation is being carried out by Police Department No. 1 in Bilopillia of the Sumy District Police Department of the Main Directorate of the National Police in Sumy region.

On July 19, 2024, Russian troops shelled the village. Two explosions were recorded, probably the release of explosives from a UAV.

On August 10, 2024, the village was again subject to Russian attacks. According to the Operational Command North, 6 explosions were recorded, probably 122 mm artillery shells.

== Demographics ==
According to data from 1862, the state-owned village of Putivlsky Uyezd of Kursk Governorate had a population of 748 people (369 men and 379 women), and there were 70 households.

As of 1880, the former state village of Hlushetska Volost had a population of 1,077 people and 140 households.

According to the 2001 Ukrainian census, the village's population was 58 people. The main languages of the village were:

- Russian 66.97%
- Ukrainian 32.80%
- Other/not specified 0.23%

== Fauna ==
The Russian desman, typical of animals in the Vyr River region, can be found in the village..

== Notable people ==
- Volodymyr Volin (1971–2014) - A junior sergeant of the Armed Forces of Ukraine, a participant in the War in Donbas.
- Dermilov Stepanovych (1924–1989) - Honored Builder of the Ukrainian Soviet Socialist Republic, holder of the Order of the Red Banner of Labour.
- Agripyna Parmuzina (1883–1974) - Innovator of agricultural production, employee of the collective farm "Bolshevik", Hero of Socialist Labour.
