= Sopych =

Village in Sumy Oblast, Ukraine

Sopych Сопич
- Village
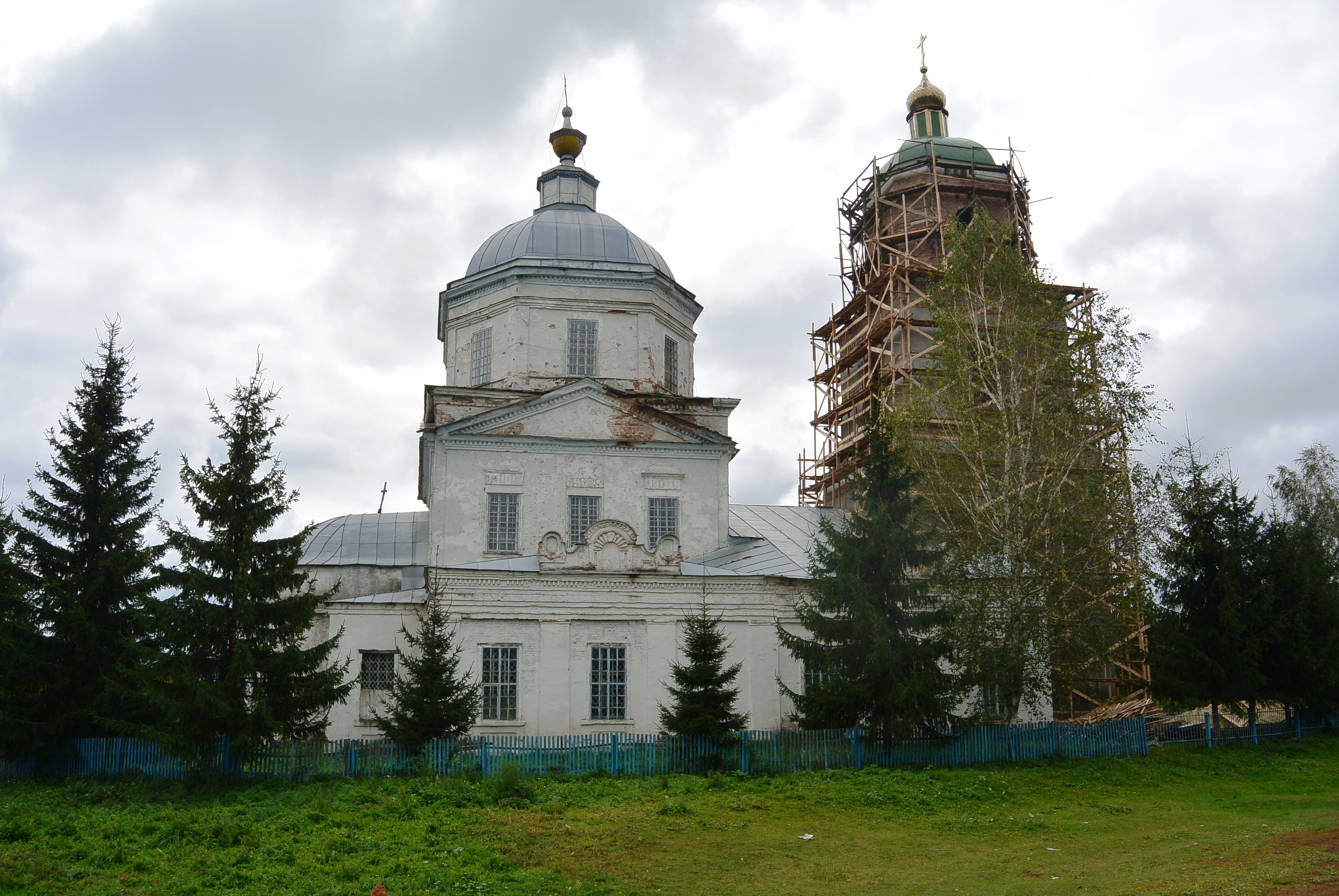
- St. Nicholas Church in Sopych
- Interactive map of Sopych
- Location of Sopych Sopych (Ukraine)
- Coordinates: 51°50′55″N 34°21′51″E
- Country: Ukraine
- Oblast: Sumy Oblast
- Raion: Shostka Raion
- Hromada: Esman settlement hromada
- Elevation: 181 m (594 ft)

Population (2001)
  - Total: 763
- Time zone: UTC+2
  - Summer (DST): UTC+3
- Postal code: 41412
- Area code: +380 5444

Sopych is a village in Ukraine, in Esman, Shostka Raion, Sumy Oblast. Until 2020, the local government body was the Sopych Village Council. As of 2010, the chairman of the village council was Vasyl Timofeevich Ushachev.

== Geography ==
The village of Sopych is located on the right bank of the Kleven River, upstream is the village of Nekislytsia (Sevsky District, Bryansk Oblast, Russia), downstream at a distance of 2.5 km is the village of Potapivka. A drying stream flows through the village. The M02 E101 highway passes nearby. The border with Russia runs along the river.

The village is located 44 km from the city of Hlukhiv on the border of three oblasts: Sumy Oblast, Kursk Oblast and Bryansk Oblast.

== History ==
Sopych has been known since the middle of the 16th century. In the 17th century it belonged to Hetman Ivan Samoylovych. On June 5, 1750, it was transferred to the possession of Hetman Kirill Razumovsky.

In 1917, it has been part of the Ukrainian People's Republic, and since April 1918, it has been part of the Ukrainian State of Hetman Pavlo Skoropadsky. In 1921, the Ukrainian Soviet Socialist Republic gained control of the village, which was resisted by local residents.

The village suffered as a result of the Holodomor carried out by the Soviet Union in 1923–1933 and in 1946–1947, which resulted in at least 206 villagers dying.

On June 12, 2020, in accordance with the Resolution of the Cabinet of Ministers of Ukraine No. 723-r "On the Determination of Administrative Centers and Approval of Territories of Territorial Communities of Sumy Region", it became part of the Esman settlement hromada.

On July 19, 2020, as a result of the administrative-territorial reform and the liquidation of the Hlukhiv Raion, the village became part of the newly formed Shostka Raion.

=== Russo-Ukrainian War ===
On August 1, 2024, Russian forces struck the village with an FPV drone. A community resident was injured. A residential building in the village was also damaged by shelling.

On August 10, 2024, Russians forces shelled the village with mortars, damaging 2 private houses, the Operational Command North reported.

On August 22, 2024, at about noon, another Russian shelling took place. Village residents born in 1950 and 1957 — Volodymyr Onishchenko and Vasyl Oleksienko — were killed. Valentina Oleksienko, the latter’s wife, was wounded. People were in the garden at the time of the shelling.

On August 28, 2024, the team of the rapid response unit of the Sumy regional organization of the Ukrainian Red Cross Society and Red Crescent Movement managed to evacuate 57 people from the village of Sopych. Among them were four people with limited mobility and ten elderly people. Volunteers took four trips to pick up everyone who had made a decision the decision to evacuate. Everyone was taken to the city of Hlukhiv. Then 13 people from among the evacuees were taken to the regional center.

As of March 6, 2026, the Russians occupied the village of Sopych. After that, they kidnapped and took the residents to the Russia. A report with 19 kidnapped Ukrainians was shown on Russian television, these people refused to evacuate and remained in the border village, despite the occupation.

== Population ==
According to the 2001 Ukrainian census, the village's population was 763 people. The main languages of the village were:

- Ukrainian 4.32%
- Russian 95.68%

As of May 2025, the population of Sopych was 22 people

== Notable people ==
The following notable people were born in the village:

- Fedir Avdeev (1883–1950) - A Doctor of Pedagogical Sciences, Professor, Rector of Orel State University (1992–2013).
- Oleksander Hrekov - A Ukrainian military figure, colonel-general of the UNR Army.
- Morgunov Oleksandr Ivanovich - A Ukrainian soldier, a participant in the Russo-Ukrainian war.
