= Neskuchne =

Neskuchne (Ukrainian: Нескучне) is a Ukrainian placename. It may refer to multiple villages:

- Neskuchne, Donetsk Oblast
- Neskuchne, Sumy Oblast
- Neskuchne, Kharkiv Oblast
