= Bilopillia urban hromada =

Urban hromada of Sumy Oblast, Ukraine

Bilopillia urban hromada Білопільська міська громада
- Hromada
- Interactive map of Bilopillia urban hromada
- Location within Sumy Oblast Location within Ukraine
- Coordinates: 51°8′45″N 34°18′42″E
- Country: Ukraine
- Oblast (province): Sumy Oblast
- Raion (district): Sumy Raion

Area
  - Total: 543.2 km^{2} (209.7 sq mi)

Population (2018)
  - Total: 22,966

Bilopillia urban territorial hromada is a territorial hromada in Ukraine, in Sumy Raion, Sumy Oblast. Its administrative center is the city of Bilopillia. The area of the hromada is 543.2 km^{2} and the population is 22,966 (2018).

It was formed on September 13, 2018, by merging the Bilopillia Village Council, Iskryskivshchyna Village Council, Novi Virki Village Council, Obodi Village Council, Pavlivka Village Council and Ryzhivka Village Council of Bilopillia Raion.

On June 12, 2020, in accordance with the Resolution of the Cabinet of Ministers of Ukraine No. 723-r "On the Determination of Administrative Centers and Approval of Territories of Territorial Communities of Sumy Region", it became part of the Bilopillia urban hromada.

On July 19, 2020, as a result of the administrative-territorial reform and liquidation of the Bilopillia Raion, the community became part of the newly formed Sumy Raion.

== Composition ==
In addition to the city of Bilopillia and the village of Peremoha and 52 villages:

- Atynske
- Babakivka
- Bezsalivka
- Bublikove
- Budki
- Chervanivka
- Digtiarne
- Dudchenki
- Golishivs'ke
- Hannivka-Vyrivska
- Hurynivka
- Hyrine
- Ianchenki
- Iskryskivshchyna
- Iosipove
- Kandibine
- Katerynivka
- Kisla Dubina
- Kotenki
- Kovalenki
- Kuianivka
- Makiyivka
- Marianivka
- Meliachykha
- Mirlogi
- Morocha
- Moskalenky
- Neskuchne
- Novi Vyrky
- Novoandriyivka
- Novoivanivka
- Novopetrivka
- Oleksenki
- Pavlivka
- Pavlivske
- Rogizne
- Rudenkove
- Ryzhivka
- Sadove
- Shtanivka
- Shpil
- Smolianykivka
- Sokhany
- Solianyky
- Stari Vyrky
- Stepanivka
- Stukalivka
- Tereschenky
- Vasilivshchina
- Volfine
- Voronivka
