= St. Nicholas Church, Sopych =

Eastern Orthodox church in Dnipro, Ukraine

St. Nicholas Church
- Миколаївська церква
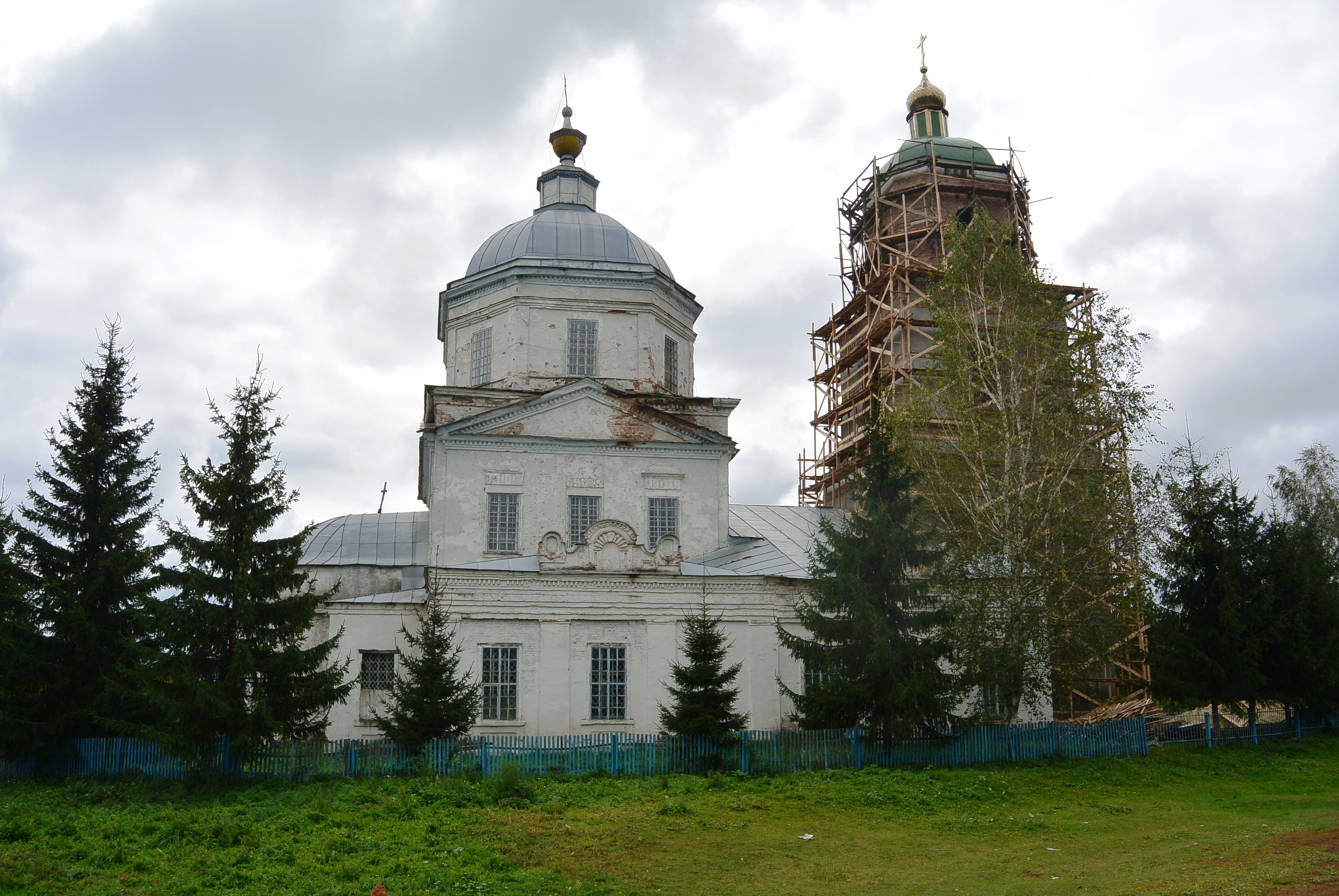
- The church in 2010
- St. Nicholas Church
- 51°50′57″N 34°21′54″E
- Location: Sopych
- Country: Ukraine
- Denomination: Eastern Orthodoxy

History
- Status: Active
- Founded: 1740s
- Dedication: Saint Nicholas

Architecture
- Functional status: Church

Administration
- Archdiocese: Ukrainian Orthodox Church

The St. Nicholas Church, fully know as the St. Nicholas the Wonderworker Church, is a wooden and stone church that has existed alternately in the village of Sopych in Sumy Oblast since the 17th century. The church is dedicated to Saint Nicholas. The stone church is currently under restoration.

== History ==
The village of Sopych was first mentioned as an "empty village" after the Truce of Deulino in 1619. In 1638, this village was mentioned during the demarcation of the border by the Polish–Lithuanian Commonwealth's Border Judges and the Tsardom of Russia's Commission. Naturally, the first church in the village was wooden. It is not known when it was built. In May 1759, the residents of the village of Sopych, at the initiative of the abbot Feodor Smyrnitsky, decided to dismantle it due to its state of disrepair: it was sinking into the ground, the roof was leaking, and the domes were leaning and could fall. At that time, none of the residents of the village remembered when the church of St. Nicholas was built. The parishioners had made an agreement in advance with the craftsmen and purchased materials for the construction of a new church, namely: oak logs for the foundation and walls, boards and nails. Before dismantling the old church, an inventory of all religious utensils and property was also conducted. After dismantling the dilapidated church, the surviving building materials were moved to a dry room to be used for the construction of the bell tower and the cemetery fence. The poor-quality materials were later burned in the oven during the preparation of Prosphora.

During the inventory of the Novgorod-Seversky Viceroyalty in 1779–1781, there was talk of a new wooden church, and nearby a shop for industrial counts 8 and one for the clergy.

The brick church was built in 1796. A 56-meter-high bell tower was later added to the church.

In 1889, the Chernihiv Spiritual Consistory considered the construction of a new wooden church of the Assumption of the Blessed Virgin Mary in the village cemetery to replace the old one, while retaining the old name.

== Description ==
According to the information contained in the document "Пропозиція митрополита Київського та Галицького Арсентія Могилевського від 3 липня 1759 року про ремонт церкви Святителя Миколая с. Сопич" (Proposal of Metropolitan of Kyiv and Galicia Arsentiy Mogilev of July 3, 1759 on the repair of the church of St. Nicholas in the village of Sopych), on October 9, 1742, a measurement of the wooden church was carried out. In particular, the iconostasis of the throne was 6 arshins (4.27 m) in height and 4 (2.84 m) in width. On the plan of the Glukhovsky Uyezd of the Novgorod-Seversky Viceroyalty of 1782, from the funds of the Central State Historical Archives of Ukraine in Kyiv, a conventional image of the church of St. Nicholas in the village of Sopych is presented.

In addition to the St. Nicholas Church, there was a wooden church of the Dormition of the Blessed Virgin Mary in the village cemetery of Sopych.

== Bibliography ==
- Опис Новгород-Сіверського намісництва 1779–1781 рр. / Передм. і ред. П. Федоренка. – К.: Вид-во ВУАН, 1931. – 592 с.
- Державний архів Чернігівської області Ф. 127, оп. 24 б, спр. 39.
