= Smolianykivka =

Village in Sumy Oblast, Ukraine

Smolianykivka Смоляниківка
- Village
- Interactive map of Smolianykivka
- Location of Smolianykivka Smolianykivka (Ukraine)
- Coordinates: 51°2′53″N 34°18′24″E
- Country: Ukraine
- Oblast: Sumy Oblast
- Raion: Sumy Raion
- Hromada: Bilopillia urban hromada
- Elevation: 153 m (502 ft)

Population (2001)
  - Total: 11
- Time zone: UTC+2
  - Summer (DST): UTC+3
- Postal code: 41846
- Area code: +380 5443

Smolianykivka is a village in Ukraine, in the Bilopillia urban hromada of Sumy Oblast, Sumy Raion. Until 2020, the local government body was the Hannivka-Vyrivska Village Council.

== Geography ==
The village of Smolyanykyvka is located at a distance of up to 2 km from the villages of Moskalenky, Dudchenki, Kotenki and Hannivka-Vyrivska.

== History ==
The village suffered as a result of the Holodomor carried out by the Soviet Union in 1923–1933 and in 1946–1947.

On June 12, 2020, in accordance with the Resolution of the Cabinet of Ministers of Ukraine No. 723-r "On the Determination of Administrative Centers and Approval of Territories of Territorial Communities of Sumy Region", it became part of the Bilopillia settlement hromada.

On July 19, 2020, as a result of the administrative-territorial reform and liquidation of the Krasnopillia Raion, the village became part of the newly formed Sumy Raion.

== Population ==
According to the 2001 Ukrainian census, the village's population was 11 people. All of the people in the village spoke Ukrainian.

== Notable people ==
The following were born in the village:

- Mykola Poloz - A Ukrainian composer and poet.
