= Vyr =

Archaeological site in Ukraine

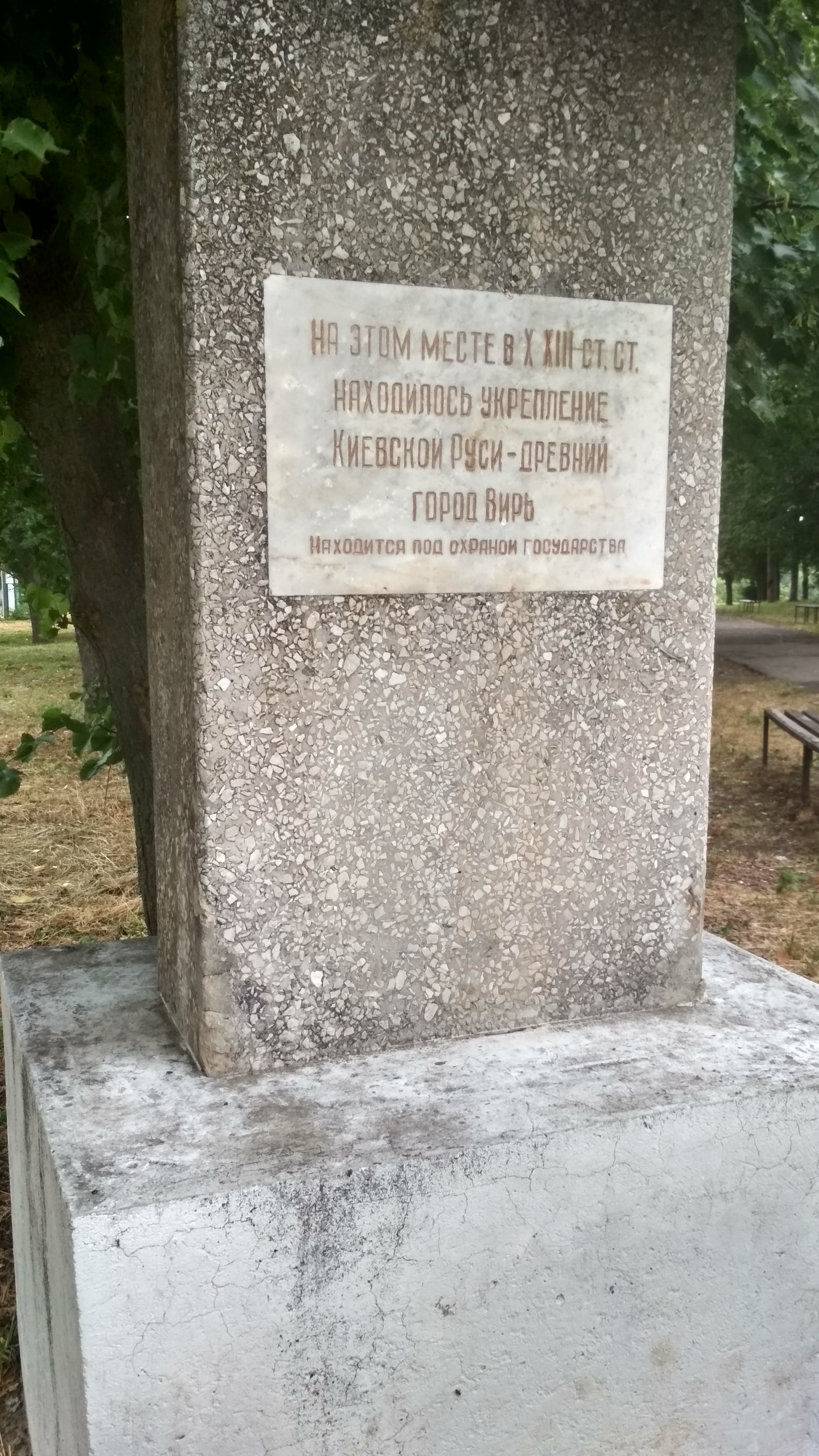
- Plaque on the site of Vyr
- Interactive map of Vyr

History
- Built: 1113
- Abandoned: 1239

Immovable Monument of National Significance of Ukraine
- Official name: Городище літописного міста Вира (Hillfort of the legendary city of Vyr)
- Type: Architecture
- Reference no.: 180003-Н

Vyr is an archaeological site of an ancient city located on the left bank of the Vyr river (a tributary of the Seym river in the Dnipro basin) at the mouth of its tributary, the Kryha river. The modern-day city of Bilopillia is located at the site.

Vyr was first mentioned in the Ipatiev Chronicle in 1113. The city consisted of a citadel (1.5 hectares) on a high (15–18 meters) promontory on the left bank of the Kryha River, and an "outer city" or "fortress" with an adjacent open settlement (7–10 hectares). Vyr was first mentioned in the Ipatiev Chronicle in 1113. The city consisted of a citadel (1.5 hectares) on a high (15–18 meters) promontory on the left bank of the Kryha River, and an "outer city" or "fortress" with an adjacent open settlement (7–10 hectares).

It is mentioned in chronicles in connection with the struggle against the Polovtsians and feudal strife in the southern lands of Rus as the center of the eponymous volost between the headwaters of the Sula and Seym rivers (an area of over 8,000 square kilometers) in the 12th century, which changed hands several times. From 1159 to 1162, it was the capital of the appanage of Izyaslav Davydovych. Later, together with the Kursk Seim, Vyr became part of the Novgorod-Seversk Principality. It played an important role in the defense system of the southeastern borders of Rus, controlling the "steppe corridor" – the passage to the Polovtsian steppe. It was destroyed in 1239 during the Mongol-Tatar invasion.
