= Chernihiv Border Detachment =

105th Chernihiv Border Detachment
- 105 прикордонний загін імені князя Володимира Великого (Ukrainian)
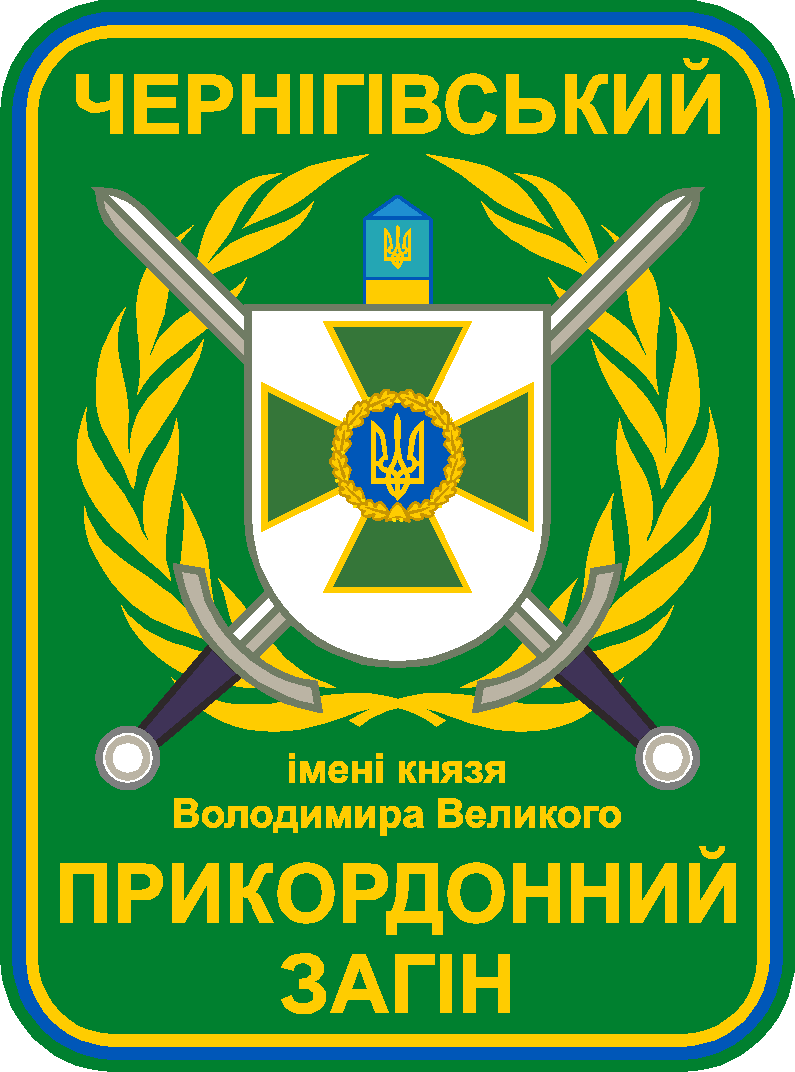
- Detachment Insignia
- Founded: 1992
- Country: Ukraine
- Allegiance: Ministry of Internal Affairs
- Branch: State Border Guard Service of Ukraine
- Type: Brigade
- Role: Border Guard
- Part of: State Border Guard Service of Ukraine
- Garrison/HQ: Chernihiv
- Patron: Vladimir the Great
- Engagements: Russo-Ukrainian war: Russian invasion of Ukraine; Northern Ukraine campaign; Siege of Chernihiv; Northern Ukraine border skirmishes; Eastern Ukraine campaign; Battle of Avdiivka
- Decorations: For Courage and Bravery

Commanders
- Current commander: Colonel Pavlyk Oleksandr Mykolayovych

The Chernihiv Border Detachment "Prince Vladimir the Great" (MUN 2253) is a brigade level detachment of the Central Department of the State Border Service of Ukraine. The detachment guards the Ukraine-Russia border and the Ukraine-Belarus border in three Raions (Novhorod-Siverskyi Raion, Koriukivka Raion and Chernihiv Raion) of Chernihiv Oblast. The total border guarded by the detachment is 459 km, 235 km with Belarus and 234 km with Russia, 206.3km on land and 252.7km on river.

== History ==
=== World War II ===
On 27 January 1942, two freelance companies of the Special Battalion of the Special Department of the NKVD arrived at the disposal of the task force headed by Major Vasyl Alekseev for the establishment of a new regiment, 310 personnel with weapons and equipment arrived and on the same day, they were joined by 54 soldiers of the 20th and 21st border outposts of the 8th border detachment. On 1 February 1942, 25 soldiers of the rifle platoon of the 20th rifle division joined the regiment. On 15 February 1942, it was named the 105th Border regiment of NKVD on the Leningrad Front. In July 1942, the regiment was transferred to the Volkhov Front. On 25 April 1943, the 105th regiment was awarded the Combat Banner on behalf of the Presidium of the Supreme Soviet. On 10 May 1944, the regiment was transferred to the 3rd Baltic Front. On 13 October 1944, the regiment was deployed to take part in the capture of Riga. On 31 October 1944, the 105th Border Regiment was given the honorary name "Ryzhky". On 7 November 1944, it became part of the 10th Rifle Division of NKVD. On 23 March 1945, the regiment became part of the 1st Belorussian Front. On 24 April 1944, as part of the 5th Shock Army of the 1st Belorussian Front, after a 140km March, reached Battle of Berlin and, together with other units of the Red Army, took part in the assault on the Reichstag. Soldiers of the 105th regiment then also guarded the Potsdam Conference. On 11 June 1945, the regiment was awarded the Order of the Red Banner.

=== Cold War ===
Following the conclusion of the Second World War, the regiment continued to operate in East Germany. In August 1958, it was transferred to KGB. From 1945 to 1992, the regiment and its units served in Berlin specifically Biesdorf, Weissensee, Karlshorst and Rummelsburg as well as in Potsdam, Leipzig, Rostock, Schwerin, Sigmaringen and Erfurt.

=== Initial service in Ukraine ===
In 1992, following the Reunification of Germany and the Dissolution of the Soviet union, the regiment was deployed to Drohobych for the protection of Poland-Ukraine border. In October 1992, new border detachments were created along the northeastern borders of Ukraine. In March 1993, the 105th regiment was deployed to Chernihiv, it was expanded and became a detachment. In 1997, a marine division became a part of the detachment. On 16 February 2002, the 105th Chernihiv "Riga Order of the Red Banner and the Red Star" border detachment was awarded the Ukrainian Battle Flag replacing the Soviet banner. In 2009, a group of maritime guard boats was transferred to the Zhytomyr border detachment. On 23 August 2019, on the Day of the State Flag, the detachment was awarded the honorary name "Prince Vladimir the Great".

=== Russo-Ukrainian war ===
Following the Russian invasion of Ukraine in February 2022, it saw heavy combat against Russian forces. It saw combat operations during the siege of Chernihiv. On the morning of 24 February 2022, at the start of the invasion, at the first alarm signals, the detachment retreated its equipment from the border on three armored personnel carriers but lost two vehicles during strikes by Russian forces. Three guardsmen of the detachment (Horytsky Oleksandr Mykhailovych, Chuban Sergey Mykolayovych and Andriy Vasyliovych Khovrenko) were killed on the outskirts of Chernihiv on 26 February 2022. On 28 March 2022, a guardsman of the detachment (Mykhailo Serhiyovych Guk) was killed in Chernihiv. Another guardsman of the detachment (Ilya Kryuchok) was killed in action on the outskirts of Chernihiv on 16 March 2022. On 28 March 2022, four guardsmen of the detachment (Patyutko Stanislav Stanislavovich, Ovdiy Ihor Anatoliyovych, Anton Myahky and Andriy Samusenko) were killed in combat in Chernihiv. On 15 April 2022, the positions of the detachment were struck twice and again on 22 April with 10 grenades. On 20 May 2022, Russians forces fired 8 shots with a 120-mm mortar at the Senkivka checkpoint of the detachment. On 28 March 2023, the detachment shot down a Russian Shahed drone. On 11 May 2022, the detachment's guarded areas were shelled by Russian forces. On 2 February 2023, the heads of Ukrainian and Lithuanian border guards visited the detachment's positions. On 22 April 2023, the Senkivka checkpoint of the detachment was attacked by Russian forces from across the border. On 28 April 2023, the detachment was twice attacked by Russian forces. The detachment also saw combat during the Battle of Avdiivka. On 30 April 2023, the detachment was awarded the honorary award "For Courage and Bravery". On 13 May 2023, the detachment shot down a Russian Geran-2 UAV. On 31 August 2023, the detachment foiled a Russian infiltration attempt into Chernihiv Oblast. On 18 October 2023, in the vicinity of the village of Yelyzavetivka, a guardsman of the detachment (Oleksandr Mykhailovych Bybyk) was killed as a result of mortar shelling. On 31 August 2024, a guardsman of the detachment (Bohdan Luchyshyn Rava-Ruska) was killed in a border skirmish with Russian forces in Mikhalchyna-Sloboda in Novhorod-Siverskyi urban hromada. On 17 February 2023, the detachment shot down a Russian FPV drone. On 19 September 2024, Russian forces attacked Novhorod-Siverska, Semenivska and Snovska, Halyna Shekhovtsova with artillery, drones and mortars resulting in 85 explosions per the detachment. On 26 October 2024, the detachment shot down a Russian Shahed drone. In November 2024, German FM visited the detachment's positions. On 15 November 2024, the detachment stated that the Russian forces attacked three border communities of Chernihiv Oblast with FPV drones and mortars.

== Structure ==
The detachment includes:

- Management and Headquarters
- Border Service Department "Gremyach"
- Border Service Department "Vorobiivka"
- Border Service Department "Leonivka"
- Border Service Department "Semenivka"
- Border Service Department "Huta-Studenetska"
- Border Service Department "Hirsk"
- Border Service Department "Schors"
- Border Service Department "Derevyny"
- Border Service Department "Dobryanka"
- Border Service Department "Zaderiivka"
- Border Service Department "Dniprovske"
- Mobile Border Outpost "Chernihiv"
- Marine Division
- Guardian units

The detachment has 14 checkpoints in its area of responsibility

- 8 Automobile Checkpoints
  - "Gremyach"
  - "Mykolaivka"
  - "Senkivka"
  - "Novi Yarylovichi"
  - "Slavutich"
  - "Derevyn"
  - "Ilmivka"
  - "Dobryanka"
- 5 Railway Checkpoints
  - 3 Passenger Railway Checkpoints
    - "Khorobichy"
    - "Gornostaevka"
    - "Nedanchychi"
  - 2 Freighters Checkpoints
    - "Schors"
    - "Chernihiv"
- 1 River Checkpoint
  - "Kamyanka"

== Commanders ==
- Lieutenant Colonel Alekseev Vasyl Vasyliovych (15 February 1942-16 July 1946)
- Lieutenant Colonel Yevhen Oleksandrovych Hrabovsky (16 July 1946-8 August 1947)
- Colonel Mykhailo Leonidovych Alekseev (08 August 1947-6 February 1954)
- Colonel Secert Kostyantyn Fedorovych (6 February 1954-11 November 1954)
- Colonel Koptev Fedor Hryhorovych (22 December 1954-13 September 1957)
- Colonel Ivanov Oleksandr Fedorovych (13 September 1957-26 January 1960)
- Colonel Pavlo Romanovych Nazarov (26 January 1960-10 December 1964)
- Lieutenant Colonel Viktor Serhiyevich Antonov (10 December 1964-21 May 1970)
- Colonel Orlov Volodymyr Petrovych (21 May 1970-6 December 1974)
- Lieutenant Colonel Yevsikov Eduard Georgiyovych (6 December 1974-1 August 1978)
- Lieutenant Colonel Pakhilo Leonid Lavrentiyovych (1 August 1978-14 October 1980)
- Colonel Fedorenko Ivan Andriyovych (14 October 1980-12 November 1985)
- Lieutenant Colonel Popov Boris Mykolayovych (12 November 1985-23 June 1988)
- Colonel Viktor Serhiyevich Chubin (23 June 1988-30 March 1991)
- Colonel Ihor Vasylyovych Egorov (30 March 1991-16 November 1992)
- Colonel Oleksandr Oleksandrovich Stepanyuk (16 November 1992-19 April 1993)
- Colonel Rakovich Mykola Serhiyovych (27 April 1993-13 May 1994)
- Colonel Popov Valery Anatoliyovych (13 May 1994-10 March 1995)
- Colonel Kostyuk Volodymyr Oleksandrovich (10 Match 1995-13 September 2001)
- Colonel Rudnytsky Volodymyr Oleksandrovich (13 September 2001-28 October 2004)
- Colonel Yury Oleksandrovych Sambor (1 January 2005-01 August 2008)
- Colonel Yehorov Volodymyr Serhiovych (1 August 2008-16 July 2010)
- Colonel Viktor Babiuk (17 July 2010-9 February 2012)
- Colonel Ptitsya Oleksandr Hryhorovych (10 February 2012-10 October 2014)
- Colonel Tymchuk Ihor Fedorovych (11 October 2014-9 December 2015)
- Colonel Dmytro Volodymyrovych Lishchynsky (10 December 2015-28 March 2016)
- Colonel Serhii Albertovych Tyrkalov (29 March 2016-20 November 2019)
- Colonel Blak Oleksandr Volodymyrovych (28 December 2019-22 December 2023)
- Colonel Kigivchak Roman Ivanovich (23 December 2023-26 June 2024)
- Colonel Pavlyk Oleksandr Mykolayovych (27 June 2024-)

== Sources ==
- Чернігівський прикордонний загін Державної прикордонної служби України
