= Stari Vyrky =

Village in Sumy Oblast, Ukraine

Stari Vyrky Старі Вирки
- Village
- Interactive map of Stari Vyrky
- Location of Stari Vyrky Stari Vyrky (Ukraine)
- Coordinates: 51°13′6″N 34°13′2″E
- Country: Ukraine
- Oblast: Sumy Oblast
- Raion: Sumy Raion
- Hromada: Bilopillia urban hromada
- Elevation: 146 m (479 ft)

Population (2001)
  - Total: 202
- Time zone: UTC+2
  - Summer (DST): UTC+3
- Postal code: 41817
- Area code: +380 5443

Stari Vyrky is a village in Bilopillia urban hromada, Sumy Raion, Sumy Oblast, Ukraine. Until 2020, the local government body was the Novi Vyrky Village Council.

== Geography ==
The village of Stari Vyrky is located on the left bank of the Vyr River, upstream at a distance of 1.5 km is the town of Vorozhba, downstream is the village of Novi Vyrky.

== History ==
A Bronze Age and Early Iron Age settlement was discovered in the southeast of the village.

The village suffered as a result of the Holodomor carried out by the Soviet Union in 1923–1933 and in 1946–1947.

On June 12, 2020, in accordance with the Resolution of the Cabinet of Ministers of Ukraine No. 723-r "On the Determination of Administrative Centers and Approval of Territories of Territorial Communities of Sumy Region", it became part of the Bilopillia urban hromada.

On July 19, 2020, as a result of the administrative-territorial reform and liquidation of the Bilopillia Raion, the village became part of the newly formed Sumy Raion.

=== Russo-Ukrainian War ===
On July 16, 2024, Russian troops shelled the village. Two explosions were recorded, probably from a UAV.

On August 27, 2024, the Operational Command North reported shelling of the village. 2 shells were recorded: 4 explosions, probably a 120 mm mortar.

== Demographics ==
According to data from 1862, the state-owned village of Putyvlsky district of Kursk province had a population of 657 people (328 men and 329 women), and there were 60 households.

As of 1880, the former state village of Hlushetska volost had a population of 734 people, 118 households, and 11 windmills.

According to the 2001 Ukrainian census, the village's population was 58 people. The main languages of the village were:

- Russian 56.57%
- Ukrainian 40.91%
- Armenian 2.53%

== Fauna ==
In the Vyr River near the village lives the Russian desman.

== Notable people ==
- Mykhailo Terletsky — Honored Doctor of the Ukrainian SSR, surgeon. Deputy of the Verkhovna Rada of the Ukrainian SSR of the 3rd-4th convocations.
- Titov Nikolaevich — Ukrainian Soviet figure.
