= Hannivka-Vyrivska =

Village in Sumy Oblast, Ukraine

Hannivka-Vyrivska Ганнівка-Вирівська
- Village
- Interactive map of Hannivka-Vyrivska
- Location of Hannivka-Vyrivska Hannivka-Vyrivska (Ukraine)
- Coordinates: 51°1′45″N 34°17′24″E
- Country: Ukraine
- Oblast: Sumy Oblast
- Raion: Sumy Raion
- Hromada: Bilopillia urban hromada
- Elevation: 155 m (509 ft)

Population (2001)
  - Total: 677
- Time zone: UTC+2
  - Summer (DST): UTC+3
- Postal code: 41846
- Area code: +380 5443

Hannivka-Vyrivska is a village in Ukraine, in the Bilopillia urban hromada of Sumy Oblast, Sumy Raion. Until 2020, the local government body was the Hannivka-Vyrivska Village Council.

== Geography ==
The village of Hannivka-Vyrivska is located between the Loknya River, Kuianivka RiverKuyanivka and Vyr River. At a distance of 2 km are the villages of Kotenki and Smolianykivka.

The Loknyanyaka River, a left tributary of the Vyr River, originates in the village.

== History ==
The village was founded in the middle of the 19th century.

The village suffered as a result of the Holodomor carried out by the Soviet Union in 1923–1933 and in 1946–1947.

On June 12, 2020, in accordance with the Resolution of the Cabinet of Ministers of Ukraine No. 723-r "On the Determination of Administrative Centers and Approval of Territories of Territorial Communities of Sumy Region", it became part of the Bilopillia urban hromada.

On July 19, 2020, as a result of the administrative-territorial reform and liquidation of the Bilopillia Raion, the village became part of the newly formed Sumy Raion.

== Demographics ==
As of 1914, the village belonged to the Vyrivskaya Volost of the Sumsky Uyezd of the Kharkov Governorate, which had 1,702 people.

According to the 1989 census of the Ukrainian SSR, the village's population was 626 people, of whom 284 were men and 342 were women.

According to the 2001 Ukrainian census, the village's population was 677 people. The main languages of the village were:

- Ukrainian 97.06%
- Russian 2.65%
- Armenian 0.15%
- Moldovan (Romanian) 0.14%

== Notable people ==
- Oleksandr Pryadka (1991–2022) - Serviceman of the Armed Forces of Ukraine, participated and died in the Russo-Ukrainian War.
- Ivan Hladenko (1915–1991) - Ukrainian veterinarian.
- Mykhailo Borysenko (1909–1970) - Major of the Soviet Army, Hero of the Soviet Union.
