= Kucherivka =

Village in Ukraine

Kucherivka Кучерівка
- Border Town
- Interactive map of Kucherivka
- Location within Ukraine Location within Sumy Oblast
- Coordinates: 51°43′37″N 34°11′55″E
- Country: Ukraine
- Oblast: Sumy
- Raion: Shostka
- Time zone: UTC+3 (EEST)

Kucherivka was a selo at the border with Russia in Sumy Oblast, Ukraine. It was heavily damaged and destroyed during the Russian invasion of Ukraine. It is in the Shostka Raion on the Russia-Ukraine border.
