= Sumy Border Detachment =

5th Sumy Border Detachment
- 5 прикордонний загін (Ukrainian)
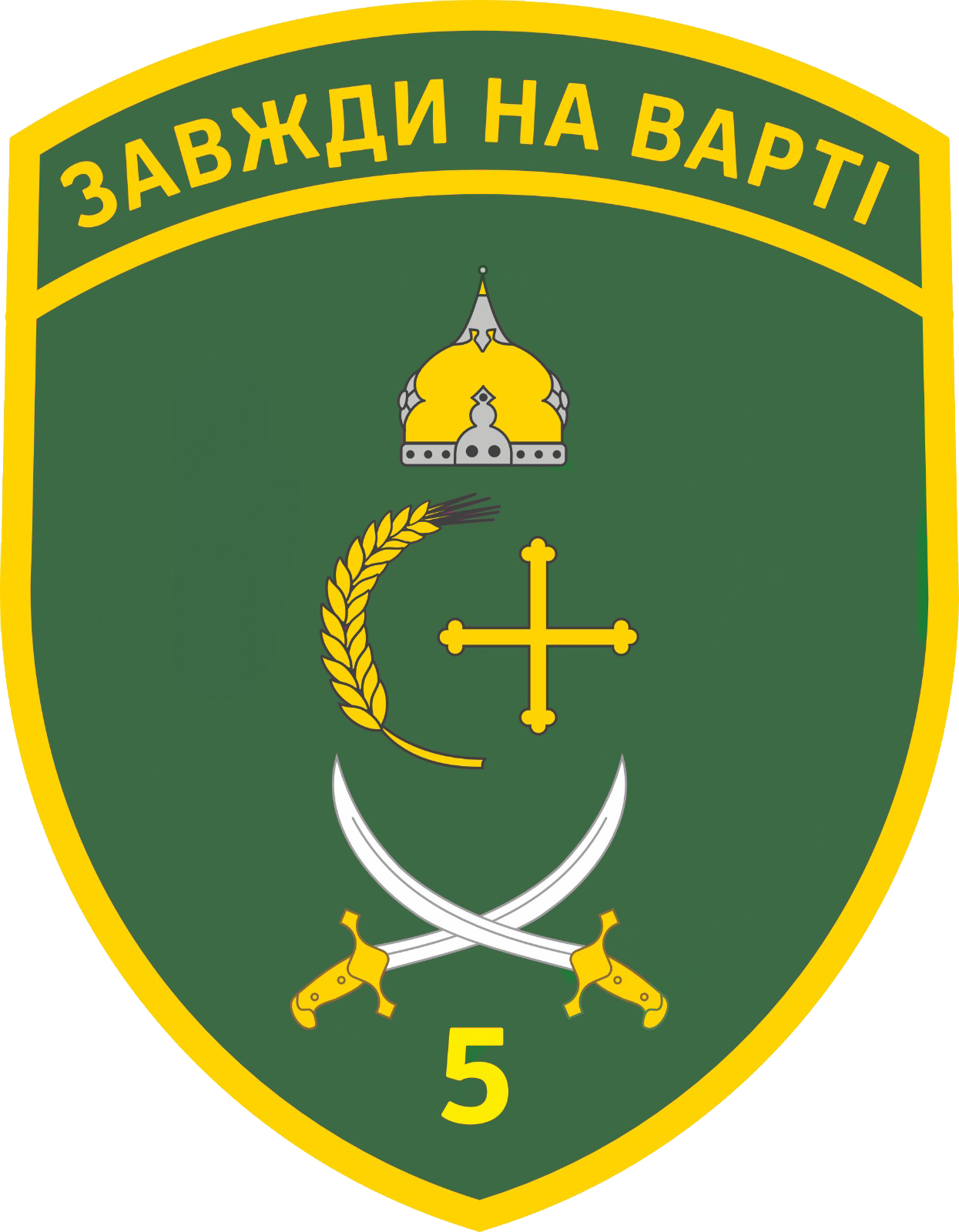
- Detachment Insignia
- Founded: 1992
- Country: Ukraine
- Allegiance: Ministry of Internal Affairs
- Branch: State Border Guard Service of Ukraine
- Type: Brigade
- Role: Border Guard
- Part of: State Border Guard Service of Ukraine
- Garrison/HQ: Sumy
- Engagements: Russo-Ukrainian war; War in Donbass; Russian invasion of Ukraine; Northern Ukraine campaign; Battle of Sumy; Northern Ukraine border skirmishes
- Decorations: For Courage and Bravery

Commanders
- Current commander: Colonel Mykola Stepanovych Romanchuk

The Sumy Border Detachment (MUN 9953) is a brigade level detachment of the Eastern Department of the State Border Service of Ukraine. The detachment guards the Russia-Ukraine border in three Raions (Konotop Raion, Sumy Raion and Okhtyrka Raion) of Sumy Oblast. The detachment guards a border length of 562.5 km, 464.5 km on land and 98 km on river.

== History ==
It was established on 20 October 1992 and armed with GAZ-66, UAZ and LuAZ vehicles and started operations in 1993. In 2000, the Sumy border control unit became the Sumy Border Detachment following the merger of "Krasnopillya" detachment into it. In 2001, 228 illegal migrants were detained by the detachment.

From 2016 to 2018, the detachment saw combat during the war in Donbass. On 3 October 2017 , 2 officers of the Sumy border detachment were monitoring the border. At around 8:00 p.m., the connection with them was lost, and at the same time, a message appeared in the Russian media about the detention of two guardsmen of the Sumy Detachment by the FSB Border Service of Russia. The captured personnel were released on 2 March 2018, as a part of a prisoner exchange. In 2021, the detachment conducted joint training with the National Guard of Ukraine.

A column of Russian military vehicles crossed the international border at the Bachivsk checkpoint, manned by the personnel of the Sumy Detachment around 5:00 on 24 February. On 4 March 2022, a guardsman from the Khutir-Mykhailivskyi detachment was killed in Chernihiv. Another guardsman of the detachment was killed in Chernihiv on 14 March 2022. On 13 March 2022, a former member of the detachment who had since joined the Luhansk border detachment was killed, reportedly at Shchastia. On 11 February 2023, the detachment was awarded the honorary award "For Courage and Bravery". On 17 March 2024, Russian sabotage groups failed to cross the border into Sumy after the detachment intercepted them. In July 2024, the detachment clashed with Russian forces.

== Structure ==
The structure of the detachment is as follows:

- Management and Headquarters
- Border Service Department "Yunakivka"
- Border Service Department "Svesa"
- Border Service Department "Bilopillia"
- Border Service Department "Velika Pysarivka"
- Border Service Department "Krasnopillia"
- Border Service Department "Nova Sloboda"
- Border Service Department "Seredina-Buda"
- Border Service Department "Shalygine"
- Border Service Department "Znob-Novgorodske"
- Border Service Department "Konotop"
- Border Service Department "Sopych"
- Border Service Department "Slavhorod"
- Border Service Department "Zernove"
- Border Service Department "Khutir Mykhailivskyi"
- Mobile Border Outpost "Sumy"
- Guardian units

== Commanders ==
- Colonel Yurii Oleksiiovych Lozynskyi (October 1992-July 1999)
- Lieutenant Colonel Danilov Pavlo Engelsovich (July 1999-January 2002)
- Lieutenant Colonel Ihor Borisovych Tokovy (January 2002-January 2003)
- Lieutenant Colonel Legkodukh Vadym Anatoliyovych (January 2003-July 2005)
- Lieutenant Colonel Ptitsya Oleksandr Hryhorovych (July 2005-November 2007)
- Lieutenant Colonel Polovnikov Viktor Volodymyrovych (November 2007-October 2010)
- Berkut Lieutenant Colonel Volodymyr Yuriyovych (October 2010-November 2014)
- Colonel Dmytro Valentinovych Ilchynskyi (November 2014-June 2015)
- Colonel Yuriy Volodymyrovych Ratnikov (June 2015-November 2015)
- Colonel Valery Mykolayovych Kravchuk (December 2015 – 2020)
- Colonel Mykola Stepanovych Romanchuk (2020-)
