= Neskuchne, Sumy Oblast =

Neskuchne Нескучне
- Village
- Location within Sumy Oblast Location within Ukraine
- Coordinates: 51°15′08″N 34°25′40″E
- Country: Ukraine
- Oblast: Sumy Oblast
- Raion: Sumy Raion
- Hromada: Bilopillia urban hromada
- Elevation: 182 m (597 ft)

Population (2001)
  - Total: 16

Neskuchne (Ukrainian: Нескучне) is a selo of Sumy Raion in Sumy Oblast (province) of northeastern Ukraine. It belongs to Bilopillia urban hromada, one of the hromadas of Ukraine.

Until 18 July 2020, Neskuchne belonged to Bilopillia Raion. The raion was abolished in July 2020 as part of the administrative reform of Ukraine, which reduced the number of raions of Sumy Oblast to five. The area of Bilopillia Raion was merged into Sumy Raion.
