= Ryzhivka =

Village in Sumy Oblast

Ryzhivka Рижівка
- Village
- Interactive map of Ryzhivka
- Location of Ryzhivka within Ukraine Ryzhivka (Ukraine)
- Coordinates: 51.252472°N 34.25235°E
- Country: Ukraine
- Oblast: Sumy Oblast
- Raion: Sumy Raion
- Hromada: Bilopillia urban hromada
- Founded: 1719
- Elevation: 139 m (456 ft)

Population (2024)
  - Total: 7
- Time zone: UTC+2 (EET)
  - Summer (DST): UTC+3 (EEST)
- Postal code: 41820
- Area code: +380 5443
- KOATUU code: 5920687401
- KATOTTH code: UA59080030390050950

Ryzhivka (Ukrainian: Рижівка; Russian: Рыжевка, romanized: Ryzhevka) is a village in Sumy Raion (district) in Sumy Oblast of northeastern Ukraine, on the left bank of the Seim river, at some hundred meters of the Russia–Ukraine border. It belongs to Bilopillia urban hromada, one of the hromadas of Ukraine.

== History ==
The first written mention of the settlement dates back to 1719.

The village suffered as a result of the Holodomor carried out by the Soviet Union in 1923–1933 and in 1946–1947.

=== Russian Invasion of 2022 ===
During the Russian invasion of Ukraine, the village was reportedly captured on 9 June 2024, by Kadyrovites. However, later Ukrainian president Volodymyr Zelenskyy and Yuri Zarko, head of the Bilopillia hromada, denied that Russian troops had captured Ryzhivka. On 13 June 2024, Ukraine's State Border Guard Service spokesperson Andriy Demchenko claimed in a TV interview that Russian allegations about Ryzhivka are a part of a psychological operation aimed at misleading and demoralizing people in Ukraine. He also said that "Russian activities in Sumy front are not as intense as in Kharkiv Oblast". The Ukrainian military has yet to comment on the situation in Ryzhivka. As of 12 June, ISW has not observed visual evidence confirming Russian activity or gains in Ryzhivka since 10 June and assesses that Russian forces failed to establish an enduring presence in the settlement.

== Demographics ==
As of the 2001 Ukrainian census, the settlement had 854 inhabitants. Their native languages were 82.38% Ukrainian and 17.27% Russian.
