= Shalyhyne =

Rural locality in Sumy Oblast, Ukraine

Shalyhyne Шалигине
- Rural settlement
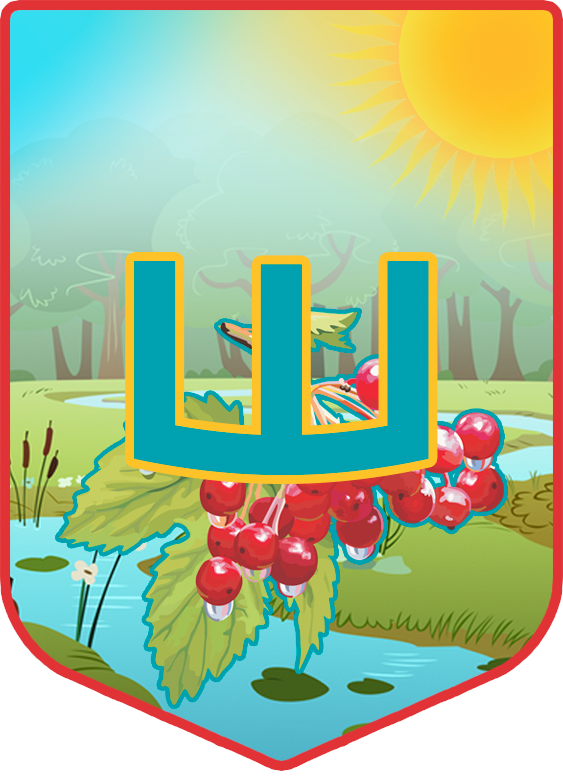

- Location in Sumy Oblast Location in Ukraine
- Country: Ukraine
- Oblast: Sumy Oblast
- Raion: Shostka Raion
- Hromada: Shalyhyne settlement hromada

Population (2022)
  - Total: 2,226
- Time zone: UTC+2 (EET)
  - Summer (DST): UTC+3 (EEST)

Shalyhyne (Ukrainian: Шалигине; Russian: Шалыгино) is a rural settlement in Shostka Raion, Sumy Oblast, Ukraine. It is located on the banks of the Lapuha, a left tributary of the Kleven, in the drainage basin of the Dnieper. Shalyhyne hosts the administration of Shalyhyne settlement hromada, one of the hromadas of Ukraine. Population: 2,226 (2022 estimate).

== History ==
Until 18 July 2020, Shalyhyne belonged to Hlukhiv Raion. The raion was abolished in July 2020 as part of the administrative reform of Ukraine, which reduced the number of raions of Sumy Oblast to five. The area of Hlukhiv Raion was merged into Shostka Raion.

Until 26 January 2024, Shalyhyne was designated urban-type settlement. On this day, a new law entered into force which abolished this status, and Shalyhyne became a rural settlement.

== Economy ==
=== Transportation ===
The settlement has access, via Hlukhiv, to Highway M02 which connects it with Kyiv and Chernihiv, and to the north, across the Russian border, with Oryol and Moscow.

The closest railway station is in Hlukhiv, approximately 10 kilometres (6.2 mi) northwest. This is a terminal station on a side line which branches off the main railway line connecting Moscow and Kyiv via Khutir Mykhailivskyi in Druzhba. As of 2021, there was no passenger traffic.
