= Bezsalivka =

Village in Sumy Raion, Sumy Oblast, Ukraine

Bezsalivka Безсалівка
- Village
- Interactive map of Bezsalivka
- Location of Bezsalivka in Sumy Oblast Bezsalivka (Ukraine)
- Coordinates: 51°15′51″N 34°23′37″E
- Country: Ukraine
- Oblast: Sumy Oblast
- Raion: Sumy Raion
- Hromada: Bilopillia urban hromada
- Elevation: 154 m (505 ft)

Population (2001 census)
  - Total: 90
- Time zone: UTC+2 (EET)
  - Summer (DST): UTC+3 (EEST)
- Postal code: 41821
- Area code: +380 5443
- KATOTTH: UA59080030040094278

Bezsalivka is a village in Sumy Raion, Sumy Oblast, Ukraine. The village is located near the border with Russia.

== History ==
=== Russian invasion of Ukraine ===
On July 7, 2025, the Russian defense ministry claimed that its forces had crossed into the Ukrainian border near Tyotkino and took control of Bezsaliivka.

The Ukrainian military claimed to have retaken the village following an operation that killed 18 Russian soldiers, but a Russian milblogger reportedly affiliated with the Russian Northern Group of Forces refuted the claim.

== Demographics ==
As of the 2001 Ukrainian census, the settlement had 90 inhabitants, whose native languages were 79.62% Ukrainian and 23.08% Russian.
