= Esman =

Rural locality in Sumy Oblast, Ukraine

Esman Есмань
- Rural settlement
- Coat of arms

- Location in Sumy Oblast Location in Ukraine
- Country: Ukraine
- Oblast: Sumy Oblast
- Raion: Shostka Raion
- Hromada: Esman settlement hromada

Population (2022)
  - Total: 1,293
  - Estimate (2025): 380
- Time zone: UTC+2 (EET)
  - Summer (DST): UTC+3 (EEST)

Esman (Ukrainian: Есмань; Russian: Эсмань) is a rural settlement in Shostka Raion, Sumy Oblast, Ukraine. It is located on the left bank of the Esman river, a right tributary of the Kleven, in the drainage basin of the Dnieper. Esman hosts the administration of Esman settlement hromada, one of the hromadas of Ukraine. Population: 1,293 (2022 estimate).

== History ==
The settlement was called Chervone (lit. 'red') until 2016. On 19 May 2016, Verkhovna Rada adopted decision to rename Chervone to Esman according to the law prohibiting names of Communist origin.

Until 18 July 2020, Esman belonged to Hlukhiv Raion. The raion was abolished in July 2020 as part of the administrative reform of Ukraine, which reduced the number of raions of Sumy Oblast to five. The area of Hlukhiv Raion was merged into Shostka Raion.

Until 26 January 2024, Esman was designated urban-type settlement. On this day, a new law entered into force which abolished this status, and Esman became a rural settlement.

== Economy ==
=== Transportation ===
The settlement has access to Highway M02 which connects it with Kyiv and Chernihiv, and to the north, across the Russian border, with Oryol and Moscow.

Esman railway station is located approximately 5 kilometres (3.1 mi) north of the settlement. It is a terminal station of a line from Khutir-Mykhailivskii, and there is no passenger traffic. Until the 1990s, it was a through station on a railroad connecting Orsha and Donetsk, but then the line south of Esman was demolished, since a short section of it was crossing Russia. The closest railway station with passenger traffic is Khutir-Mykhailivskii.
