= Kleven (river) =

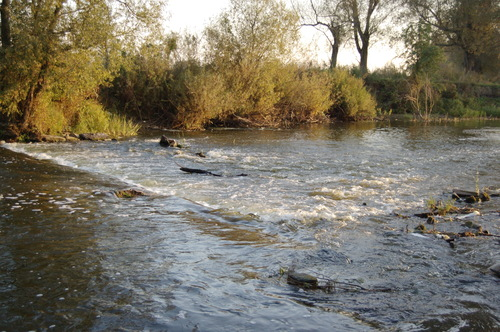
- Native name: Клевень (Ukrainian)

Location
- Country: Russia, Ukraine
- Region: Bryansk Oblast, Kursk Oblast, Sumy Oblast

Physical characteristics
- Source
  - location: near Sopych
  - coordinates: 51°54′4″N 34°19′19″E
- Mouth: Seym
  - coordinates: 51°24′3″N 33°35′7″E
- Length: 113 km (70 mi)
- Basin size: 2,660 km^{2} (1,030 sq mi)

Basin features
- Progression: Dnieper→ Dnieper–Bug estuary→ Black Sea

Kleven (Ukrainian: Клевень) is a 113 km (70 mi) long right tributary of the Seym in Russia and Ukraine. It drains a catchment area of 2660 km^{2} and has a gradient of 0.36 m/km.

== Course ==
Kleven rises in the south-west of the Central Russian Upland in the south of the Russian Bryansk Oblast near the M3/E101 trunk road and initially flows south. After a few kilometers, it comes across the Ukrainian village of Sopych. From there it forms the border between the Ukrainian Sumy Oblast and the Russian Kursk Oblast over a longer stretch, changing its direction of flow mainly to the southwest, until it finally flows into the Seym at the southern edge of the village of Kamin in Sumy Oblast.
