= Bilopillia Raion =

Former subdivision of Sumy Oblast, Ukraine

Bilopillia Raion Білопільський район
- Raion
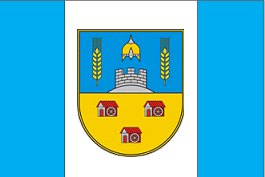
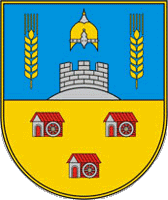
- Flag Coat of arms

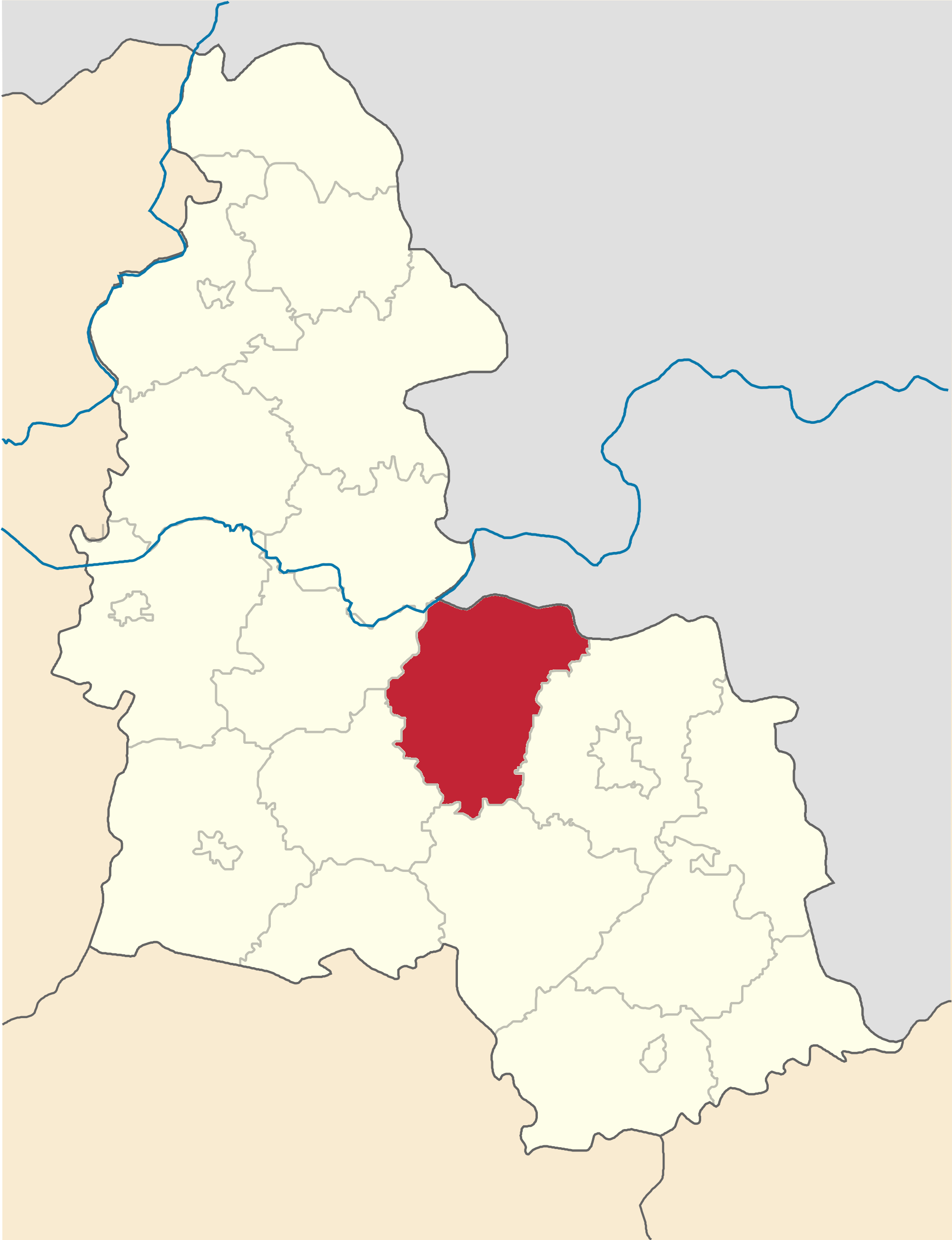
- Raion location in Sumy Oblast
- Coordinates: 51°3′26.2686″N 34°19′6.8916″E
- Country: Ukraine
- Oblast: Sumy Oblast
- Disestablished: 18 July 2020
- Admin. center: Bilopillia

Area
  - Total: 1,500 km^{2} (580 sq mi)

Population (2020)
  - Total: 48,264
  - Density: 32/km^{2} (83/sq mi)
- Time zone: UTC+2 (EET)
  - Summer (DST): UTC+3 (EEST)
- Website: blp.sm.gov.ua/index.php/uk/

Bilopillia Raion (Ukrainian: Білопільський район) was a raion in Sumy Oblast in Central Ukraine. The administrative center of the raion was the town of Bilopillia. The raion was abolished on 18 July 2020 as part of the administrative reform of Ukraine, which reduced the number of raions of Sumy Oblast to five. The last estimate of the raion population was 48,264 (2020 est.).
