= Bilopillia =

City in Sumy Oblast, Ukraine

Bilopillia Білопілля
- City
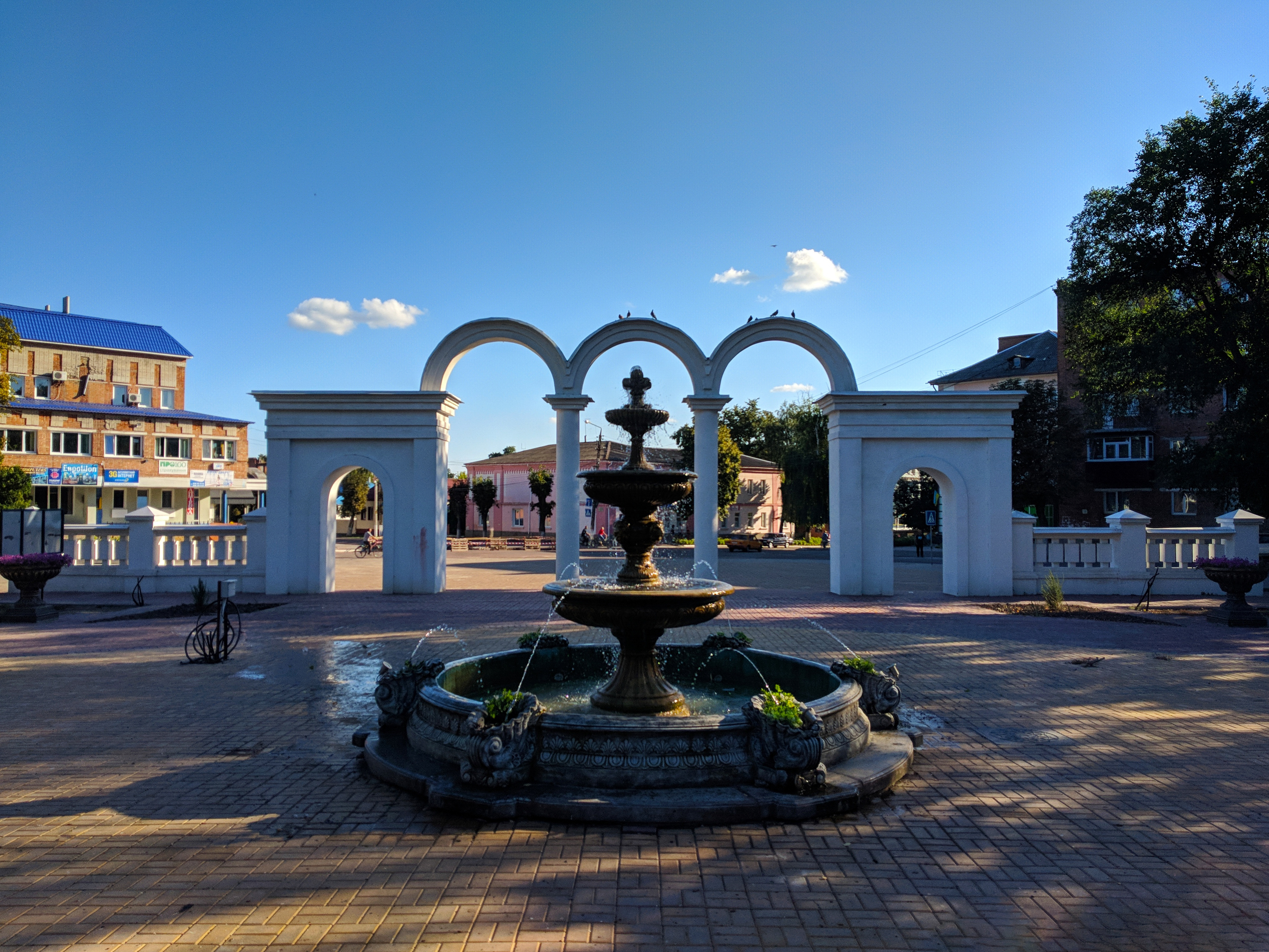
- Central square

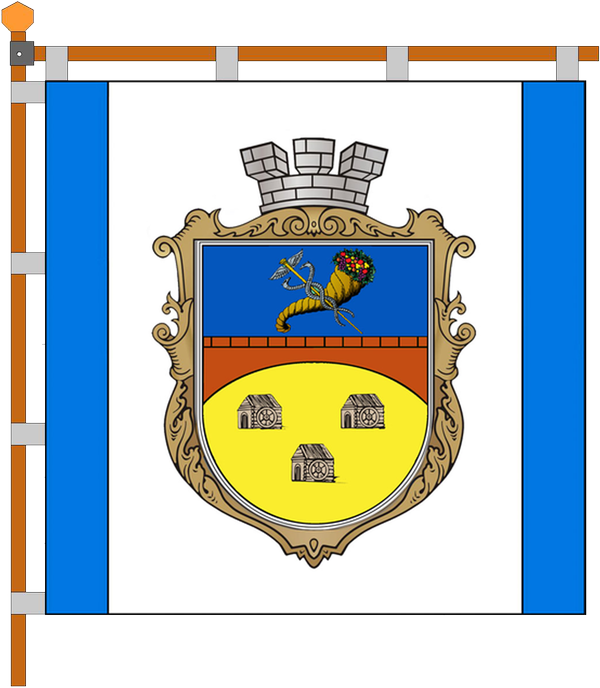
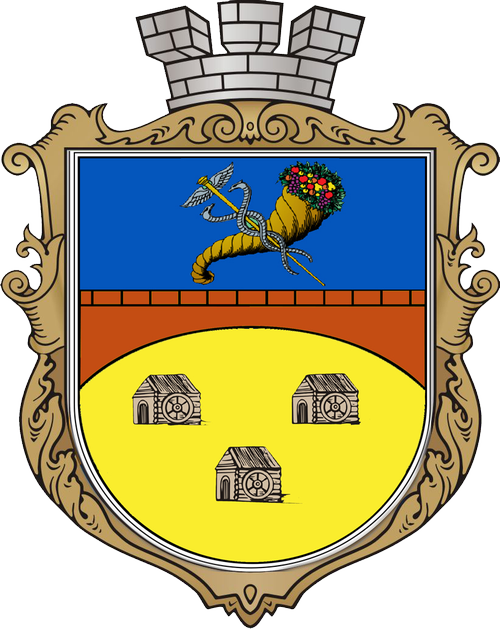
- Flag Coat of arms
- Interactive map of Bilopillia
- Location of Bilopillia Bilopillia (Ukraine)
- Coordinates: 51°08′45″N 34°18′42″E
- Country: Ukraine
- Oblast: Sumy Oblast
- Raion: Sumy Raion
- Hromada: Bilopillia urban hromada
- Founded: 1672

Government
  - Mayor: Zarko Yurii Vasilyovych
- Elevation: 159 m (522 ft)

Population (2022)
  - Total: 15,600
- Postal code: 41800—810
- Area code: +38 (05443)
- KATOTTH: UA59080030010079123
- Website: http://bilopillya-meria.gov.ua/

Bilopillia (Ukrainian: Білопілля [ˌbiɫoˈpilːɐ]) is a city in Sumy Raion of Sumy Oblast of northeastern Ukraine. It was the administrative center of Bilopillia Raion until it was abolished on 18 July 2020. It is located close to Kursk Oblast of Russia. Population: 15,600 (2022 estimate). The city's ancient name is Vyr.

== Geography ==
Bilopillia is located on the Central Upland upon the river Vyr, a tributary of Seym.

Bilopillia railway station is situated in the south part of the city. Roads T1904, T1906, T1908, and highway P45 are present in the city.

== History ==
=== Ancient and medieval period ===
The territory of modern Bilopillia was settled as early as the 2nd–6th centuries, as evidenced by the discovered settlement of the Chernyakhiv culture. During the time of Kievan Rus, the fortified city of Vyr emerged, which was an outpost in the fight against nomads. Vyr is mentioned for the first time in the "Povchannya" of Volodymyr Monomakh in 1096, but the events depicted there relate to the year 1113. In 1239, the city was devastated and burned by the Mongol-Tatars. In the mid-16th century, the posts of the Moscow military guard appeared in this area. One of them was established on the Vyr hillfort. It existed until 1571.

=== Cossack administration ===
In 1672, a new settlement emerged on the site of the ancient Vyr, which had 1352 inhabitants. It was established by settlers from Right-bank Ukraine. The settlement was first mentioned as Kryha, after the local river, in the Chronicle of Samovydets in 1687. The second name – Bilopillia – was given by settlers from the town of the same name.

Bilopillia was an important town in the Sumy Cossack regiment. It consisted of a town with 9 towers and a fort with 13 towers. In 1678 there were 53 Russian service people and 1,202 Cossacks. In 1681, the three villages of Krygu (in office), Vorozhba (2 kilometers from the city), and Pavlivka (5 km from the city) were assigned to Bilopillia.

=== Russian and Soviet rule ===
After the dissolution of Sloboda Ukraine in 1765, Bilopillia became a settlement (since 1791 – a town) in Sumskoy Uyezd in the Kharkov Governorate of the Russian Empire. During the 19th century it was a centre of grain trade, hosting numerous fairs.

In 1932 the town's population reached 12,000. In 1933 Bilopillia Machine-Building Plant was built here.

The settlement suffered as a result of the genocide of the Ukrainian people, conducted by the Government of the USSR in 1932–1933 and 1946–1947. At least 2,000 people died during the Soviet-organized Holodomor of 1932–1933. During World War II, town was occupied by the German Army from 8 October 1941 to 3 September 1943.

After the war Bilopillia served as a centre of machine building, sugar industry and alcohol production.

=== Russo-Ukrainian war ===
The city has been shelled during the Russo-Ukrainian war. On April 26, 2024, Russian artillery killed two civilian women aged 77 and 69 and injured three more, according to Ukrainian sources.

== Demographics ==
=== Population ===
In January 1989 the population was 19,746 people.

In January 2013 the population was 16,731 people.

=== Ethnicity ===
Distribution of the population by ethnicity according to the 2001 census:

Ethnic groups in Bilopillia
	percent
Ukrainians	92.60%
Russians	5.81%
Gypsies	0.81%
Belarusians	0.30%
Armenians	0.12%
Azerbaijanis	0.12%

=== Native languages ===
Distribution of the population by their first language according to the 2001 census:

Native languages in Bilopillia
	percent
Ukrainian	93.3%
Russian	5.6%
Romani	0.7%
Armenian	0.1%
Belarusian	0.1%
others	0.1%

== Gallery ==
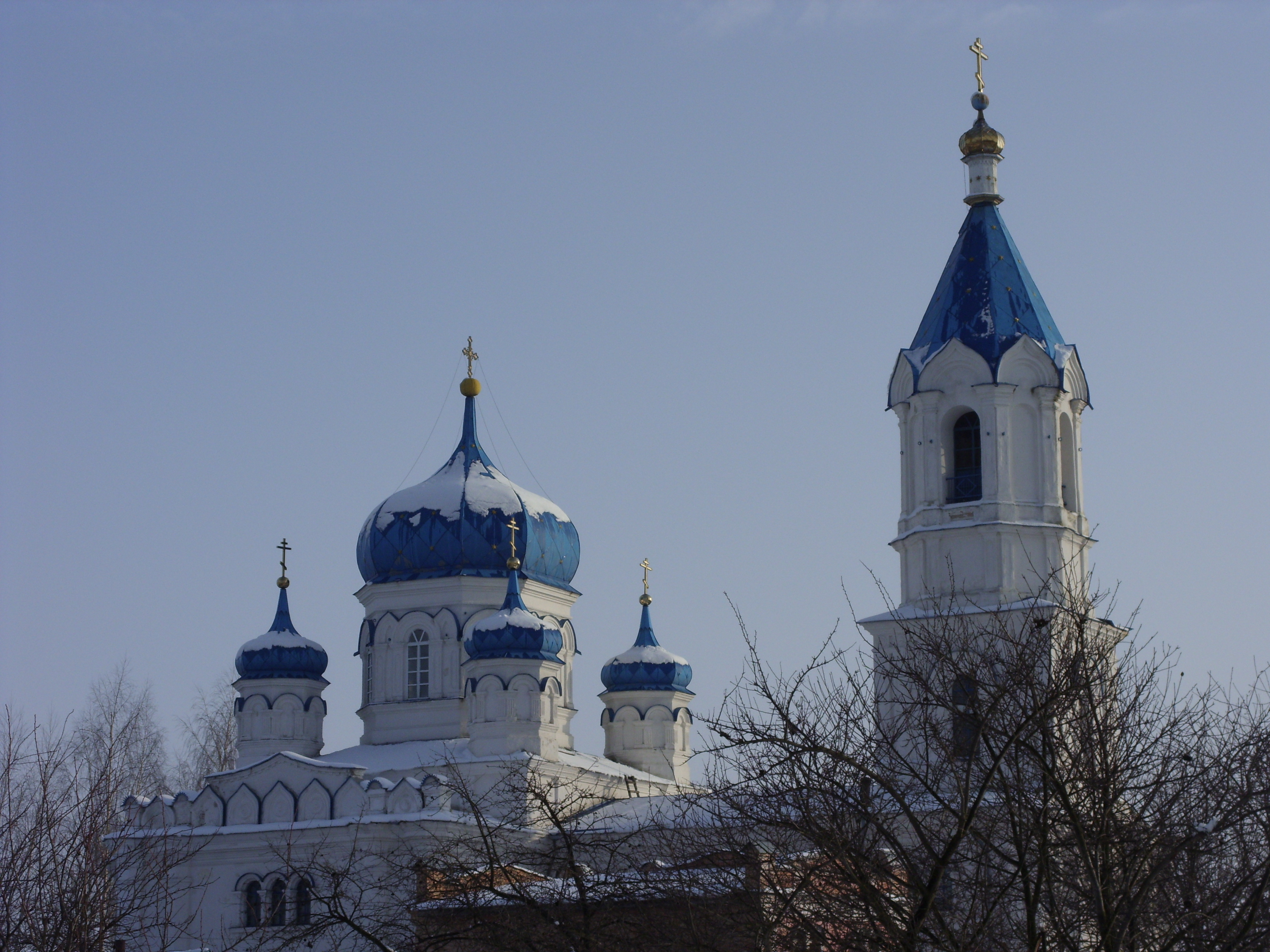
Church of St. Peter and St. Paul

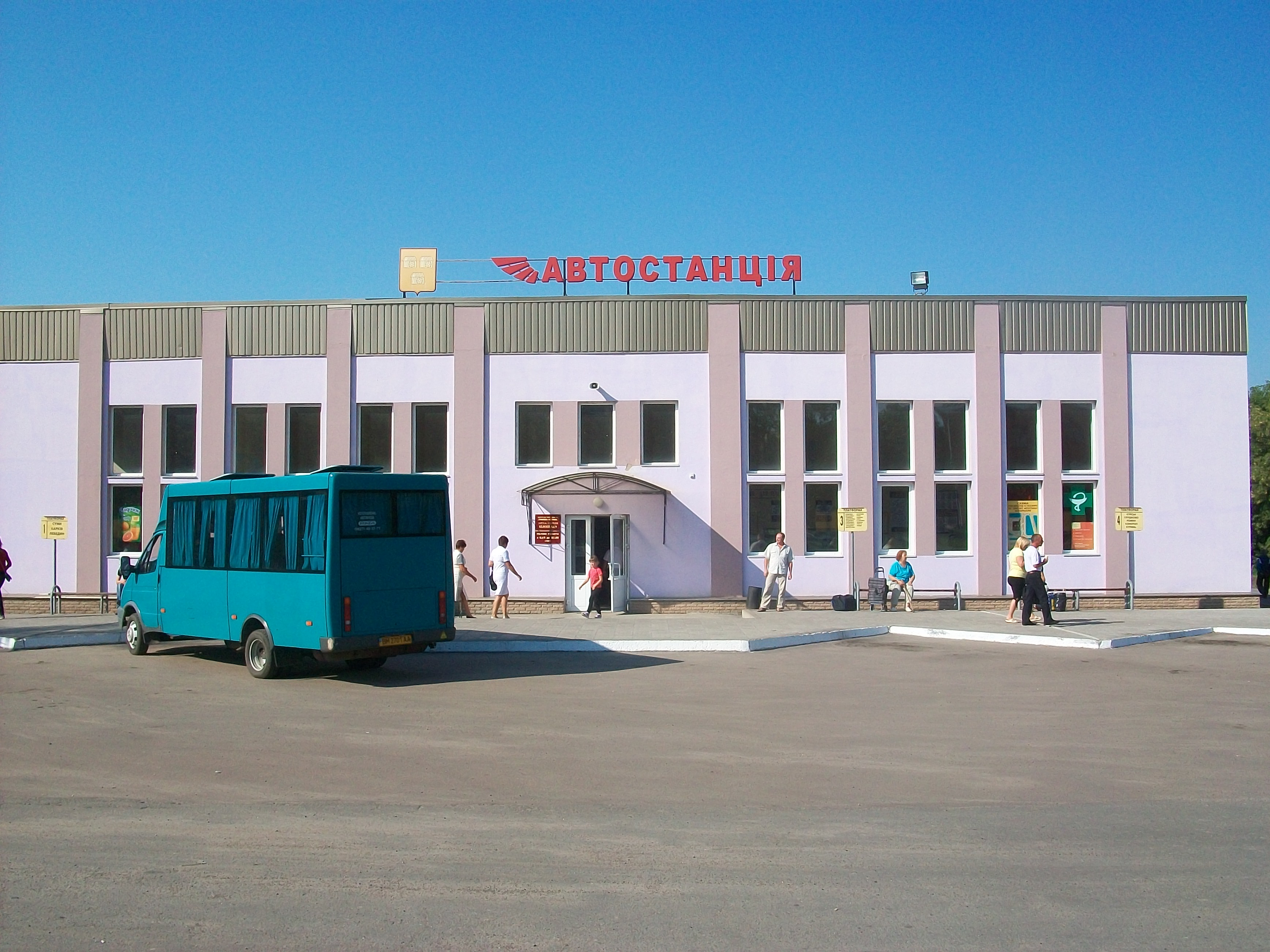
Bus station

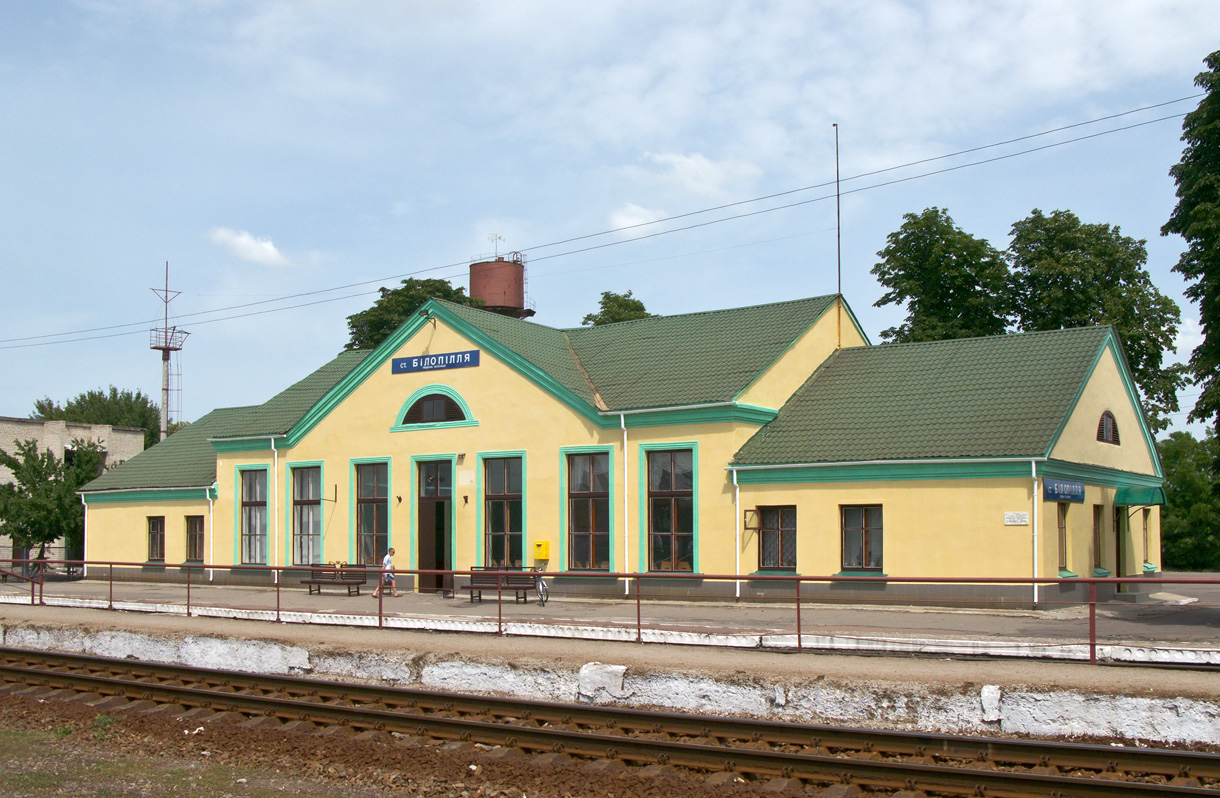
Bilopillia railway station

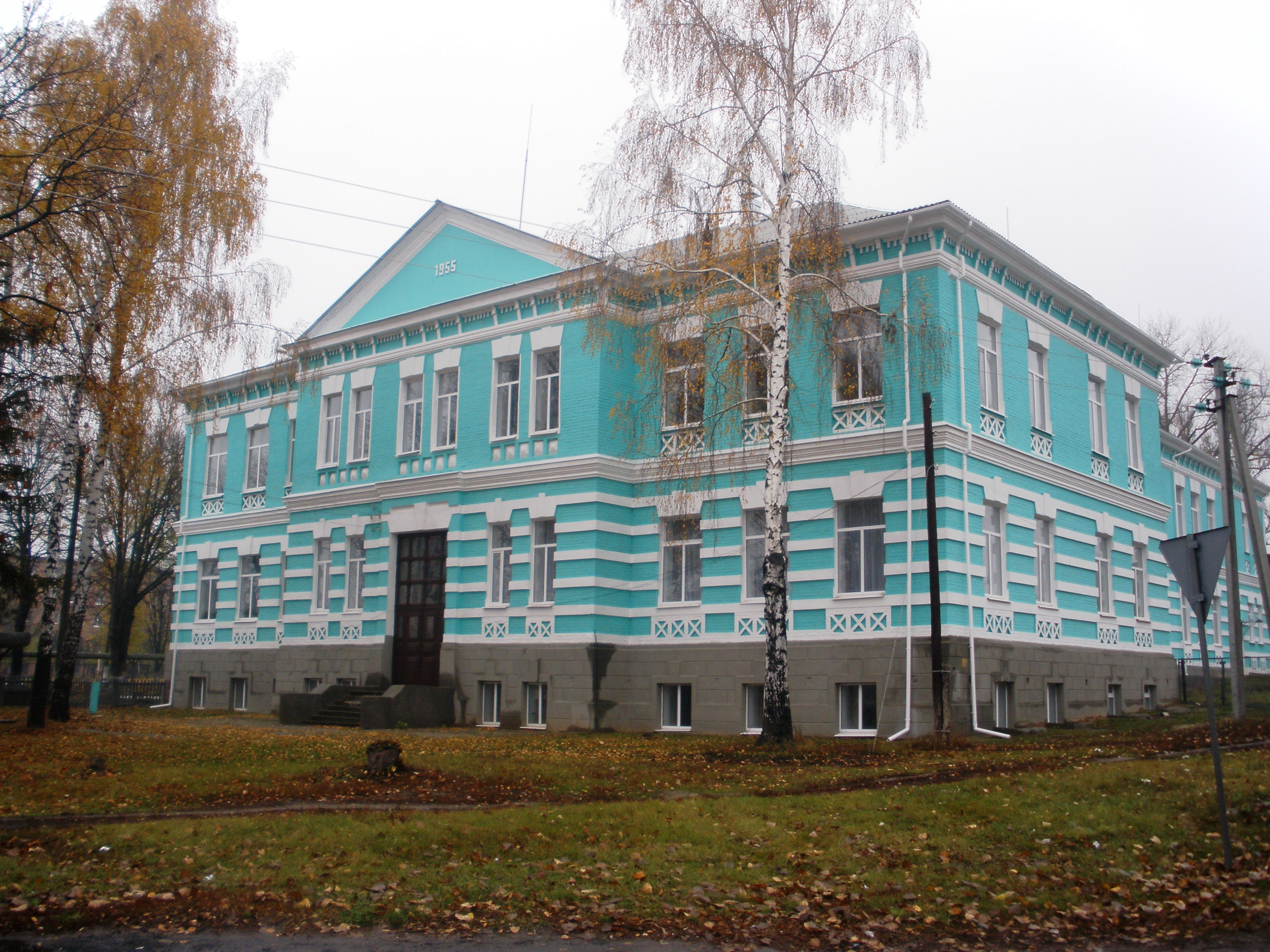
School
