= Sakhnenko =

Sakhnenko (Ukrainian: Сахненко) is a Ukrainian surname. Notable people with the surname include:

- Daniel Sakhnenko (1875–1930), Ukrainian filmmaker and director
- Vladimir Sakhnenko (1930–2008), Ukrainian-Russian painter
