= Vladimir Sakhnenko =

Russian painter

- Born: 10 January 1930; Sumy region, Ukrainian SSR
- Died: 31 July 2008 (aged 78); Tula, Russia
- Known for: Ceramics, painting, drawing

Vladimir Sakhnenko (Russian: Влади́мир Сахне́нко; 10 January 1930 in the Sumy region of Ukraine – 31 July 2008 in Tula) was a painter and ceramist, and a member of the Union of Artists of the USSR since 1967. He is the father of artist Ivan Sakhnenko.

Sakhnenko finished the art school in Voroshilovograd in 1951 and then studied at the Surikov Academic Institute in Moscow, where he met Ilya Kabakov and his future wife – sculptor Zoya Riabchenko. He took part in art exhibitions since 1957. He lived and worked in Tula.

== Ceramics ==
Vladimir Sakhnenko created monumental objects, exterior ceramics and pottery houseware. The utility and decorativeness of his works served to conceal experiments with design and form, seditious for the Soviet period, which he continued in painting.

Many of his works still adorn cultural centres, Tula Drama Theatre, Intourist hotel in Yalta and the government dacha in Foros. State Museum of Culture History of Uzbekistan in Samarkand and World Trade Centre in Moscow are also the holders of Vladimir Sakhnenko's ceramics.

He worked daily in his workroom at Kislotoupor Shchyokino factory making crocks, vases, amphorae, flowerpots, multiple ceramic constructions, and ceramic sculptures of various creatures, almost until the end of his life.

He used chamotte, mostly with glaze. In the late 1970s he discovered a temperature-resistant composition of blue-green glaze that could survive extreme weather conditions, including frost. Sakhnenko's glazed ceramics have been held out of doors in Samarkand and Crimea for almost 40 years.

== Painting ==
In the 1970s the artist created 13 large black and white canvases (held in Erarta Museum). In the early 1980s, Vladimir Sakhnenko turned to making bright paintings: portraits, still lives and works that depict biblical scenes. His personal style (both in painting and pottery) features easy switch from figurativeness to abstraction and ornamentality.

== Art collections ==
- Erarta Museum of Contemporary Art, Saint Petersburg
- Art Season Gallery and Art Caravan Gallery, Moscow
- State Museum of Culture History of Uzbekistan, Samarkand
- Tula Museum of Fine Arts

== Recent exhibitions ==
- 1999 — On the Staraya Basmannaya Street Gallery, Moscow, featuring his son Ivan Sakhnenko
- 2005 — Autumn Marathon, Central House of Artists, Moscow, featuring Ivan Sakhnenko, Avetik and others
- 2006 — Revelation of Colour, Central House of Artists, Moscow, solo exhibition, Art Caravan Gallery
- 2007 — Abstract Art. The Early 21st Century, Central House of Artists, Moscow

== Selected works ==
=== Ceramics ===
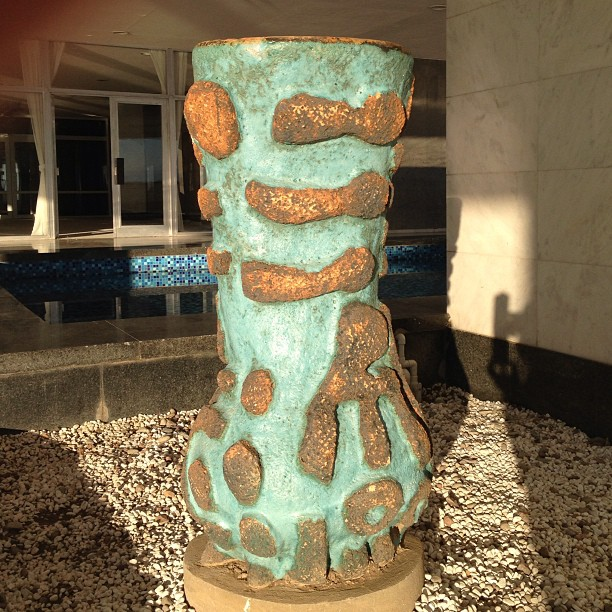
Big vase on the roof of Yalta Hotel Complex

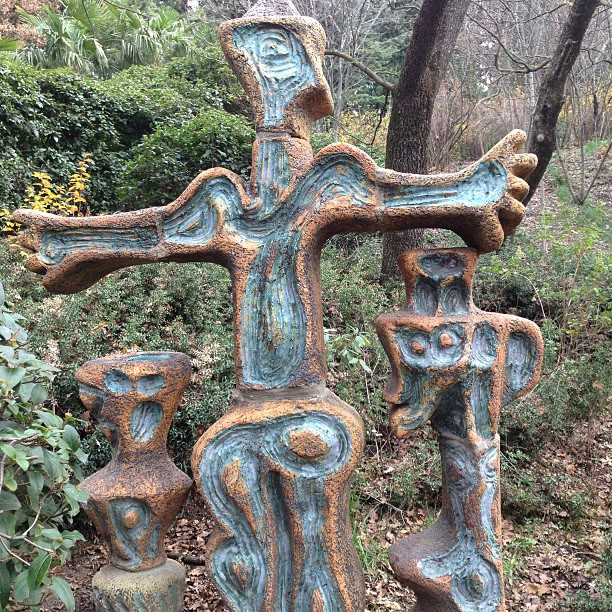
Figures in the garden of Yalta Hotel Complex

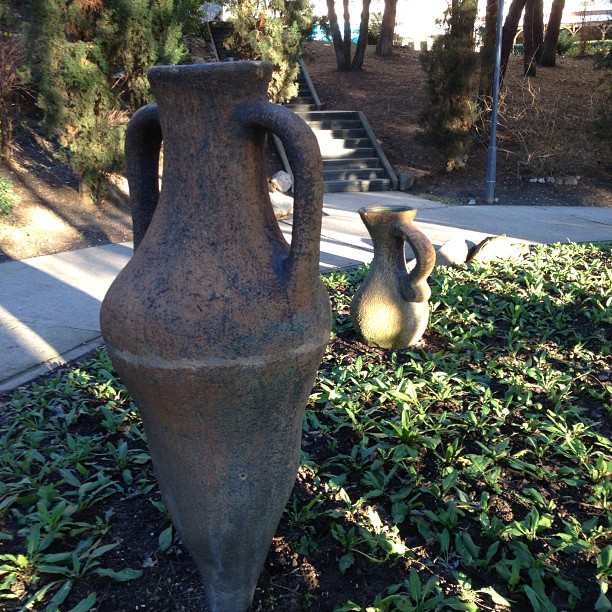
Two amphoras in the garden of Yalta Hotel Complex

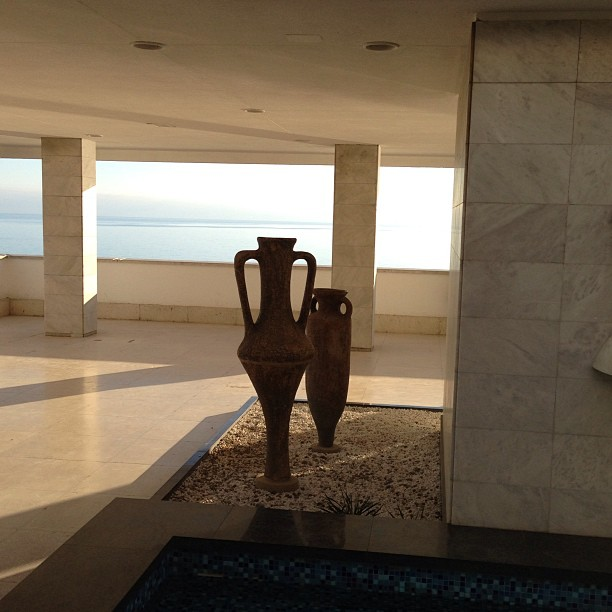
Two amphoras on the roof of Yalta Hotel Complex

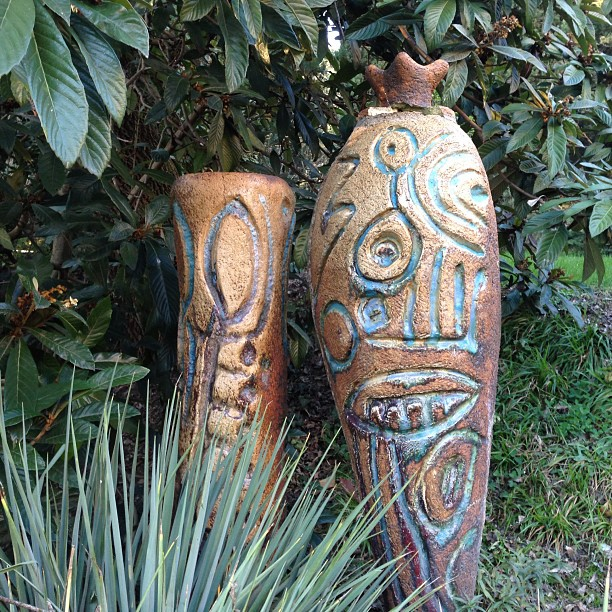
Two stoneware figures in the garden of Yalta Hotel Complex

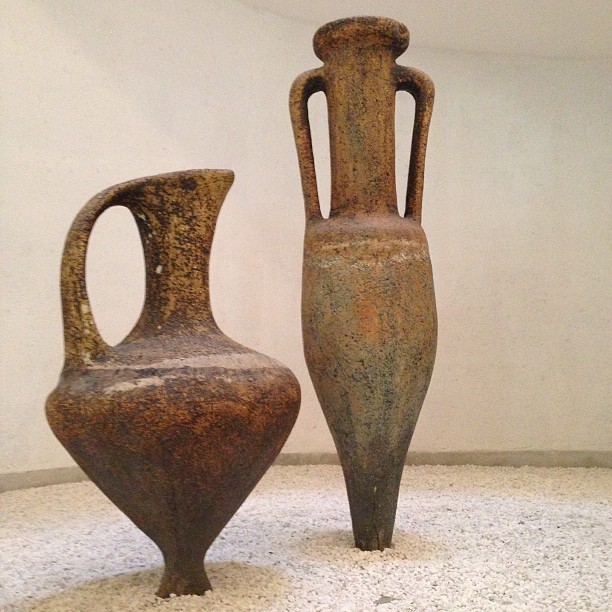
Two amphoras in the swimming pool of Yalta Hotel Complex

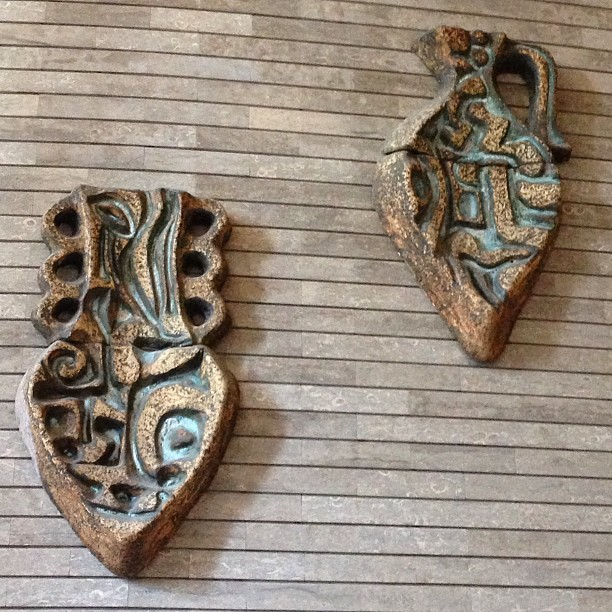
Two wall amphoras in the swimming pool of Yalta Hotel Complex

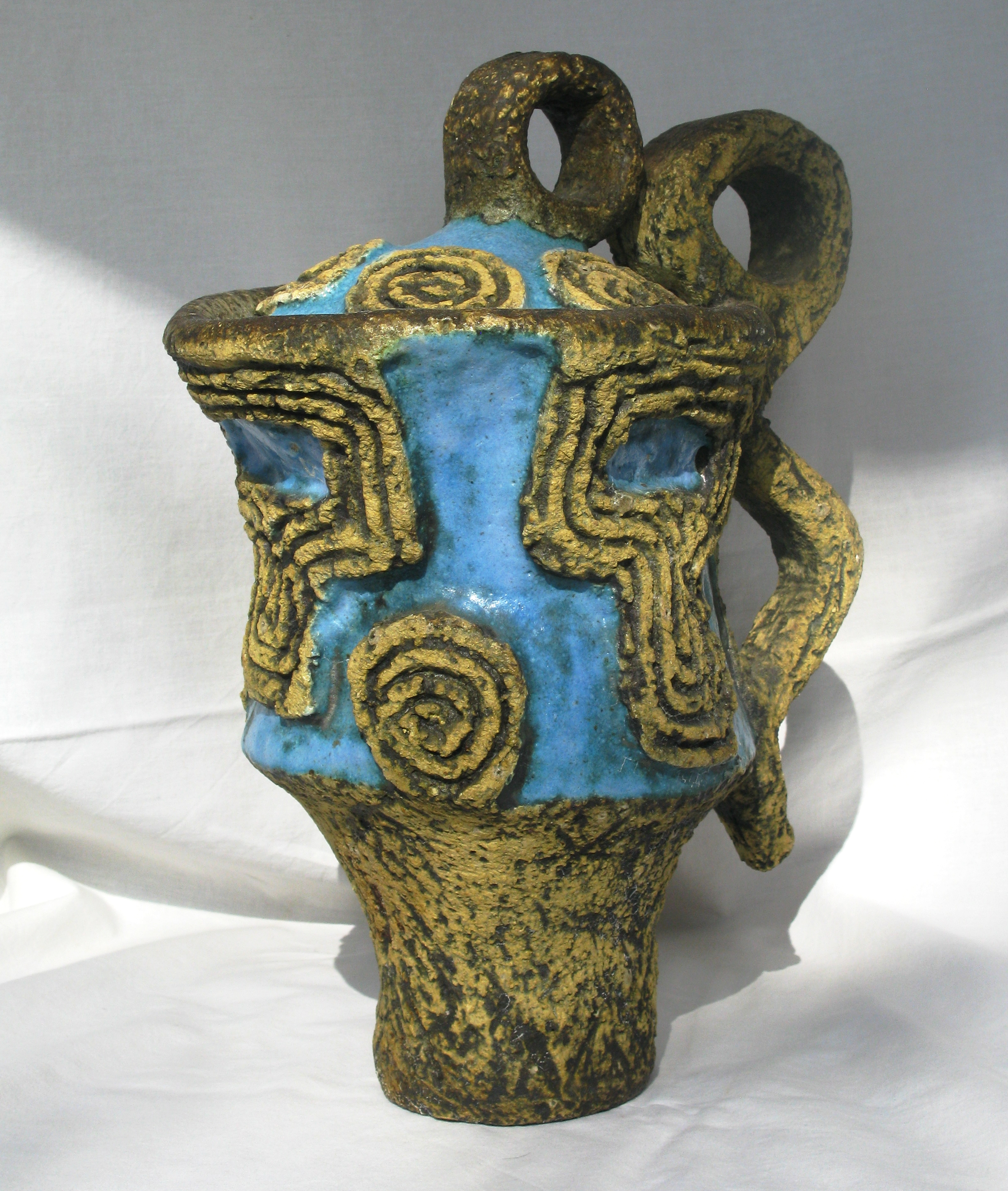
Vessel, glazed chamotte

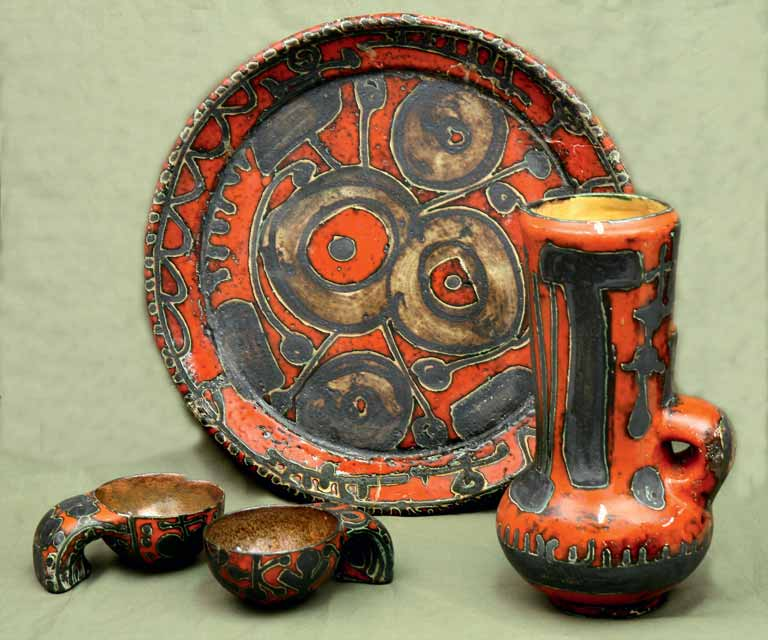
Table set, 1979

=== Paintings ===
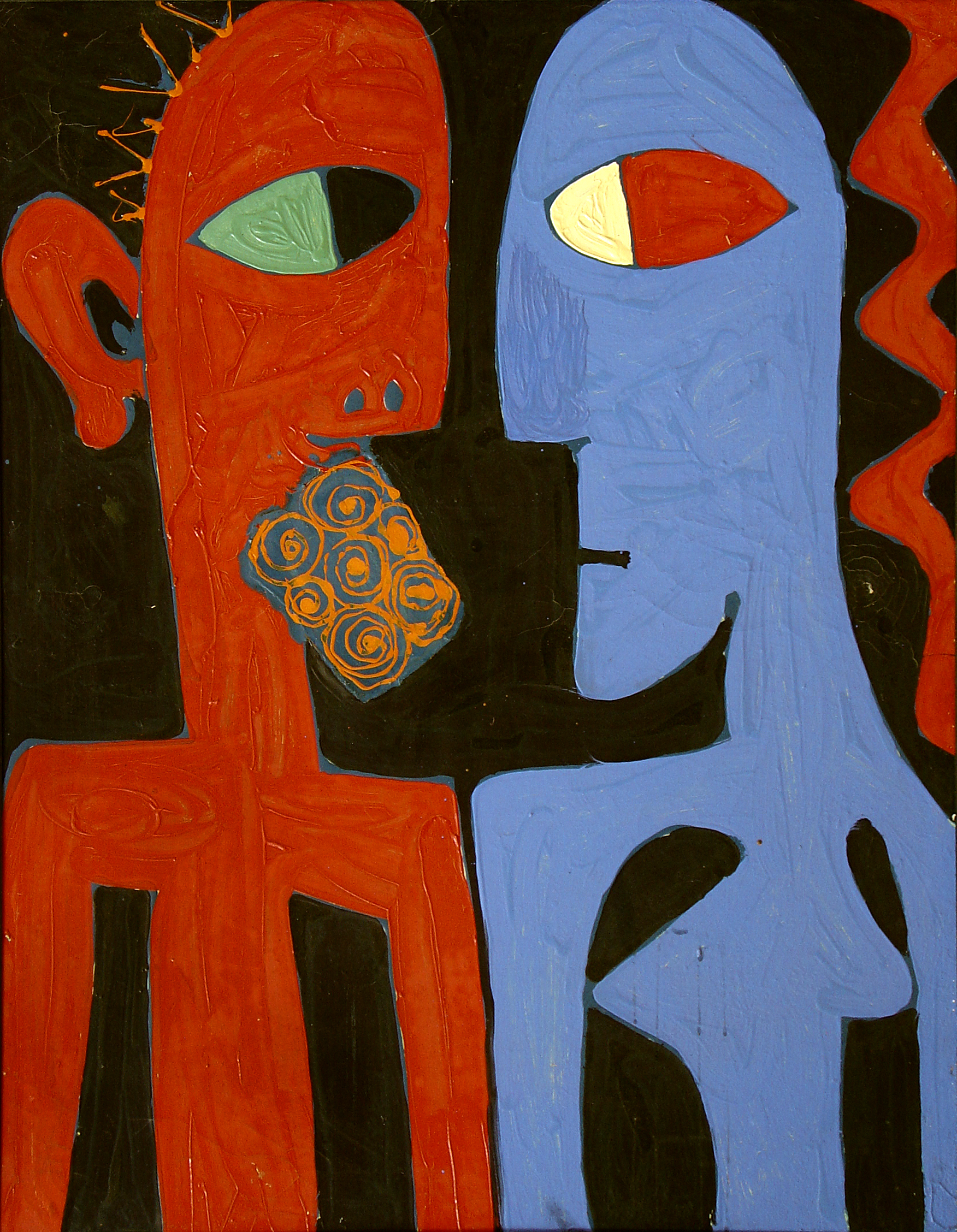
Adam and Eve, 1979, oil canvas, 75x58

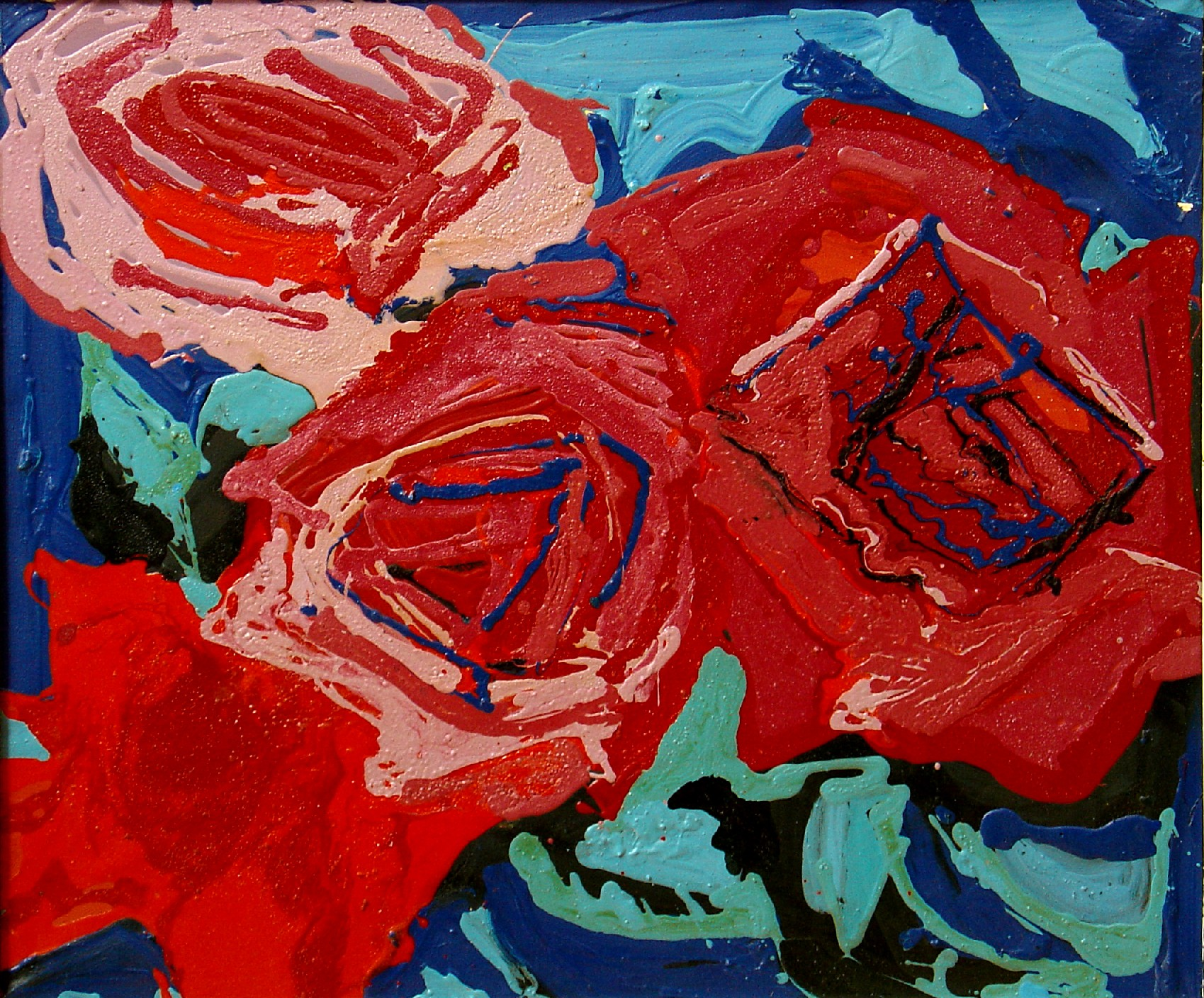
Roses, 1979, oil canvas, 57x68

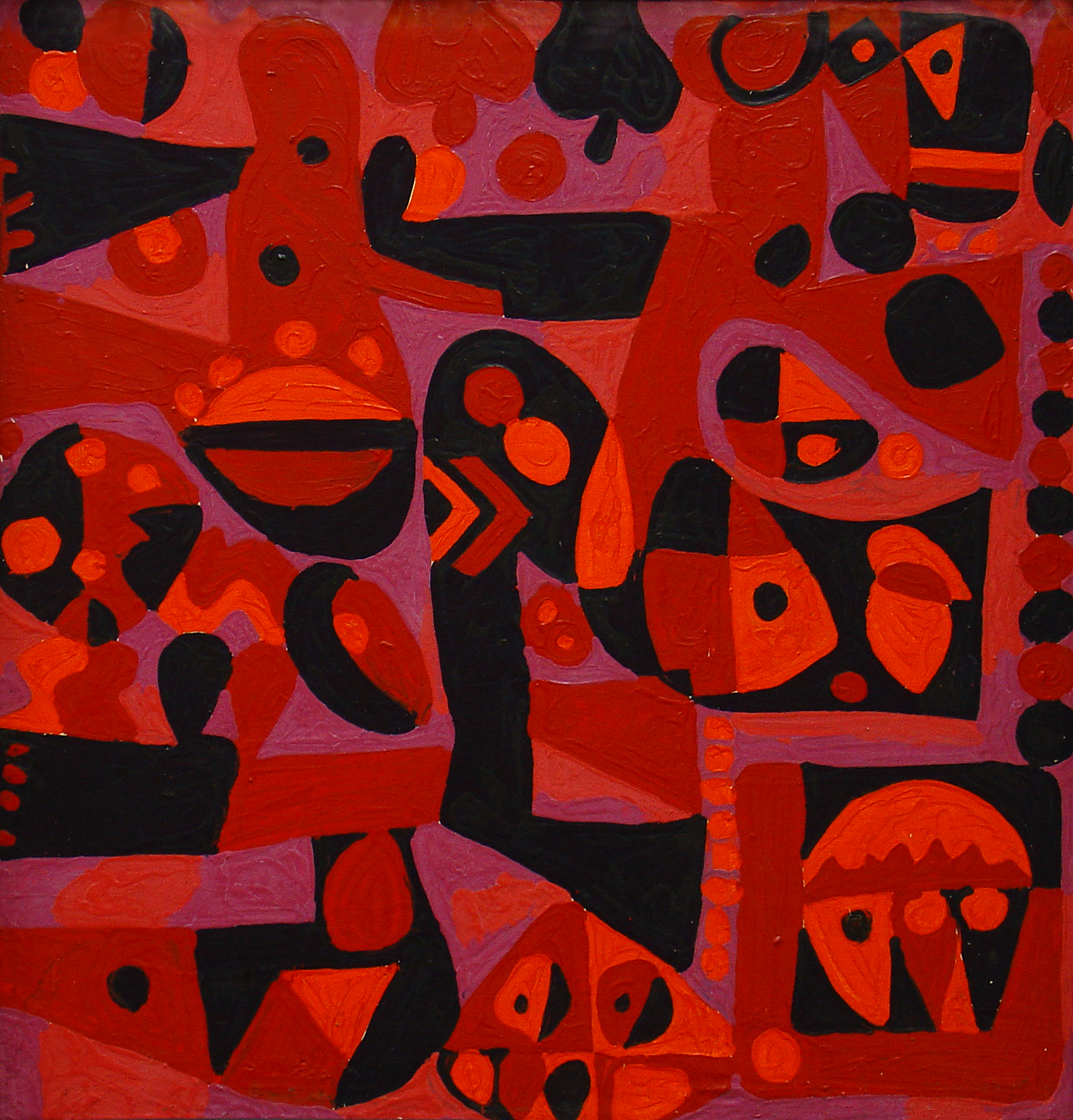
About love, 1980, oil canvas, 100x95

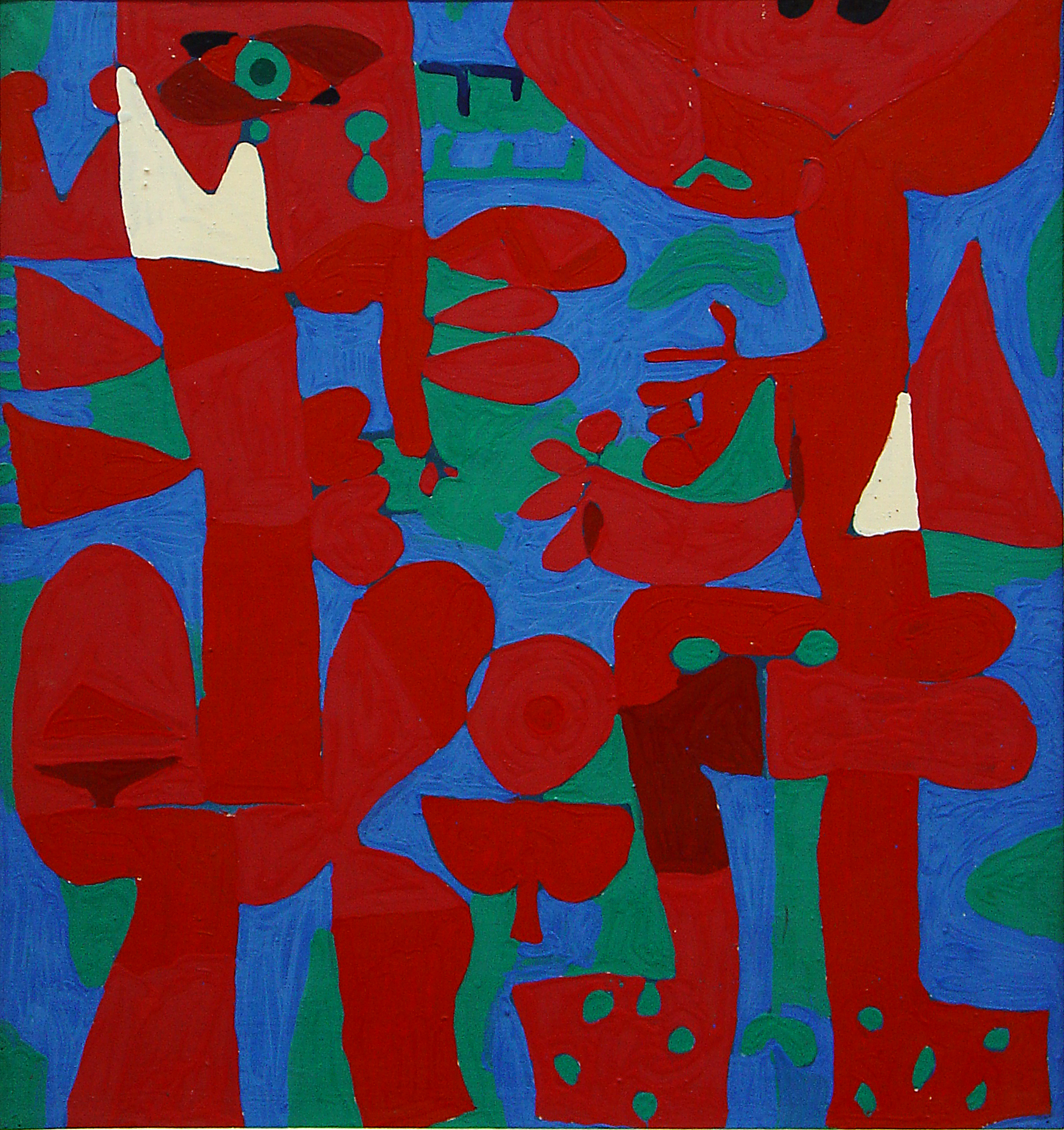
Confession, 1980, oil canvas, 100x93

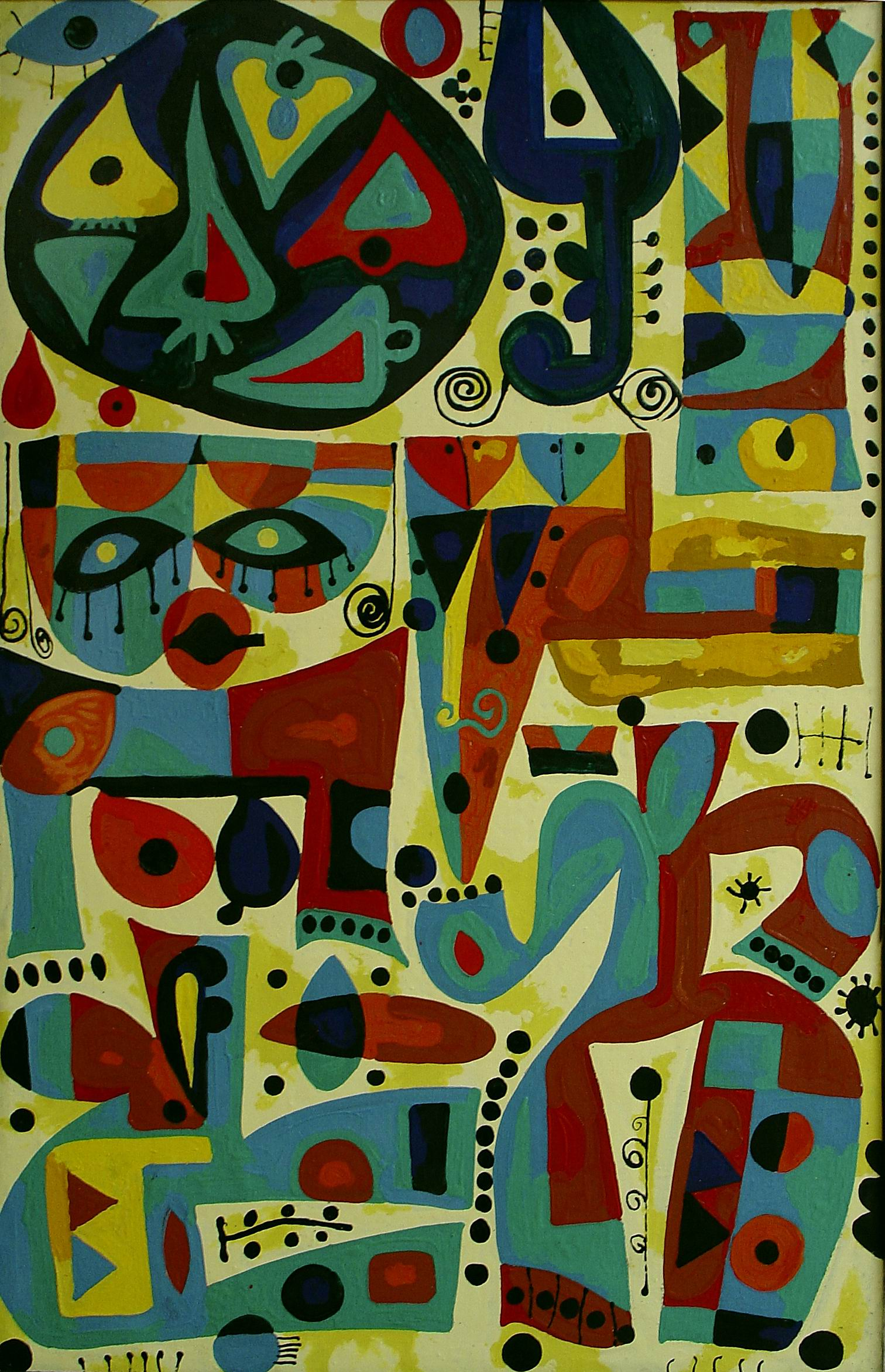
Composition, 1980, oil canvas, 105x65

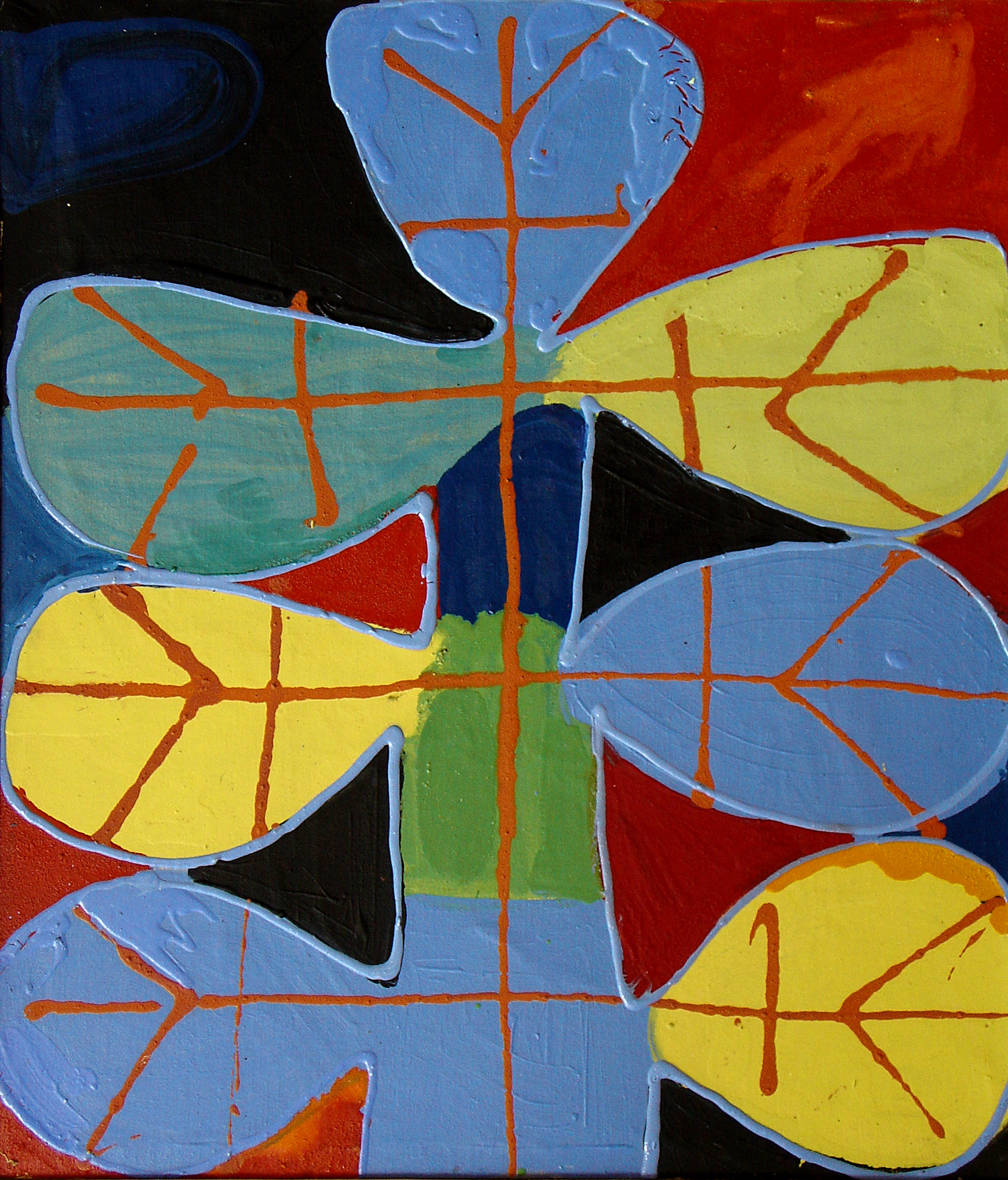
The Seven Leaf Plant, 1980, oil canvas, 72x63

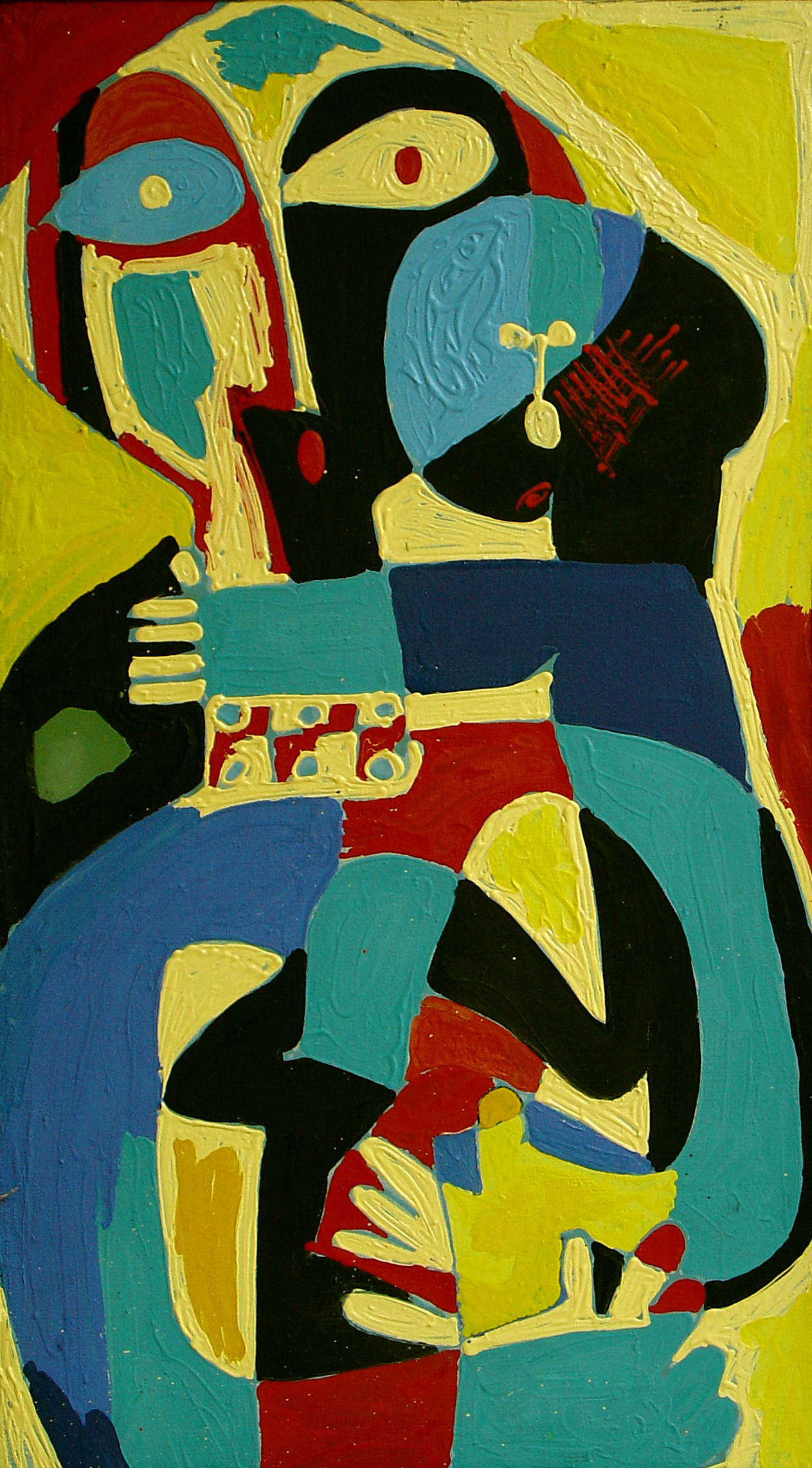
Madonna and Child, 1981, oil canvas, 100x53

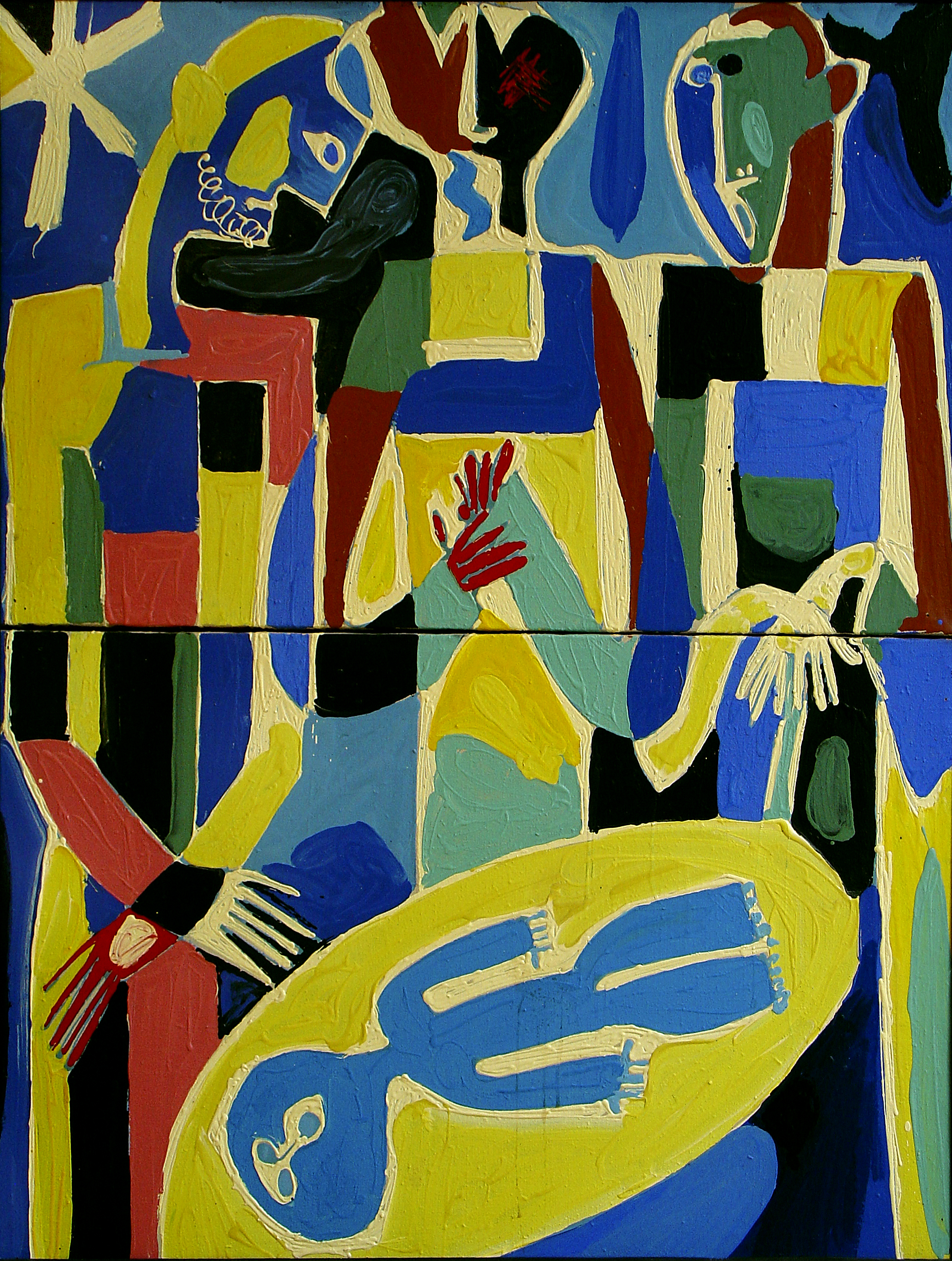
Magi, 1981, oil canvas, 128х102

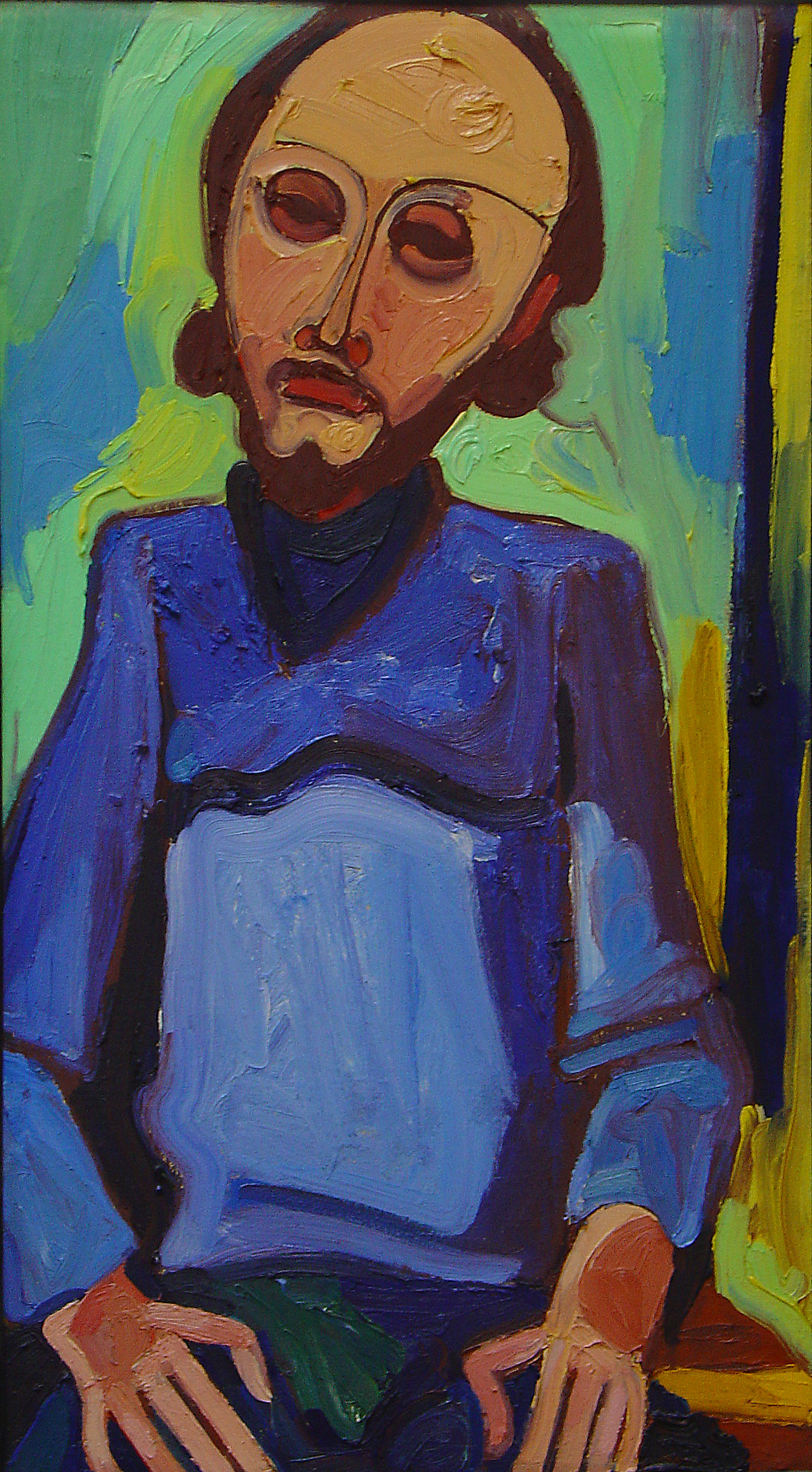
Sergey, 1982, oil canvas, 113x63

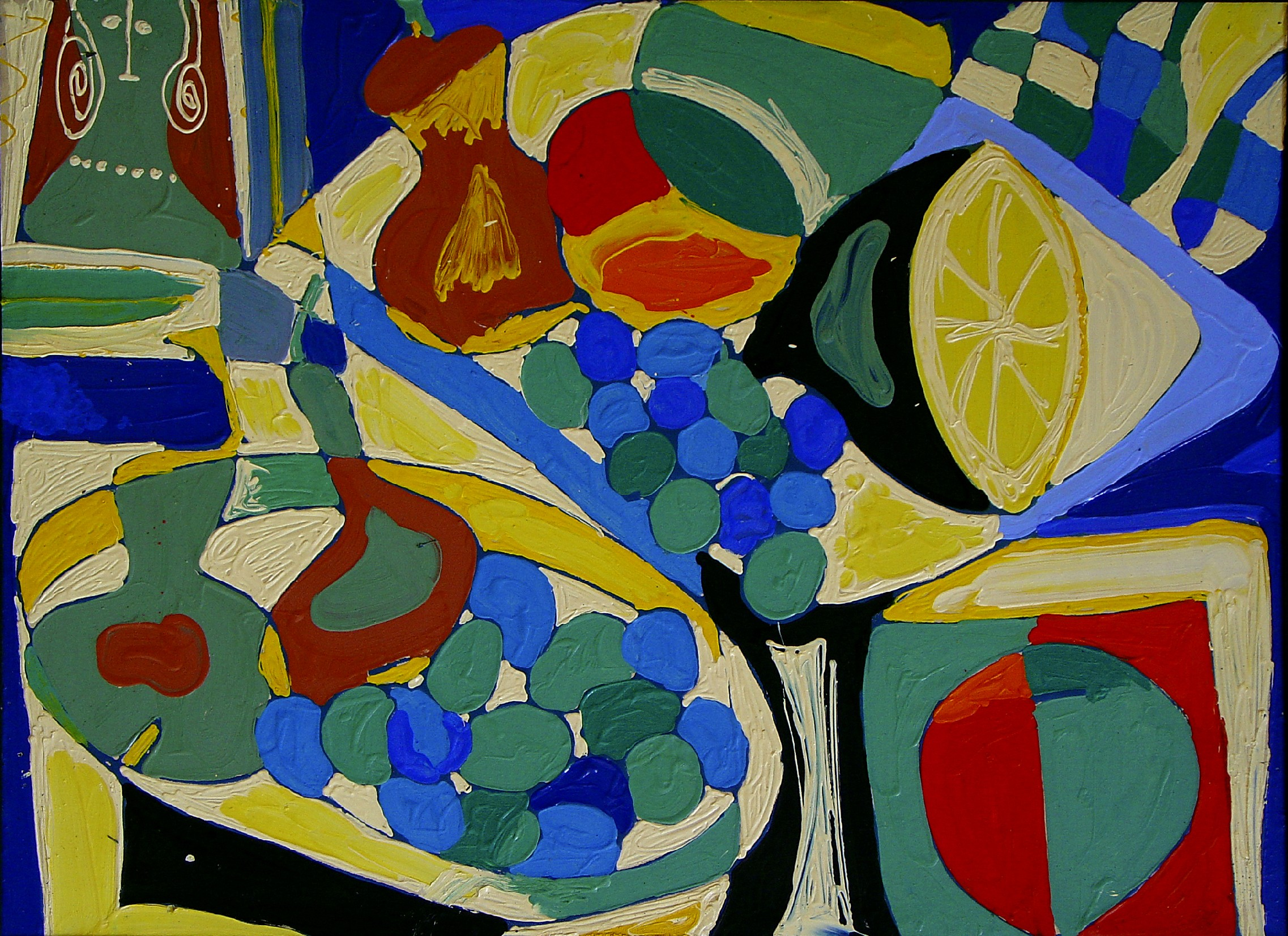
Still Life with Lemon, 1982, oil canvas, 85x90

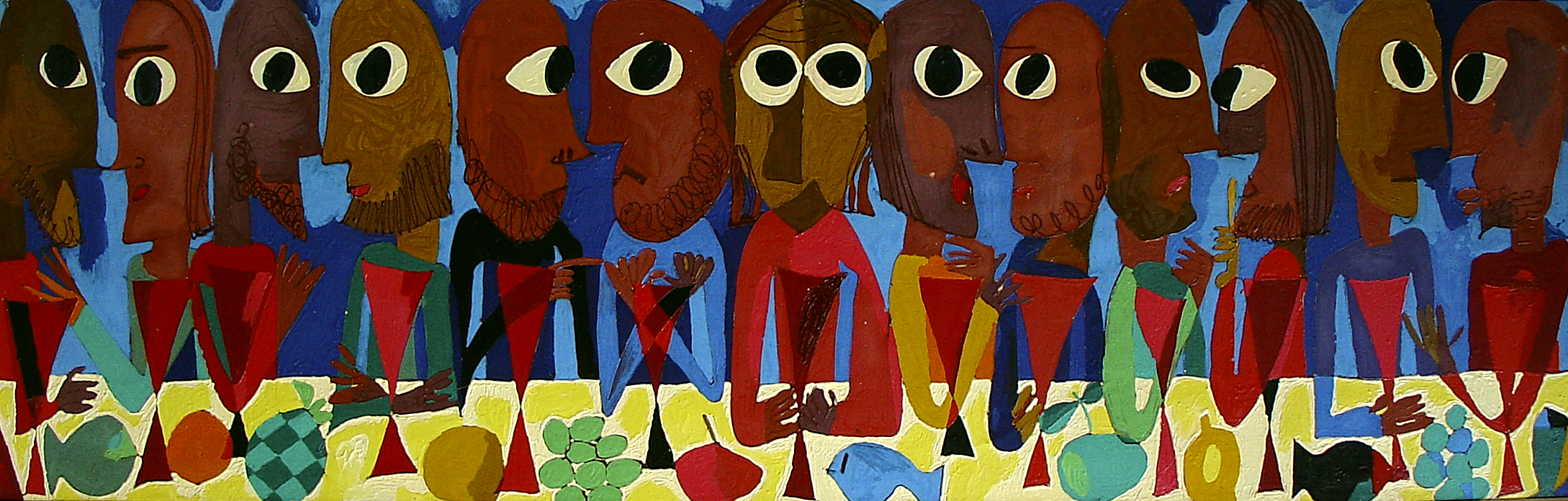
Lord's Supper, 1982, oil canvas, 85x320
