= Battle of Sumy =

Clashes during the 2022 Russian invasion of Ukraine

- Part of the northern front of the Russian invasion of Ukraine
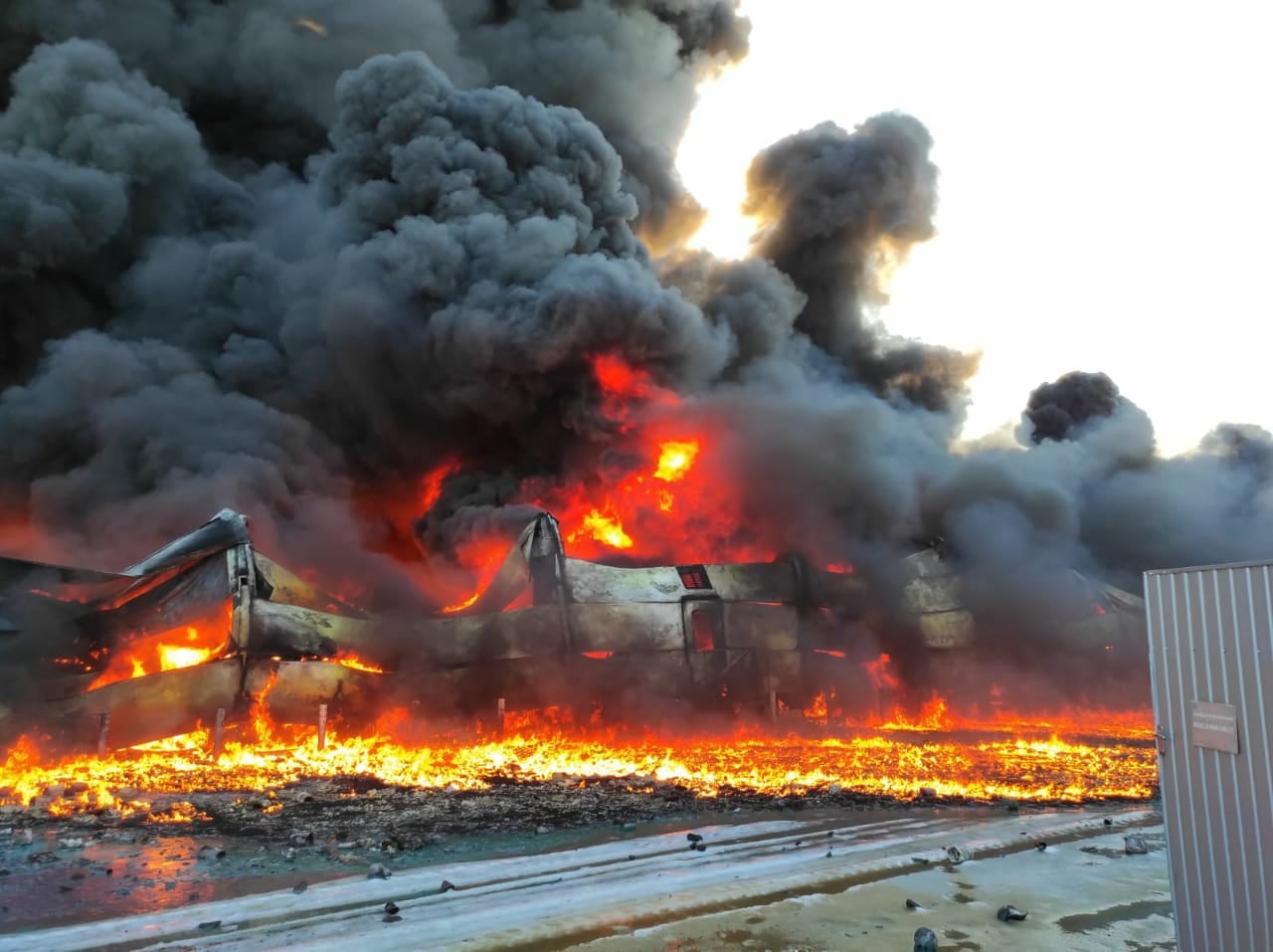
- A storage building on fire after the Russian shelling of Sumy in March 2022
Date	24 February – early March 2022
Location	Sumy, Sumy Oblast, Ukraine 50°54′24.0″N 34°47′57.0″E
Result	Ukrainian victory

Belligerents
Russia	Ukraine

Units involved
	27th Artillery Brigade; 81st Airmobile Brigade; Territorial Defense Forces

Casualties and losses
Unknown	Per Ukraine: 81+ killed 12+ wounded
- Per Ukraine: At least 100 civilians killed

On 24 February 2022, the first day of the Russian invasion of Ukraine, a military engagement took place in the city of Sumy, located near the Russia–Ukraine border. Ukrainian paratroopers and territorial defense forces began engaging Russian forces within the city, resulting in heavy urban fighting and the destruction of a Russian tank column. That evening, Ukraine's paratroopers were ordered to withdraw from the city, leaving the city's defense to a few thousand local volunteers armed with rifles, limited anti-tank weapons and no armed vehicles or heavy weaponry. After three to four days of failing to enter the city, the Russian military shifted to encircle and bypass the city, and were then subject to guerrilla ambushes.

== Battle ==
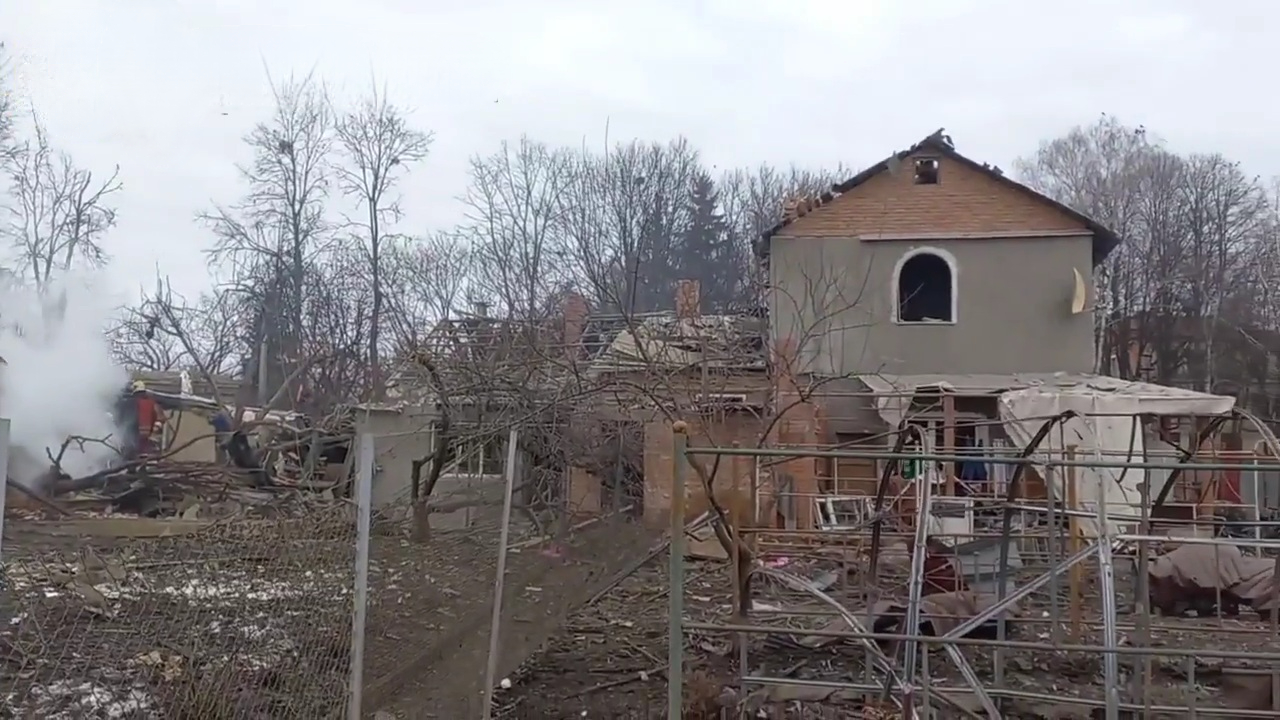
A damaged building in Sumy on 27 February 2022

Russian units began to move into Sumy Oblast on 24 February 2022. Russian military vehicles were spotted near the villages of Bezdryk, Holovashivka, and Postolne by 13:35, and Ukrainian officials announced that a battle had broken out in the city on the Bilopillia highway by 13:40. There was an extensive amount of urban warfare between the Ukrainian defenders and Russian forces. The first fighting took place at the northern and western entrances to the city, on the Kursk highway and Bilopillia highway, respectively. The fiercest combat took place on Kondratieva street, near the city's cadet school, where the Ukrainian 27th Artillery Brigade was stationed. After the clashes in the afternoon, a second round of combat began there around 22:30, with the Russians retreating from the area by 01:39 the next day. A nearby church burned down as a result of the battle. Overnight, Russian troops set up camps near the villages of Kosivshchyna, Tokari, and Nyzhnia Syrovatka outside of the city.

Hundreds of policemen had been ordered to evacuate the city towards Poltava and Cherkasy early in the invasion, so during the first days of the battle, Sumy's defenders were almost entirely civilian Territorial Defence Forces units. Thousands of firearms were quickly gathered from warehouses around the city and distributed to the volunteers. The 5th Battalion Tactical Group of the 81st Airmobile Brigade, a "small military unit", was also present in Sumy and had received instructions on 24 February to hold it at any cost. A few days later, the brigade was moved to Lebedyn.

On 26 February, fighting again broke out on the streets of Sumy. A Russian column passed through Yunakivka in the morning, and one of its vehicles was captured by territorial defense fighters on the Kursk highway. Ukrainian territorial defense forces also allegedly destroyed a convoy of Russian fuel trucks moving towards Kyiv on the Kursk highway. Mayor Oleksandr Lysenko reported three civilian deaths on 26 February, including one killed when Russian BM-21 Grad vehicles fired missiles into Veterenivka, a residential area in the western part of Sumy. A building of the Sumy National Agrarian University, a home for the elderly, and houses along the Bilopillia highway were reportedly hit by Russian shelling; residents claimed the shells were fired came from the direction of Kosivshchyna. According to locals, shelling also took place in Kosivshchyna itself, as well as the areas of Teplychnyi, Luka, and Kurska.

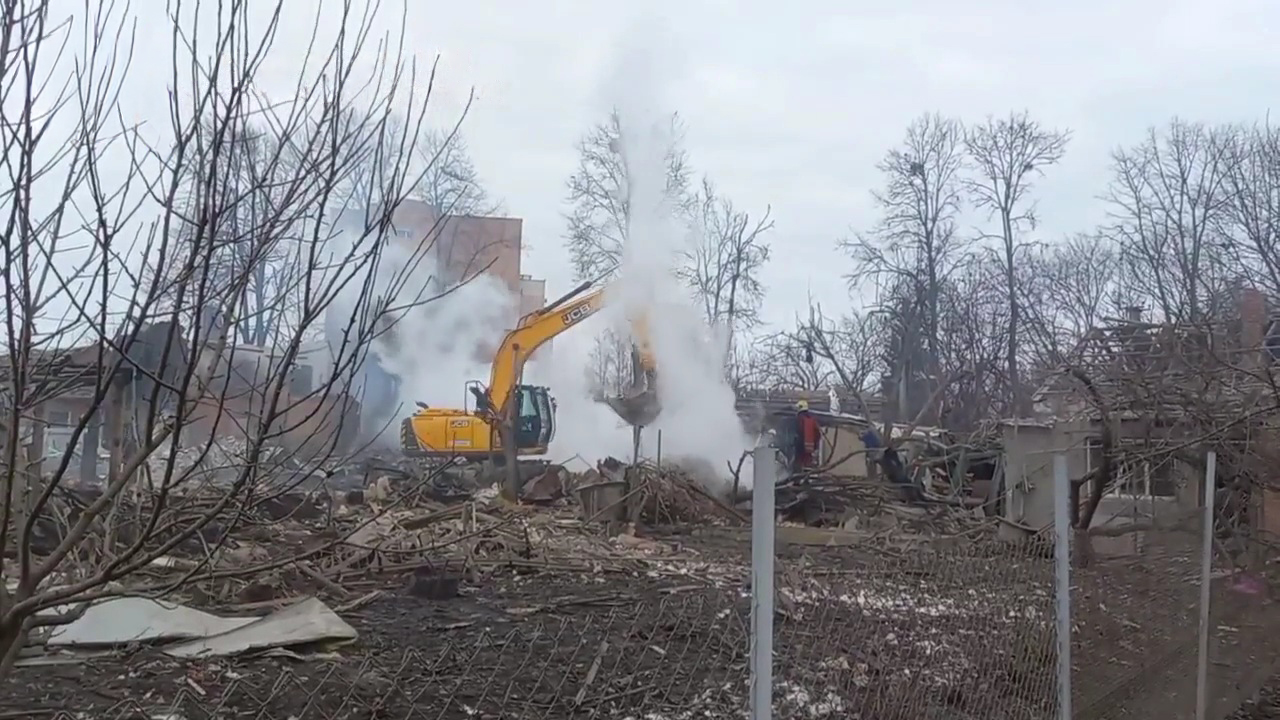
Evacuation attempts at the destroyed building in Veretenivka

On the morning of 27 February, a column of Russian vehicles advanced into Sumy from the direction of Sumykhimprom, a chemical plant east of the city. A civilian car was shot at by Russian forces near the Sumy Airport, resulting in civilian casualties. Meanwhile, fighting was said to be ongoing in Sumy, Nyzy, and Bezdryk. Two Russian soldiers and a BTR were captured by territorial defense forces at the Sumy-Tovarna railway station. An additional three Russian tank crewmen were captured by territorial defense forces in the forests between Tokari and Pishchane. The Russians claimed that they had not been told they would be entering Ukrainian territory, having been under the impression that they were participating in exercises. During the day, combat was reported at Verkhnia Syrovatka, and Russian military vehicles were reported to be moving through Stare Selo.

A battle took place near the villages of Verkhnia Syrovatka and Nyzhnia Syrovatka on 1 March, in which five Ukrainian fighters were killed, including their commander, sergeant major Oleksandr Korzhaiev.

== Bombardment ==
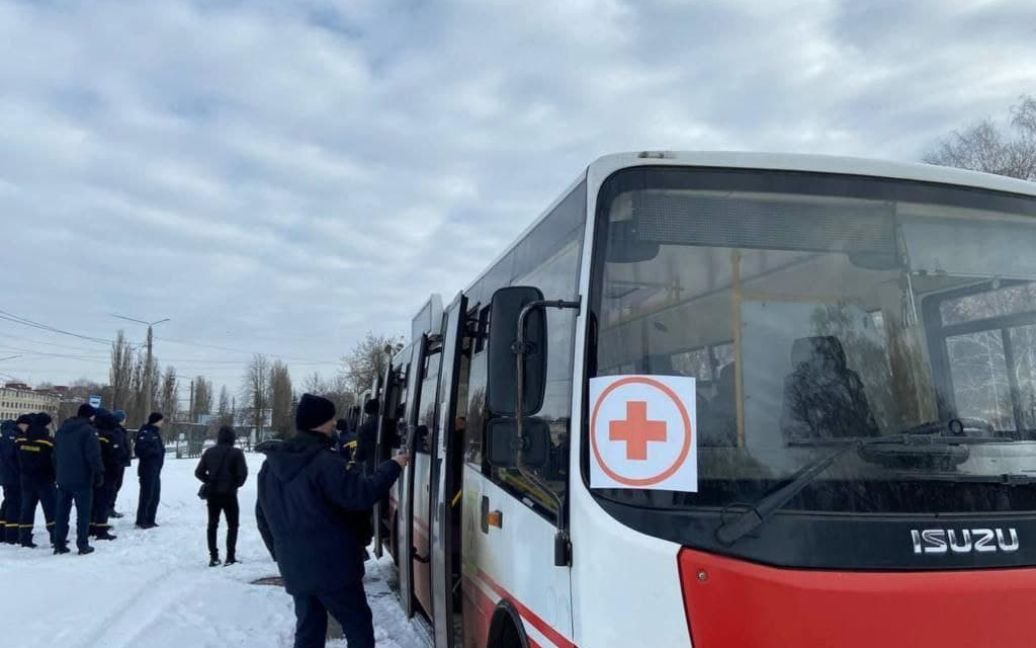
Evacuation attempts by bus via "green corridors"

On 3 March, Dmytro Zhyvytskyi, governor of Sumy Oblast, stated that five people were injured from shelling on buildings of the 27th Artillery Brigade and the military department at Sumy State University. More than 500 international students were trapped since roads and bridges out of the city had been destroyed and fighting was reported in the streets of Sumy.

Zhyvytskyi stated on 8 March that 22 civilians were killed overnight due to a Russian airstrike hitting a residential area, and that four soldiers were killed in combat with the Russian military. An evacuation of civilians from the city began during the day under an agreement for a humanitarian corridor reached with Russia. Zhyvytskyi later stated that about 5,000 people were evacuated during the day.

The Russian military shelled the village of Bezdryk on 13 March and Nyzy, Sumy, and Verkhnia Syrovatka on 14 March. According to locals, the shelling came from the direction of the village of Hrebenykivka. On 15 March, over one hundred instances of shelling were recorded on the city of Sumy and its outskirts, according to Ukrainian territorial defense forces. Affected locations included the village of Tokari and the neighborhood of Khimmistechko.

On 18 March, Russian forces shelled the warehouse of a paint manufacturer in Sumy, causing a large fire. Residents of Khimmistechko, Basy, Prokofiev, Nyzy, Stare Selo were cautioned to close their windows and not go outdoors unless necessary.

On 21 March, an airstrike damaged a fertilizer factory in Sumy, leaking out ammonia and contaminating the surrounding ground. Two days earlier, Russian general Mikhail Mizintsev alleged that Ukrainian nationalists had mined the chemical plant as part of a "false flag" plot. Ukrainian officials called on residents of Novoselysia to seek shelter.

== Russian withdrawal from region ==
The Ukrainian recapture of Trostianets, Sumy Oblast on 26 March was expected by Western media outlets to open up supply routes to relieve the city of Sumy, which was described as "encircled" or "under siege". On the same day, Ukrainian forces captured the villages Steblianky and Boromlia after the withdrawal of Russian troops. By 26 March, Russian forces had also left Velykyi Bobryk and Malyi Vystorop.

By 27 March, the Russian military had withdrawn from some of the villages closest to Sumy, and had detonated a bridge over the Psel River during their retreat.

On 4 April 2022, Governor Zhyvytskyi declared that Russian troops no longer occupied any towns or villages in Sumy Oblast and had mostly withdrawn. According to Zhyvytskyi, Ukrainian troops were working to push out the remaining units. On 8 April 2022, he stated that all Russians troops had left Sumy Oblast, but it was still unsafe due to rigged explosives and other ammunition Russian troops had left behind.

== Aftermath ==
Despite Russian forces withdrawing fully from Sumy Oblast by early April, airstrikes continued throughout April and May.

In mid-May, Russian troops made numerous attempted border crossings in the Sumy area. Shelling of the region from Russia continued for the remainder of the year.

== See also ==
- List of military engagements during the Russian invasion of Ukraine
- Siege of Chernihiv
- Battle of Kyiv (2022)
- Russian occupation of Sumy Oblast
