= Sumykhimprom ammonia leak =

2022 ammonia leak and contamination incident

- Part of the battle of Sumy during the Russian invasion of Ukraine
- Location: 50.876234°N 34.882685°E; Sumykhimprom factory Sumy Oblast, Ukraine
- Date: 21 March 2022; ~04:30 (UTC+3)
- Target: Ammonia production
- Attack type: Airstrike
- Perpetrators: Russian Armed Forces (Per Ukraine); Armed Forces of Ukraine (Per Russia)

On 21 March 2022 during the battle of Sumy, a Russian airstrike damaged one of the ammonia tanks at the Sumykhimprom plant, contaminating land within a 2.5 kilometres (1.6 mi) radius including the villages of Novoselytsia and Verkhnia Syrovatka. Due to the direction of the wind, the city of Sumy was largely unaffected despite its proximity to the leak.

== Background ==
Two days prior to the leak Mikhail Mizintsev, the Chief of Russia's National Defense Management Center claimed that Ukrainian nationalists were plotting a false flag chemical attack in Sumy. Mizintsev alleged on 19 March that mines had been placed in chemical storage facilities at the plant to poison residents in case of Russian troops advancement into the city. He also alleged that a secondary school was similarly sabotaged in Kotliareve, Mykolaiv Oblast.

== Leak ==
The leak was first reported at about 4:30 am local time on 21 March 2022 at the Sumykhimprom chemical plant, located in the suburbs of Sumy.
