= Oleksiy Shelest =

Ukrainian race walker

Personal information
- Full name: Oleksiy Petrovych Shelest
- Nationality: Ukraine
- Born: 27 March 1973 (age 53) Kosivshchyna, Ukrainian SSR, Soviet Union
- Height: 1.74 m (5 ft 8 1/2 in)
- Weight: 65 kg (143 lb)

Sport
- Sport: Athletics
- Event: Race walking
- Club: Kolos Sumska Oblast

Achievements and titles
- Personal bests: 10 km walk: 39:50 (2003); 20 km walk: 1:22:40 (2009); 50 km walk: 3:53:46 (2012)

Oleksiy Petrovych Shelest (Ukrainian: Олексій Петрович Шелест; born 27 March 1973) is a Ukrainian race walker. He has competed in the Olympics twice and is a five-time national champion for the 50 km race walk.

Shelest first competed for the men's 50 km race walk at the 2000 Summer Olympics in Sydney, where he finished the race in 32nd place, with a time of 4:07:39. He made a comeback from his eight-year absence at the 2008 Summer Olympics in Beijing to race for the second time in the 50 km walk, along with his compatriots Serhiy Budza and Oleksiy Kazanin. Shelest improved his performance by finishing 29th in the event, under four minutes at 3:59:46.
