= Sumy urban hromada =

Urban hromada of Sumy Oblast, Ukraine

Sumy urban hromada Сумьска міська громада
- Hromada
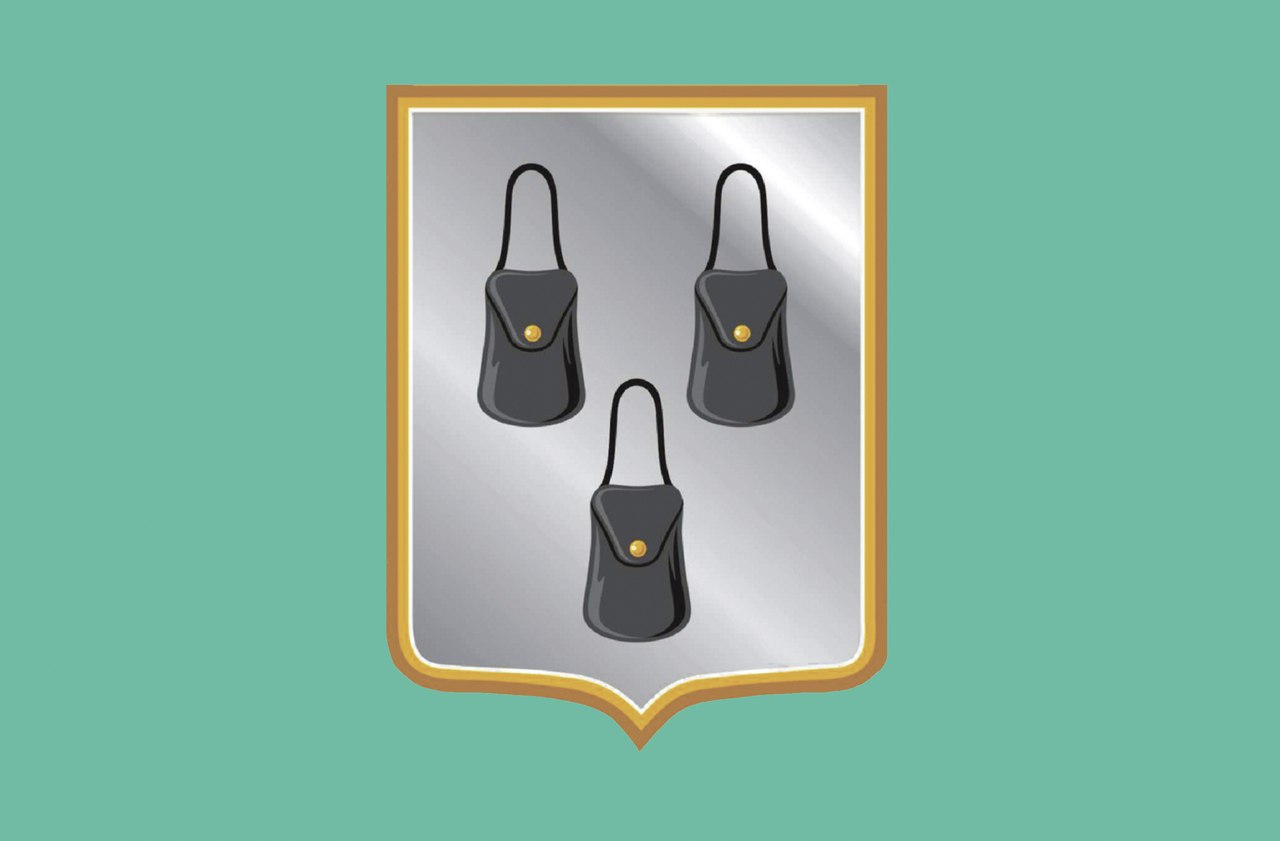
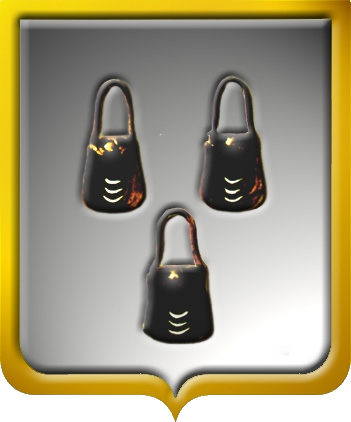
- Flag Seal
- Interactive map of Sumy urban hromada
- Location within Sumy Oblast Location within Ukraine
- Coordinates: 50°54′43″N 34°48′10″E
- Country: Ukraine
- Oblast (province): Sumy Oblast
- Raion (district): Sumy Raion

Area
  - Total: 349.0 km^{2} (134.7 sq mi)

Population (2023)
  - Total: 279,620
- Website: smr.gov.ua/uk/

Sumy urban territorial hromada (Ukrainian: Сумська міська територіальна громада, romanized: Sumska miska terytorialna hromada) is one of Ukraine's hromadas. It is located in Sumy Raion, Sumy Oblast, and its administrative centre is the city of Sumy.

The hromada has an area of 349.0 km^{2} (134.7 mi^{2}), as well as a population of 279,620 (as of 2023). It was originally established as an amalgamated hromada on 24 April 2019 before being expanded into its current form as part of decentralisation in Ukraine.

== Composition ==
In addition to one city (Sumy), the hromada includes 20 villages:

- Bytytsia
- Kardashivka
- Khomyne
- Kyryiakivshchyna
- Lypniak
- Mykilske
- Pishchane
- Pushkarivka
- Radkivka
- Rybtsi
- Shevchenkove
- Stetskivka
- Trokhymenkove
- Vakalivshchyna
- Velyka Chernechchyna
- Verkhnie Pishchane
- Vilshanka
- Zahirske
- Zelenyi Hai
- Zhyteiske
