= Tokari, Bezdryk rural hromada =

Village in Sumy Oblast, Ukraine

Tokari Токарі
- Village
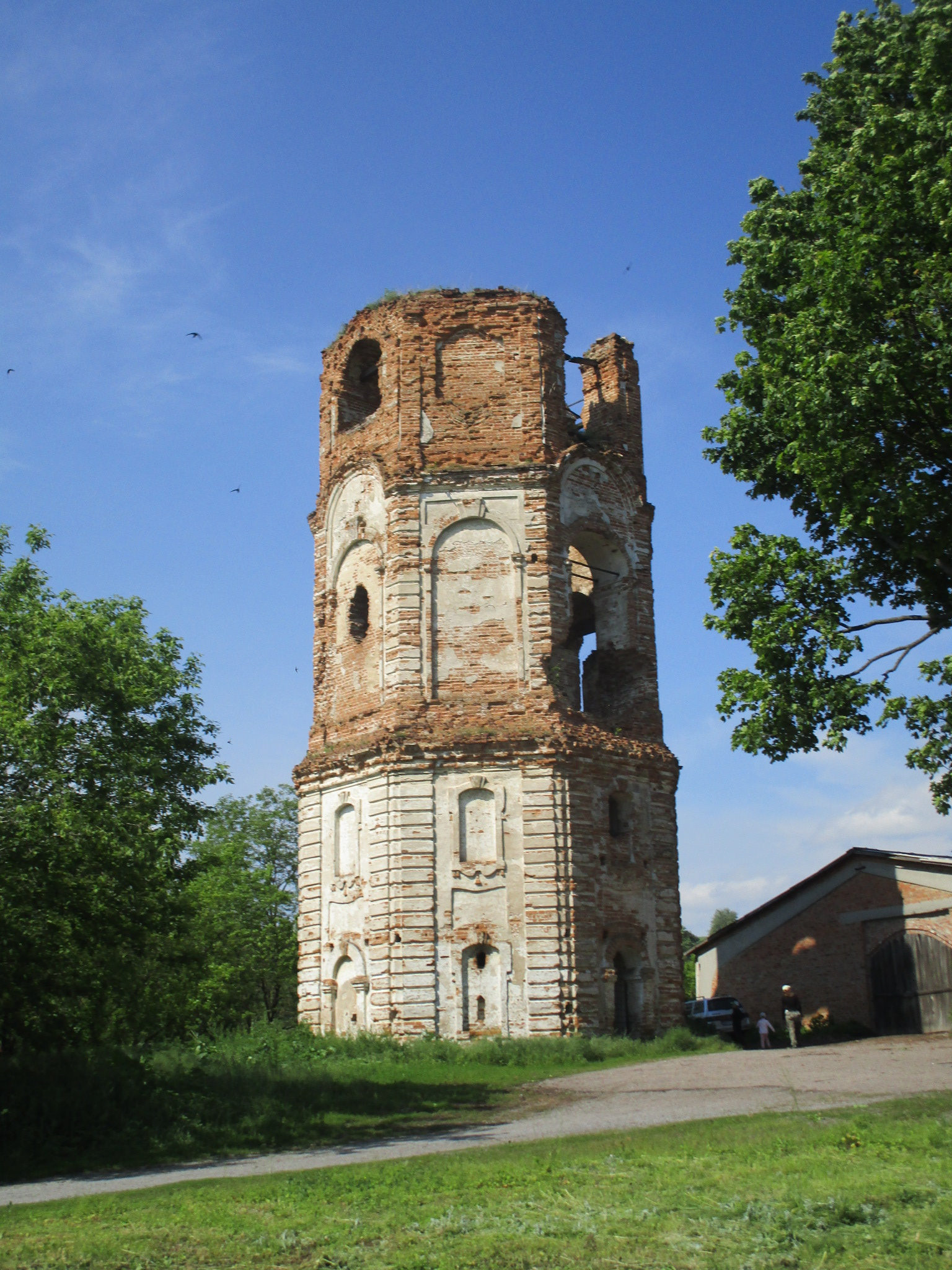
- Bell tower of the former monastery

- Location of Tokari in Sumy Oblast Location of Tokari in Ukraine
- Coordinates: 50°55′18″N 34°54′25″E
- Country: Ukraine
- Oblast: Sumy Oblast
- Raion: Sumy Raion
- Hromada: Bezdryk rural hromada
- Established: 1732

Area
  - Total: 5.2 km^{2} (2.0 sq mi)
  - Land: 4.8 km^{2} (1.9 sq mi)
  - Water: 0.4 km^{2} (0.15 sq mi)

Population
  - Total: 1,848
- Postal code: 42334

Tokari (Ukrainian: Токарі) is a village in Ukraine, in Bezdryk rural hromada of Sumy Raion of Sumy Oblast. The population is 1,848 people. The former local government body is Tokari Village Council.

== Geography ==
A drying stream with three ponds flows through the village. The length of the ponds is 725, 680 and 1200 meters, the width varies from 120 to 220 meters. Local names of the ponds: Smahynskyi, Tsentralnyi and Kolhospnyi.

There is a large chemical waste dump in the village area. 1.3 km east of the village is a quarry-dump used by JSC Sumykhimprom. This dump is very harmful to the ecology of the village of Tokari and threatens the health of residents.

Previously, there were two villages: Tokari and Mala Chernechchyna (Monastyrok), later merged into one – Tokari.

== Etymology ==
According to one of the legends, it got its name from the surname of Mr. Tokarev, who previously owned it.

== History ==
The territory of this region began to be inhabited in the Stone Age. The first inhabitants appeared 15 thousand years ago. This is confirmed by the fact that even today in the area of Tokari meadow (1 km from Shevchenko Street) fragments of mammoth tusks and teeth and ancient utensils are found (the last find dates back to 2008). In 1921, a plow from Scythian times was found on the Tokari peat bog. This unique monument is now stored in the funds of the Sumy Regional Museum of Local Lore. Several Chernyakhiv settlements were discovered on the Tokari lands. One of them, located on the western outskirts of the village, measuring 500 m×80 m, was explored in 1987. Materials of the Catacomb Culture of the Early Iron Age were found here, as well as the Chernyakhiv Culture, in particular, molded and pottery ceramics, Saltiv container vessels and a rare bronze fibula (a clasp for a cape or cloak) of the 5th century AD. During the 3rd–5th centuries, the Kyiv culture existed on the Left Bank of the Dnipro. This is evidenced by individual finds of this period, discovered during archaeological excavations in the village of Tokary. In the 7th–9th centuries, the territory of our region was occupied by a tribal union of northerners. Life on these lands somewhat froze in the 12th–13th centuries, and with the advent of the Golden Horde era, this region was part of the Wild Fields. The Crimean Tatar raids later became a terrible disaster, which led to the further desolation of the region.

The village was founded in 1732, one of the wealthiest gentlemen was a certain Ignatiev. His estate stood on a hill, on the site of modern Komsomolska Street. Until 1941, a boarding school for children operated in the building of the Ignatiev estate.

In the 1760s, Hryhorii Skovoroda lived in the building of the now dilapidated monastery in Mala Chernechchyna.

A certain Ignatiev was also the last "district leader of the nobility". But Smahynske is from Mr. Smagin. with whom, according to a source about Archimandrite Shubsky Yakov, he lived out his life from November 1789 and died on February 14, 1790. The part of the village, which among the locals used to be called Monastyryok, was exactly that, a monastery that kept the miraculous image of Christ the Savior, with which, according to the Decree of the Holy Synod, annual constant processions were carried out to Velyka Chernechchyna.

In 1990, an outpatient clinic was built in the village.

On 12 June 2020, in accordance with the Resolution of the Cabinet of Ministers of Ukraine No. 723-r "On the determination of administrative centers and approval of the territories of territorial hromadas of Sumy Oblast", it became part of the Bezdryk rural hromada.

On 19 July 2020, as a result of the administrative-territorial reform and liquidation of 1923–2020 Sumy Raion, it became part of the newly formed Sumy Raion.

=== Russian invasion of Ukraine (since 2022) ===
As of 05:00 on August 26, 2024, 3 explosions were recorded in the village, probably guided aviabombs. As a result of the shelling, 1 civilian was killed and 2 were injured, 12 private houses were damaged. Also was 1 explosion, probably FPV drone. At around 8 p.m. on November 25, the Russian army attacked the Bezdryk hromada of Sumy Raion with 3 missiles. As a result of the shelling of the village of Tokari, 8 houses were damaged, there were no injuries or deaths.

== Demographics ==
=== Language ===
Distribution of the population by native language according to UKR-socialdata-mova-2001:

Language	Quantity	Percent
Ukrainian	1716	92.86%
Russian	113	6.11%
Belarusian	8	0.43%
Romanian	2	0.11%
Bulgarian	1	0.05%
other/not specified	8	0.44%
Total	1848	100%

== Sports facilities ==
- Olympic training base for skiers and biathletes.

== Notable people ==
Vertynsky Oleksyi Sergiyovych – famous film actor. Honored Artist of Ukraine. Laureate of the theater award "Kyiv Pectoral".
