= 27th Artillery Brigade (Ukraine) =

Ukrainian Ground Forces unit

- 27-ма артилерійська бригада
- Insignia of the brigade
- Active: May 14, 2008 – present
- Country: Ukraine
- Branch: Ukrainian Ground Forces
- Type: Rocket and Artillery Forces
- Role: Artillery
- Size: 1,500 - 10,000
- Garrison/HQ: Sumy, Sumy Oblast
- Patron: Petro Kalnyshevskyi
- Engagements: Russo-Ukrainian War
- Website: Official Facebook page

Recon UAV operator of the Brigade

The 27th Artillery Brigade named after Kish otaman Petro Kalnyshevskyi (Ukrainian: 27-ма артилерійська бригада ім. кошового отамана Петра Калнишевського) is a brigade of the Ukrainian Ground Forces.

== History ==
The 27th Artillery Brigade traces its origins to 2008, when it was established in Sumy following the disbandment of the Sumy Institute of Missile and Artillery Troops. Initially formed as the 27th Rocket Artillery Regiment, the unit was officially presented with its battle flag on December 5, 2008. In early 2015, the regiment underwent reorganization and expansion, transforming into the 27th Rocket Artillery Brigade.

The brigade first saw action in the war in Donbas in July 2014, where it carried out fire missions across the Luhansk and Donetsk regions.

Over time, the unit transitioned from Soviet BM-27 Uragan to more advanced equipment, becoming one of the first Ukrainian formations to operate HIMARS multiple launch rocket systems during Russias invasion. During Ukraine's 2023 counteroffensive, the brigade fought on the Zaporizhzhia front. The following year, in 2024, it also contributed to Ukraine's offensive operations in the Kursk region.

On April 13, 2025, its commander, Colonel Yurii Yula, was killed in a Russian Iskander missile strike on Sumy. Later that same year, the brigade underwent another transformation, reorganizing into an Artillery Brigade.

== Structure ==
As of 2025, the brigade's structure was as following:

- 27th Artillery Brigade
  - Headquarters & Headquarters Company
  - 1st Artillery Battalion
  - 2nd Artillery Battalion
  - 3rd Artillery Battalion
  - 4th Artillery Battalion
  - Artillery Reconnaissance Battalion
  - Engineer Company
  - Maintenance Company
  - Logistic Company
  - Signal Company
  - Radar Company
  - Medical Company
  - CBRN Protection Company
