= Velyka Chernechchyna =

Velyka Chernechchyna Велика Чернеччина
- Village
- Location of Velyka Chernechchyna in Sumy Oblast Location of Velyka Chernechchyna in Ukraine
- Coordinates: 50°57′18″N 34°55′31″E
- Country: Ukraine
- Oblast: Sumy Oblast
- Raion: Sumy Raion
- Hromada: Sumy urban hromada
- Established: c. 1672

Area
  - Total: 4.3 km^{2} (1.7 sq mi)

Population
  - Total: 2,639

Velyka Chernechchyna is a village in Ukraine, in Sumy urban hromada of Sumy Raion of Sumy Oblast. The population is 2,639 people. The former local government body is the Velyka Chernechchyna Village Council.

== Geography ==
The village of Velyka Chernechchyna is located on the left bank of the Psel river, upstream at a distance of 2 km is the village of Vilshanka, downstream at a distance of 0.5 km is the village of Lypnyak, on the opposite bank — the village of Pushkarivka. The river in this place is winding, forming estuaries and swampy lakes (Lake Prirva). The T 1901 highway passes through the village.

== Population ==
=== Language ===
Distribution of the population by native language according to the 2001 census

Language	Quantity	Percentage
Ukrainian	2539	96.21%
Russian	99	3.75%
Armenian	1	0.04%
Total	2639	100%

== History ==
Velika Chernechchyna was founded in 1672. Initially, it belonged to monks (cherntsi), hence the name. Velyka Chernechchyna (Big Chernechchyna) began to be called, unlike Malaya Chernechchyna (Small Chernechchyna), until the beginning of the 19th century the former Chernechchyna farm. Later, Mala Chernechchyna was annexed to the village of Tokari. The heavy feudal oppression of the Sumy Assumption Monastery in 1767 caused 35 families to flee the village. When detained, the fugitives resisted the military command.

As of 1914, the village was the center of a separate Chernechchanska volost, the number of residents increased to 4,470 people.

Since 1917 — as part of the UPR. Only in 1913 was an outpatient clinic opened in Velyka Chernechchyna. In 1929, the primary school was reorganized into a seven-year school. For this purpose, a new brick building with ten rooms was built.

The village suffered as a result of the genocide of the Ukrainian people carried out by the occupying government of the USSR in 1932-1933 and 1946-1947. In the 2000s, a memorial cross was installed at the village cemetery gate in honor of the villagers tortured by hunger.

In 1978, a dairy complex for 1,000 heads of cattle was put into operation and a drainage and irrigation system was put into operation.

On June 12, 2020, in accordance with the Order of the Cabinet of Ministers of Ukraine No. 723-p “On the Determination of Administrative Centers and Approval of Territories of Territorial Communities of Sumy Region”, the village became part of the Sumy Urban Community(Hromada).

On July 19, 2020, as a result of the administrative-territorial reform and liquidation of Sumy Raion —2020), it became part of the newly formed Sumy Raion.

=== Russian invasion of Ukraine ===
On August 27, 2024, the operational command "North" informs about the shelling of the village. 1 explosion was recorded, probably an FPV drone. On September 9, 2024, was recorded 1 explosion, probably a guided aviabomb. As a result of the shelling, a civilian was injured and a critical infrastructure facility was damaged. On September 14, was recorded 4 explosions, probably a guided aviabombs. On May 6, 2025 at 5:36 p.m., russians struck civilian infrastructure in the village of Velyka Chernechchyna with a ballistic missile. Three people were killed and 11 were injured. A shop was destroyed in the village and about 27 houses were damaged. At night, May 15, the russians sent 19 attack UAVs to the village of Velyka Chernechchyna. Seven buildings of enterprises "Andrex" were damaged. There is no information about the dead or injured people. 120 employees were left without work.

== Sights ==
- Vilshanka nature reserve — a landscape nature reserve of local importance.

== Famous people ==
- Vertikova Iryna Hryhorivna — journalist.
- Yelyshevych Hryhoriy Lvovich — poet, fabulist.
- Litvinenko Vasyl Dmytrovych (1895—1966) — Hero of the Soviet Union (1944).
- Semenyuta Anatoliy Mykolayovych — poet.
