= Kosivshchyna =

Village in Sumy Oblast, Ukraine

Kosivshchyna Косівщина
- Village
- Location of Kosivshchyna in Sumy Oblast Location of Kosivshchyna in Ukraine
- Coordinates: 50°54′47″N 34°42′54″E
- Country: Ukraine
- Oblast: Sumy Oblast
- Raion: Sumy Raion
- Hromada: Stepanivka settlement hromada

Area
  - Total: 3.5 km^{2} (1.4 sq mi)

Population
  - Total: 2,516

Kosivshchyna is a village in Ukraine, in the Stepanivka settlement hromada of Sumy Raion of Sumy Oblast. Its population is 2,516 people. Until 2020, the local government body was the Kosivshchyna village council.

== Geography ==
The village of Kosivshchyna is located on the right bank of the Sumka river at the confluence of the Sukhonosivka river, upstream at a distance of 1.5 km is the village of Kononenkove, downstream at a distance of 2 km is the city of Sumy. On the Sumka river there is a dam that forms the Kosivshchyna reservoir.

== History ==
Kosivshchyna was known as the Kosivtsovshchyna village already in the 1750s and arose on lands purchased by the clerk of the Sumy Regiment, Roman Kosivtsov. As of 1779, the farm had 28 male souls. In 1783, it was included in the General Plan of Sumy County. In 1864, the farm had 15 households and over 80 residents.

In the early years (approximately from the end of the 1800s), the village was divided into the Velyka and Mala Kosivshchyna villages. In those years, the division was rather conditional. The Small Kosivshchyna was called the farm located at the mouth of the Ilma River (now Lesya Ukrainka Street), the Big Kosivshchyna was located slightly upstream of the Sumka River. Officially, the division took place only in the 1940s, but then, together with the village of Dibrova (Sukhonosovsky village, the manor of the landowner Sukhonis) in the mid-1960s, as a result of the resettlement of part of the inhabitants during the creation of the Kosivshchyna Reservoir, they were united into one village — Kosivshchyna.

In the spring of 1889, the poet Lesya Ukrainka was being treated by the folk healer Paraska Bogush in Kosivshchyna (then Mala Kosivshchyna). The house in which she lived has not been preserved. During her stay, the farm was managed by the landowner Sukhonis. Now a street, a school and a bust in the center of the village are named after the poetess. On the basis of the Kosivshchynska Secondary School in 1971, a museum was created to commemorate the 100th anniversary of Lesya Ukrainka's birth.

In 1999, a teacher at a local art school, a master of decorative and applied arts, and a local historian, Oleksandr Ivanovych Kiselyov, based on his own collection, founded the Museum of Folk Crafts and Life of Slobozhanshchyna at the Kosivshchyna School of Arts, which in 2008 received the title of "folk".

On June 12, 2020, in accordance with the Order of the Cabinet of Ministers of Ukraine No. 723-p "On the Determination of Administrative Centers and Approval of Territories of Territorial Communities of Sumy Region", the village became part of the Stepanivska Settlement Community.

On July 19, 2020, as a result of the administrative-territorial reform and liquidation of Sumy district (1923–2020), it became part of the newly formed Sumy district.

=== Russian invasion of Ukraine ===
At the beginning of the war, the Kosivshchyna was occupied by the Russian army.

On the night of March 6, 2025, a Russian UAV hit a cemetery in the village of Kosivshchyna. There is damage to the tombstones.

On the night of April 17, a Russian "Shahed" hit a private home in the village of Kosivshchyna. There were no fatalities or injuries. Eight households are known to have been damaged.

== Famous people ==
The following were born in the village:

- Bondarenko Pavlo Mykhailovych — Ukrainian military man, participant in the Russian-Ukrainian War.
- Vakal Vladyslav Volodymyrovych — Ukrainian military man, participant in the Russian-Ukrainian War.
- Krykunenko Vitaliy Grigorovich (b. {{{1}}} 1951) — Ukrainian poet, translator, literary critic.

== Economy ==
The main enterprise of the village is AVIS-Ukraine, which specializes in the production of eggs.

== Sources ==
Живий зв'язок поколінь [село Косівщина] // Мій край Слобожанський : зб. історико-краєзнавчих матеріалів. — Kyiv : ВД «Фолігрант», 2006. — P. 228—234 : фот. — (Сер. «Малі міста — велика слава»). — ISBN 966-96530-2-9.

Музей народних ремесел та побуту Слобожанщини // Музеї України. — 2008. — No. 1. — P. 16–17.
