= Stare Selo, Sumy Oblast =

Urban locality in Sumy Oblast, Ukraine

Stare Selo Старе Село
- Village
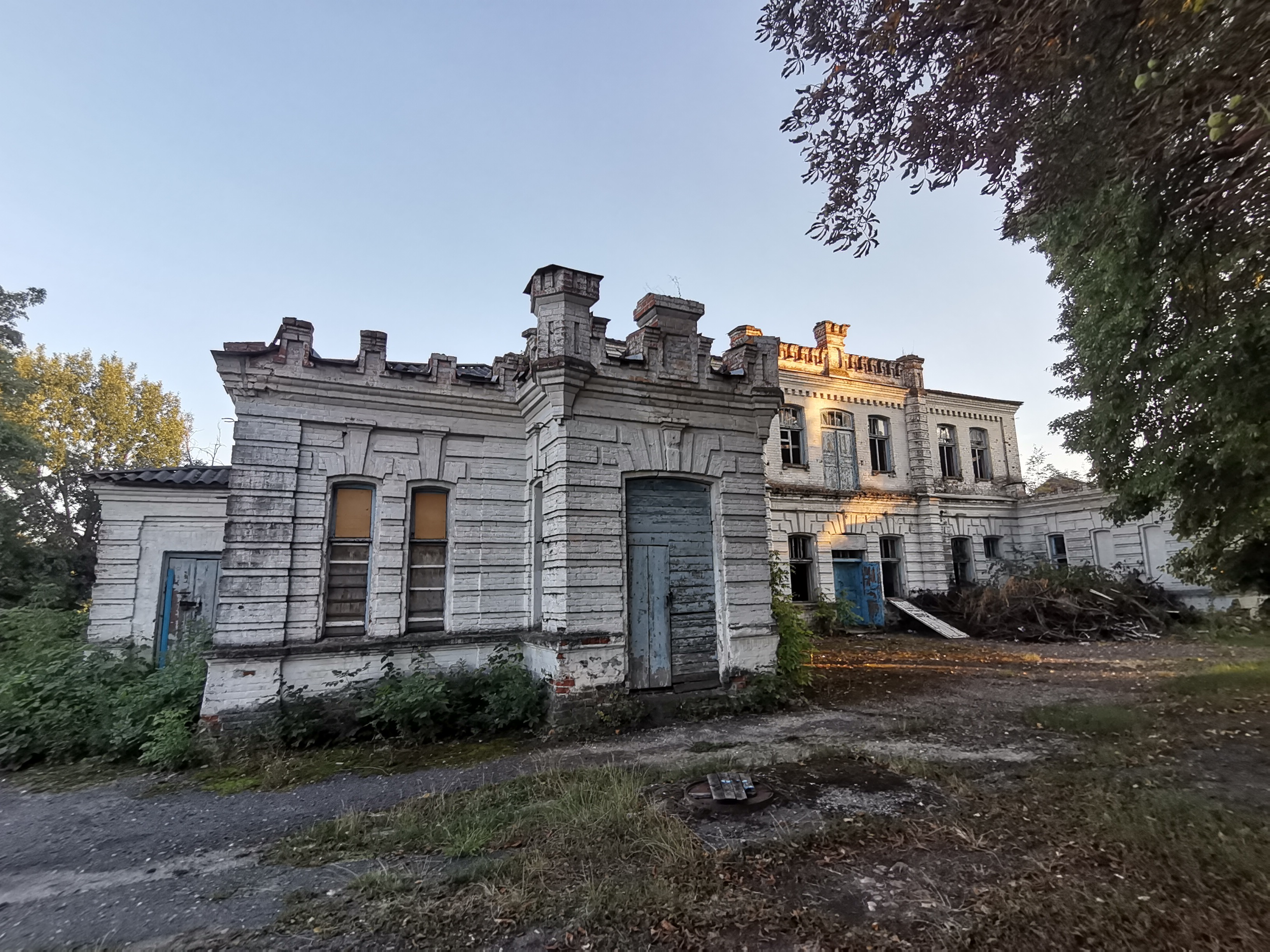
- Zboromyrski Palace
- Interactive map of Stare Selo
- Coordinates: 50°55′N 34°45′E
- Country: Ukraine
- Oblast: Sumy Oblast
- Raion: Sumy Raion
- Hromada: Nyzhnia Syrovatka rural hromada
- Established: 1642

Government
  - Type: Village council
- Elevation: 133 m (436 ft)

Population
  - Total: 2,079
- Postal code: 42353
- Area code: +380 542

Stare Selo (Ukrainian: Старе Село, lit. 'Old Village') until 2016 Chervone (Ukrainian: Червоне), or simply Stare, is a village in Ukraine, in Sumy Raion, Sumy Oblast. It is the seat of its local self-governing body, the Stare Selo Village Council.

== Location ==
The village of Stare is located on the right bank of the Psel River, 9 km south of central Sumy. Above the village at a distance of 1 km is the village of Barvinkove, below the village at a distance of 2 km is the village of Vyshneve. The Psel in this place is winding, forms swamps, and marshes. Nearby is highway H12.

== History ==
- Founded in 1642 as Stare Selo.
- In the 19th century, the village of Stare Selo was in Sumy Volost, Sumy Uyezd, Kharkov Governorate. The St. Nicholas Church was built in the village.
- In 1930 it was renamed to Chervone (lit. 'Red') by the Communists.
- In 2016 it was given back its original name, Stare Selo.

== Transport ==
Stare has two bus stops: one at the highway and Sumska Street, and another on Pershotravneva Street and Sumska Street. Marshrutkas from Sumy and other villages run to and by the village frequently.
