= Bezdryk =

Village in Sumy Oblast, Ukraine

Bezdryk Бездрик
- Village
- Location of Bezdryk in Sumy Oblast Location of Bezdryk in Ukraine
- Coordinates: 50°51′54″N 34°57′19″E
- Country: Ukraine
- Oblast: Sumy Oblast
- Raion: Sumy Raion
- Hromada: Bezdryk rural hromada
- First mentioned: 1677

Population
  - Total: 1,692

Bezdryk (Ukrainian: Бездрик) is a village in Sumy Raion, Sumy Oblast, in central Ukraine. It is the capital of Bezdryk rural hromada, one of the hromadas of Ukraine, and has a population of 1,692 (as of 2001).

== History ==
Bezdryk was first mentioned in 1677. Prior to the Russian Revolution it was renowned for the number and quality of icons in the local Church of the Archangel Michael, dating to the time of the Cossack Hetmanate, and an archaeological expedition of the Russian Orthodox Church took place in 1916.

Farmers in Bezdryk went on strike during the Russian Revolution of 1905. The village was occupied by the Red Army in December 1917 amidst the Ukrainian–Soviet War. 259 of the village's residents fought for the Red Army in World War II, of whom 88 were killed in battle.

== Demographics ==
According to the 2001 Ukrainian census 91.95% of Bezdryk's population natively speaks Ukrainian. Of the remainder, 7.64% reported being native speakers of Russian and 0.41% said that Belarusian was their native language. The census also reported that Bezdryk has a population of 1,692.

== Notable people ==
- Mykola Alfyorov, architect, engraver, painter, and writer.
- Valentyn Nedryhailo, People's Deputy of Ukraine.
