= Verkhnia Syrovatka =

Village in Sumy Oblast, Ukraine

Verkhnia Syrovatka Верхня Сироватка
- Village
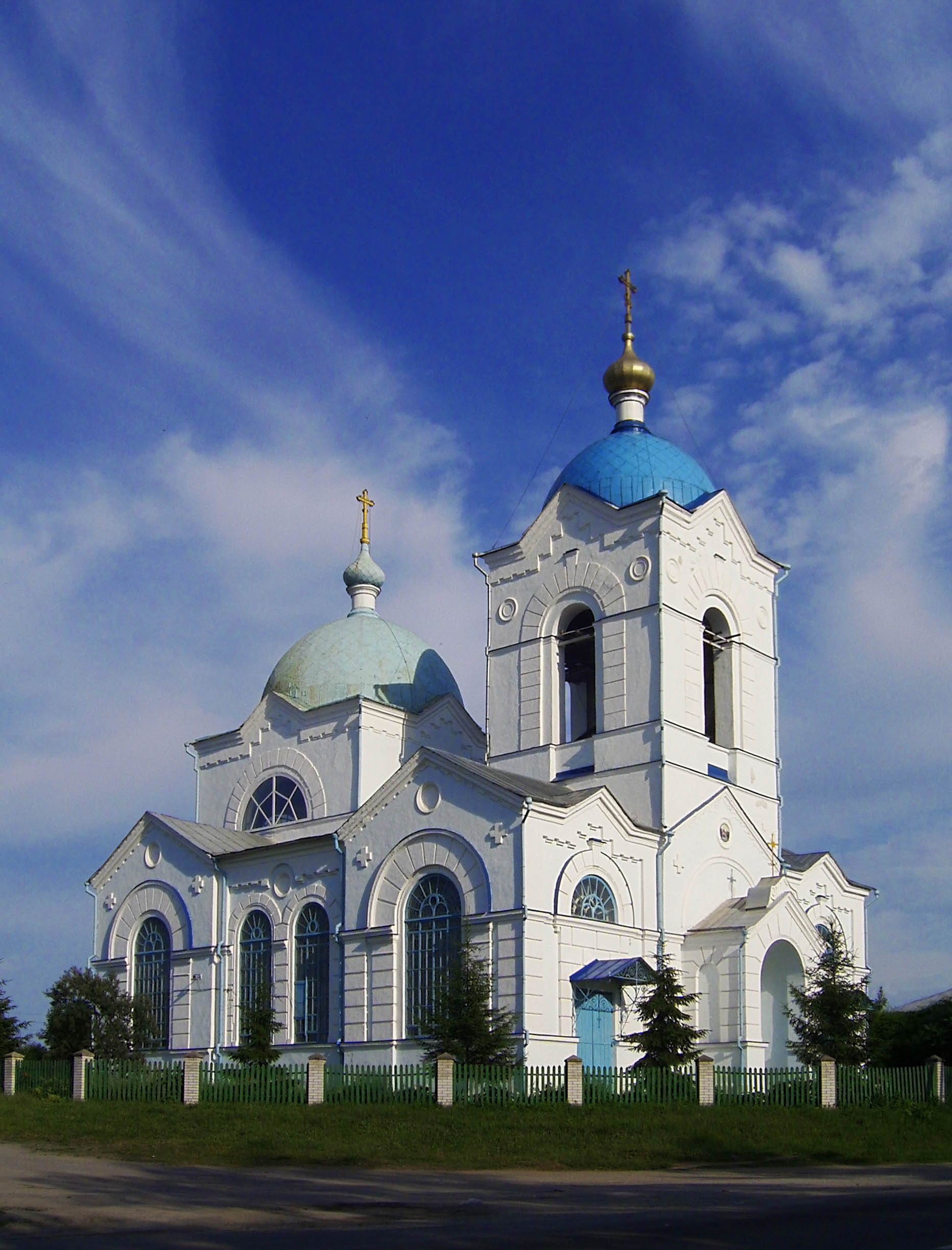
- The Church of the Holy Dormition in Verkhnia Syrovatka

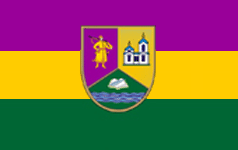
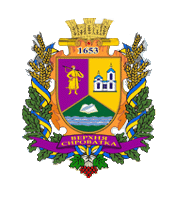
- Flag Coat of arms

- Location of Verkhnia Syrovatka in Sumy Oblast Location of Verkhnia Syrovatka in Ukraine
- Coordinates: 50°49′41″N 34°57′15″E
- Country: Ukraine
- Oblast: Sumy Oblast
- Raion: Sumy Raion
- Hromada: Verkhnia Syrovatka rural hromada
- First mentioned: 1653

Population
  - Total: 3,814

Verkhnia Syrovatka (Note: (Ukrainian: Верхня Сироватка, Russian: Верхняя Сыроватка, also Верхняя Сывороткa)) is a village in Sumy Raion, Sumy Oblast, in central Ukraine. It is the administrative centre of Verkhnia Syrovatka rural hromada, one of the hromadas of Ukraine. Its population is 3,814 (as of 2024).

== Overview ==
Verkhnia Syrovatka was first mentioned in 1653. It came under the occupation of the Red Army in December 1917, amidst the Ukrainian–Soviet War. 765 residents fought for the Soviet Union during World War II, and the Red Army recaptured the village during the 1943 Battle of the Dnieper after it had been previously occupied by Nazi Germany.

Verkhnia Syrovatka was repeatedly shelled by Russian forces during the Russian invasion of Ukraine.

A group of ten Ukrainian soldiers ambushed a Russian convoy near the village of Verkhnia Syrovatka on 1 March 2022. Five of the Ukrainians were killed, and more than ten Russian vehicles were reportedly destroyed. A monument now stands at the place of the ambush. The village was shelled by Russian forces for the first time on 14 March 2022.

One notable landmark in Verkhnia Syrovatka is the Church of the Dormition, constructed by cultural figure Oleksandr Palytsyn in 1805. It was closed by Soviet authorities and used as an observation tower during World War II before being restored in the 1990s.

== Notable people ==
- Semen Krasii, Hero of the Soviet Union.
- Valentyn Parkhomenko, film director and actor.
