= Sumy =

City and administrative center of Sumy Oblast, Ukraine

Sumy Суми
- City
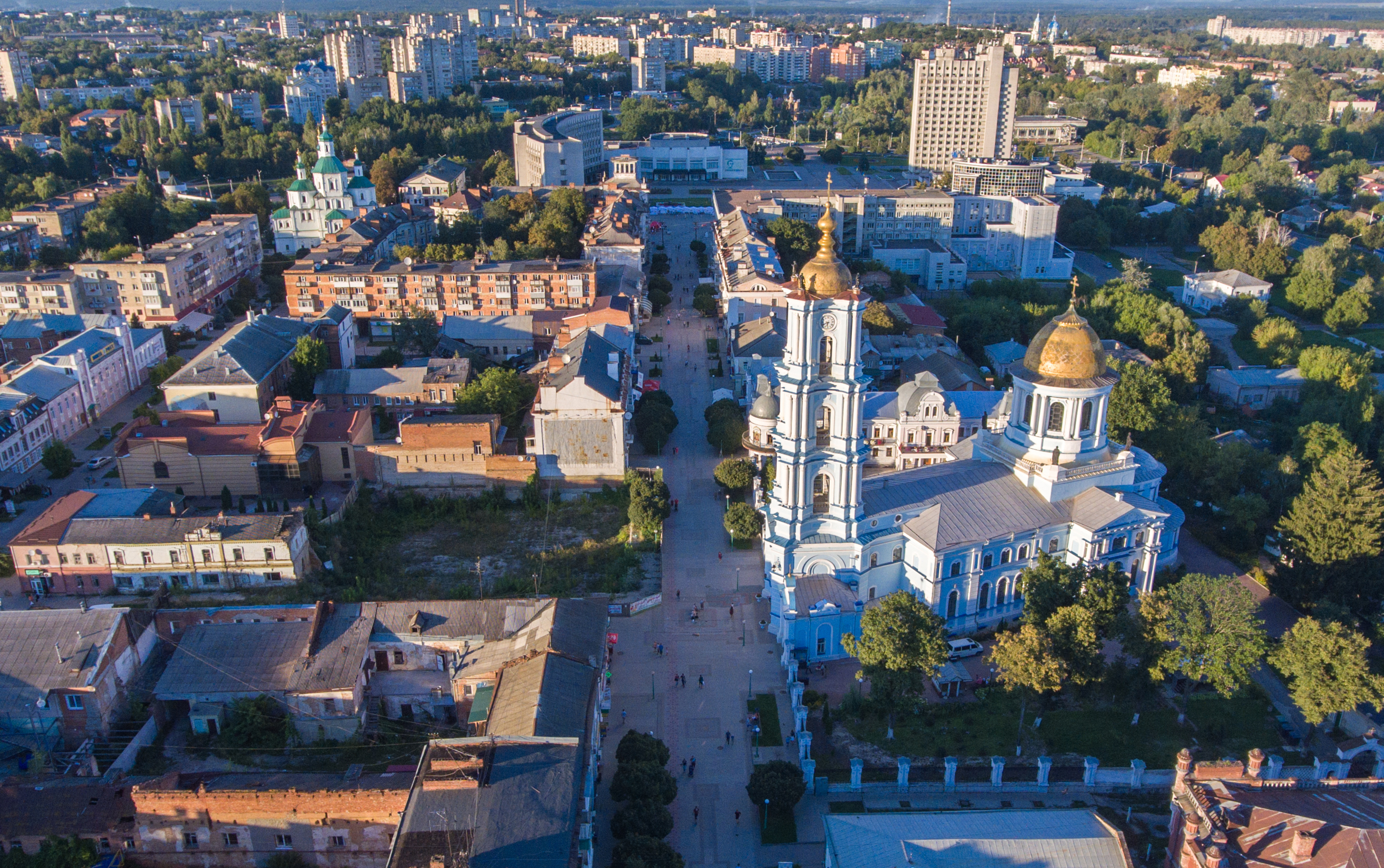
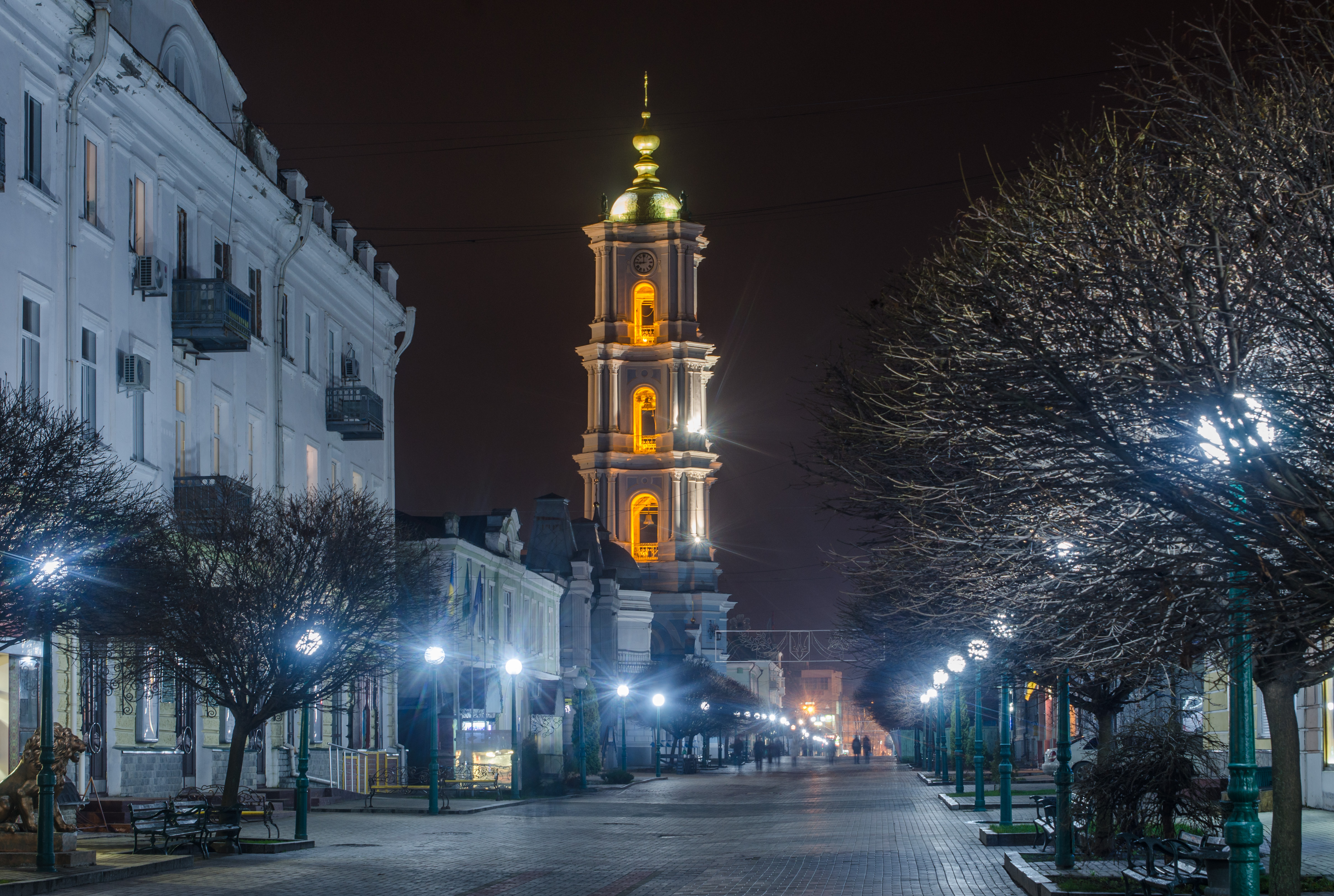
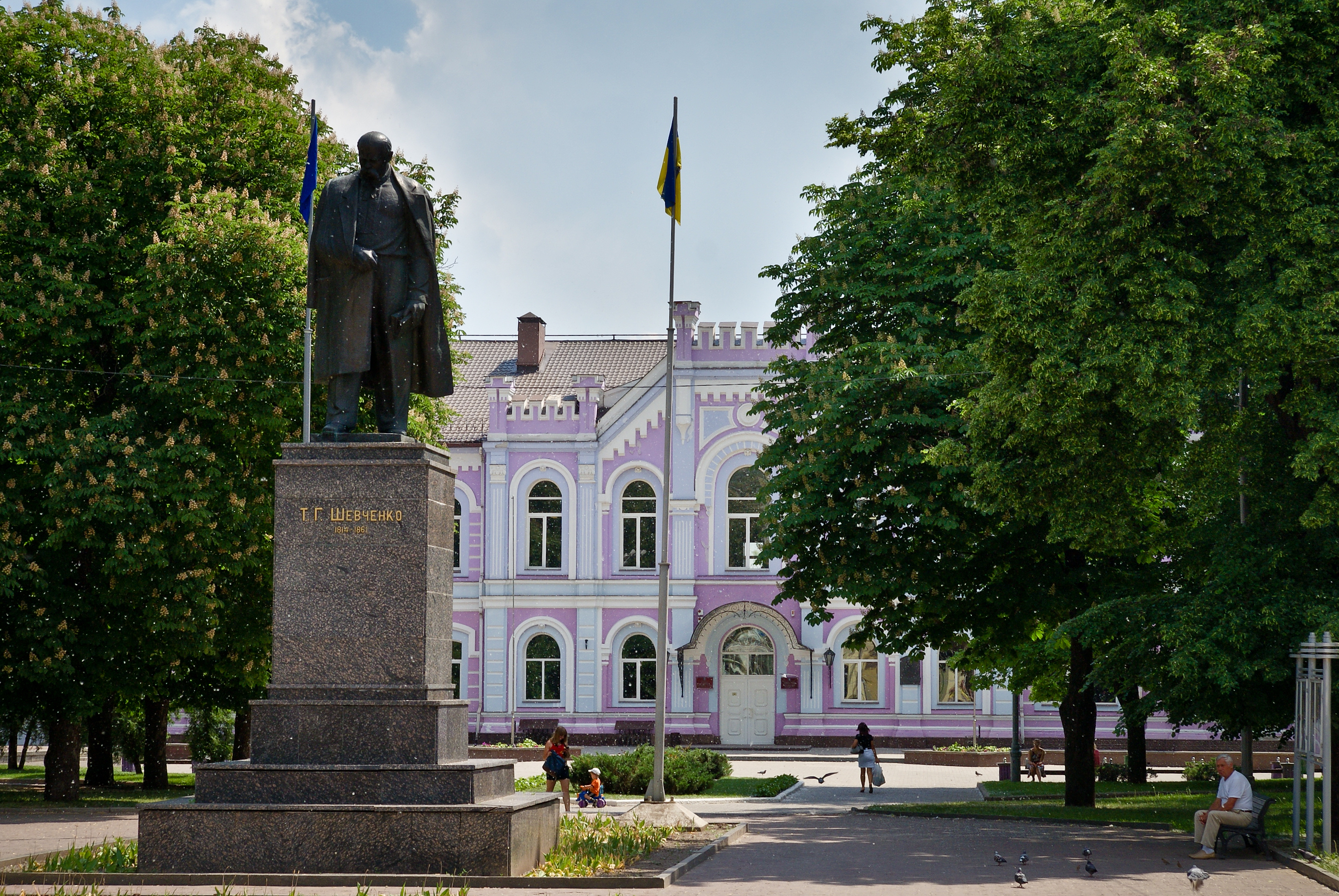
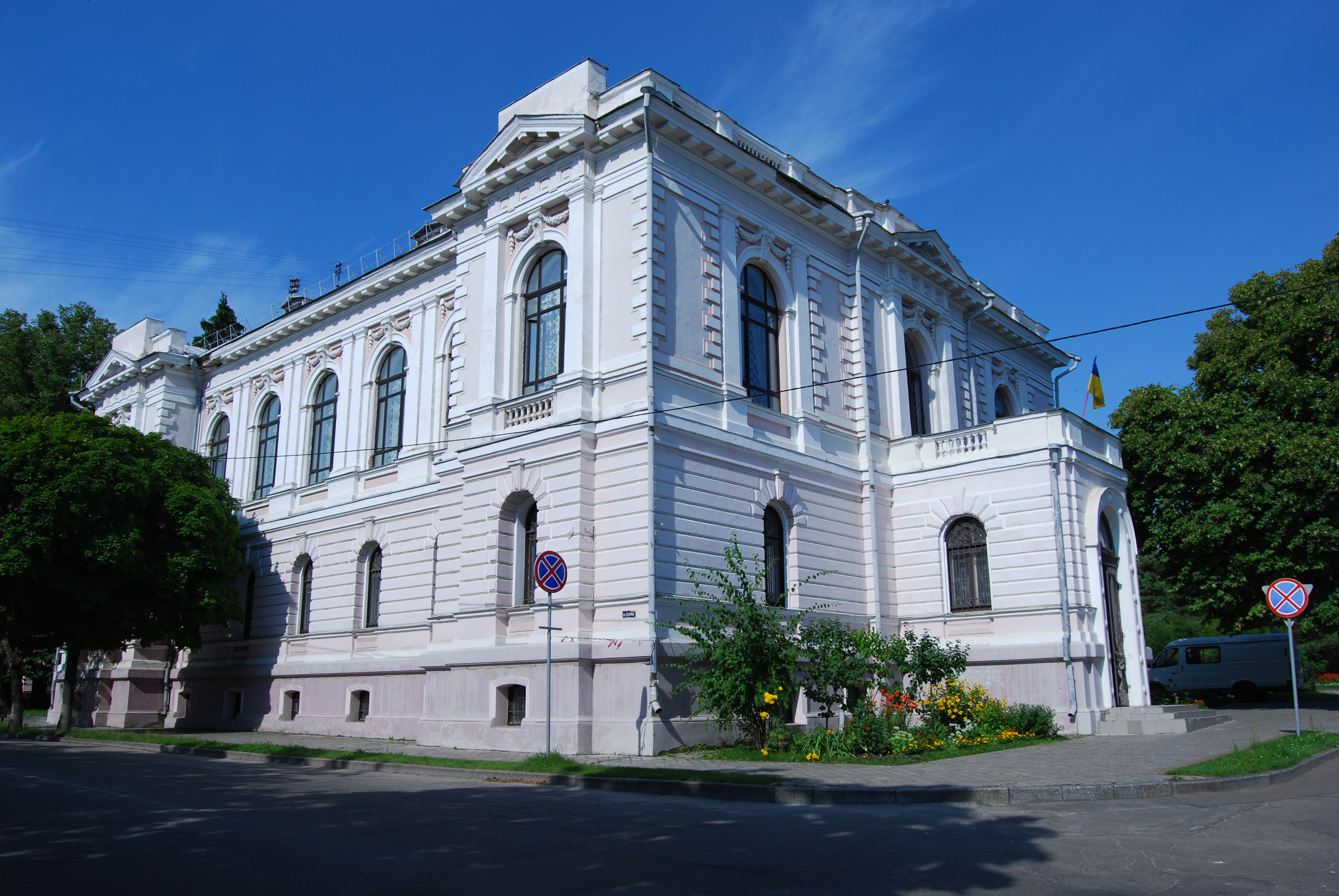
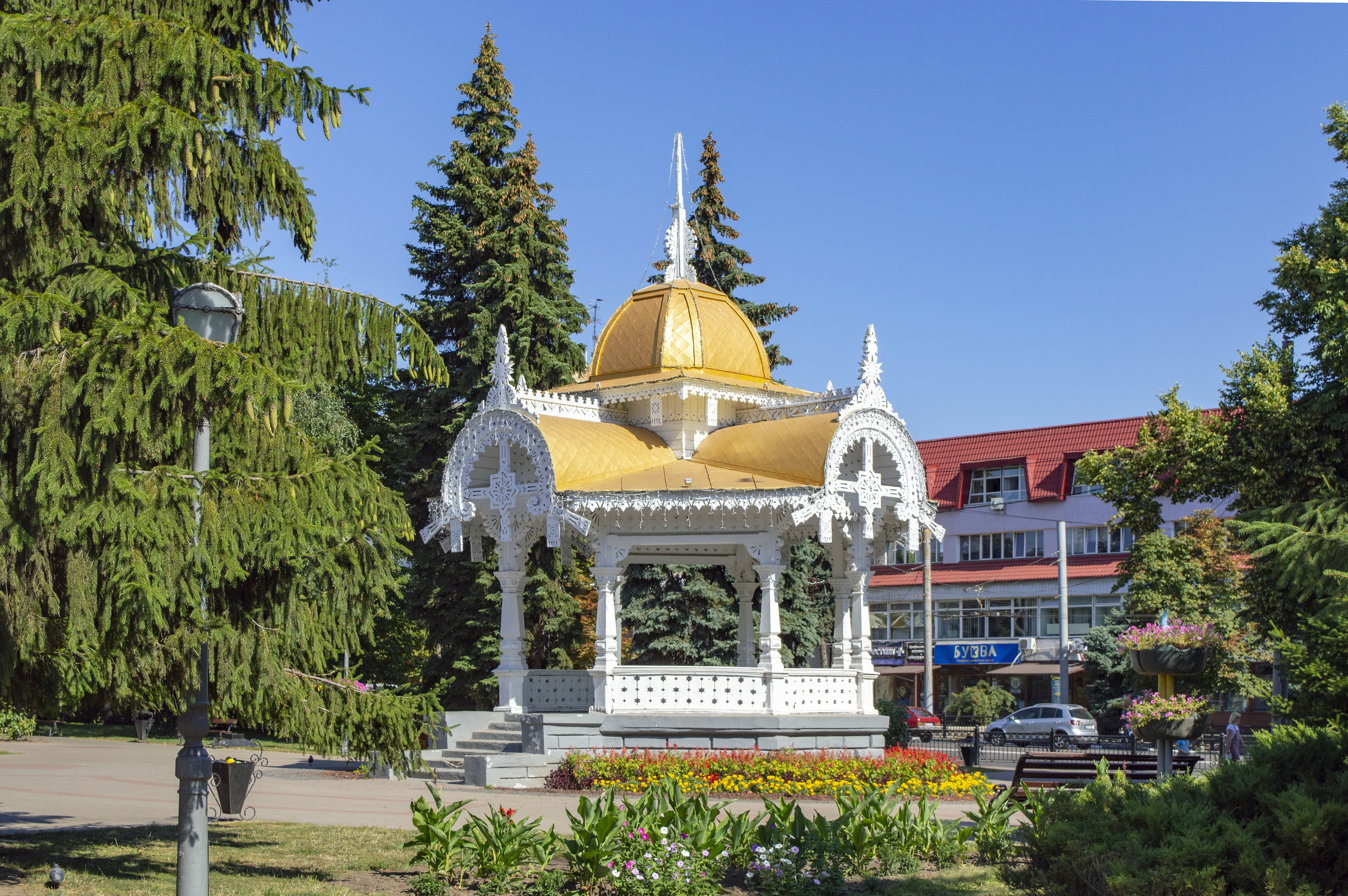
- Aerial view of Sumy Soborna Street Taras Shevchenko monument State Art Museum Gazebo

- Flag Coat of arms
- Anthem: Anthem of Sumy
- Interactive map of Sumy
- Location within Sumy Oblast Location within Ukraine
- Coordinates: 50°54′43″N 34°48′10″E
- Country: Ukraine
- Oblast: Sumy Oblast
- Raion: Sumy Raion
- Hromada: Sumy urban hromada
- Founded: 1655

Government
  - Mayor: Artem Kobzar (acting)

Area
  - Total: 145 km^{2} (56 sq mi)

Population (2022)
  - Total: 256,474
  - Density: 1,770/km^{2} (4,580/sq mi)
- Time zone: UTC+2 (CET)
  - Summer (DST): UTC+3 (CEST)
- Postal code: 40000-40035
- Area code: +380 542
- Website: https://smr.gov.ua/uk/

Sumy (Ukrainian: Суми, IPA: [ˈsumɪ]) is a city in northeastern Ukraine. It serves as the administrative center of Sumy Oblast. The city is situated on the banks of the Psel River and has a population of 256,474 (2022 estimate), making it the 23rd-largest in the country.

The city of Sumy was founded in the 1650s by Cossacks within the historical region of Sloboda Ukraine. The city experienced rapid development starting from the second half of the 19th century and became a centre of sugar, machine building, metalworking, and textile industry, as well as an important trade fair location. Today, Sumy is one of the chief industrial and cultural centres in Northern Ukraine.

== History ==
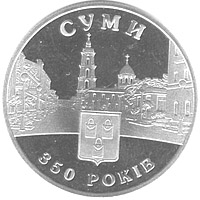
Commemorative coin from 2005 of Sumy's 350-year history

Sumy was founded by the Cossack Herasym Kondratyev from Stavyshche, Bila Tserkva Regiment on the banks of the Psel River, a tributary of the Dnieper. Whether it was founded in 1652 or 1655 remains a subject of discussion. In 1656–1658, at the site of the early Sumy settlement, under the leadership of the Muscovite voivode K. Arsenyev, a city fort was built, consisting of a fort and a grad (town).

In the 1670s, Sumy was expanded with the addition of a fortified posad (craftsman town), after which it became the biggest fortress in Sloboda Ukraine. From 1658 onwards, Sumy was the center of the Sumy Cossack Regiment (military unit and local administrative division). In the 1680s, unfortified suburbs began to develop around the city.

At the end of the 17th century, Sumy played a role as a collection point for Muscovite troops during the Crimean campaigns of 1687 and 1689. During the Great Northern War, from December 1708 to January 1709, the city was the stavka (headquarters) of the Muscovite Chief of Commander headed by Tsar Peter the Great. Established under the leadership of Prince A. Shakhovskoy, the commission on streamlining the Sloboda Cossack regiments was located in 1734–1743 in Sumy. From its establishment and until the liquidation of Cossackdom in Sloboda Ukraine in 1765, the Cossack officer family of Kondratyevs exercised great influence over the city.

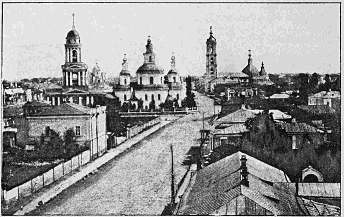
Central Sumy in 1897

Following the liquidation of the Cossack community in 1765, the Sumy Cossack Regiment as an administrative division was turned into Sumy Province of the newly created Sloboda Ukraine Governorate and the city of Sumy became its center. In 1780, Sumy was turned into a centre of Sumy uyezd. In 1786–1789, the city was reformed by removing its city walls.

After a period of stagnation (1765–1860s), Sumy began to transform into a big industrial and trade center with Paul's Sugar-Refining Factory (est. 1869 by I. Kharytonenko) and the Sumy Engineering Workshops (est. 1896, producing equipment for sugar refineries). With the construction of a railroad Vorozhba – Merefa, the Sumy train station was built in the city in January 1877. Various families of philanthropist industrialists, the most famous of which were the Kharytonenkos, contributed greatly to the development of Sumy.

During the Russian Revolution of 1905, Sumy was one of several areas which became famous throughout Russia for having established an independent peasant republic. The Sumy Republic was established by a peasant union.

=== World War II ===
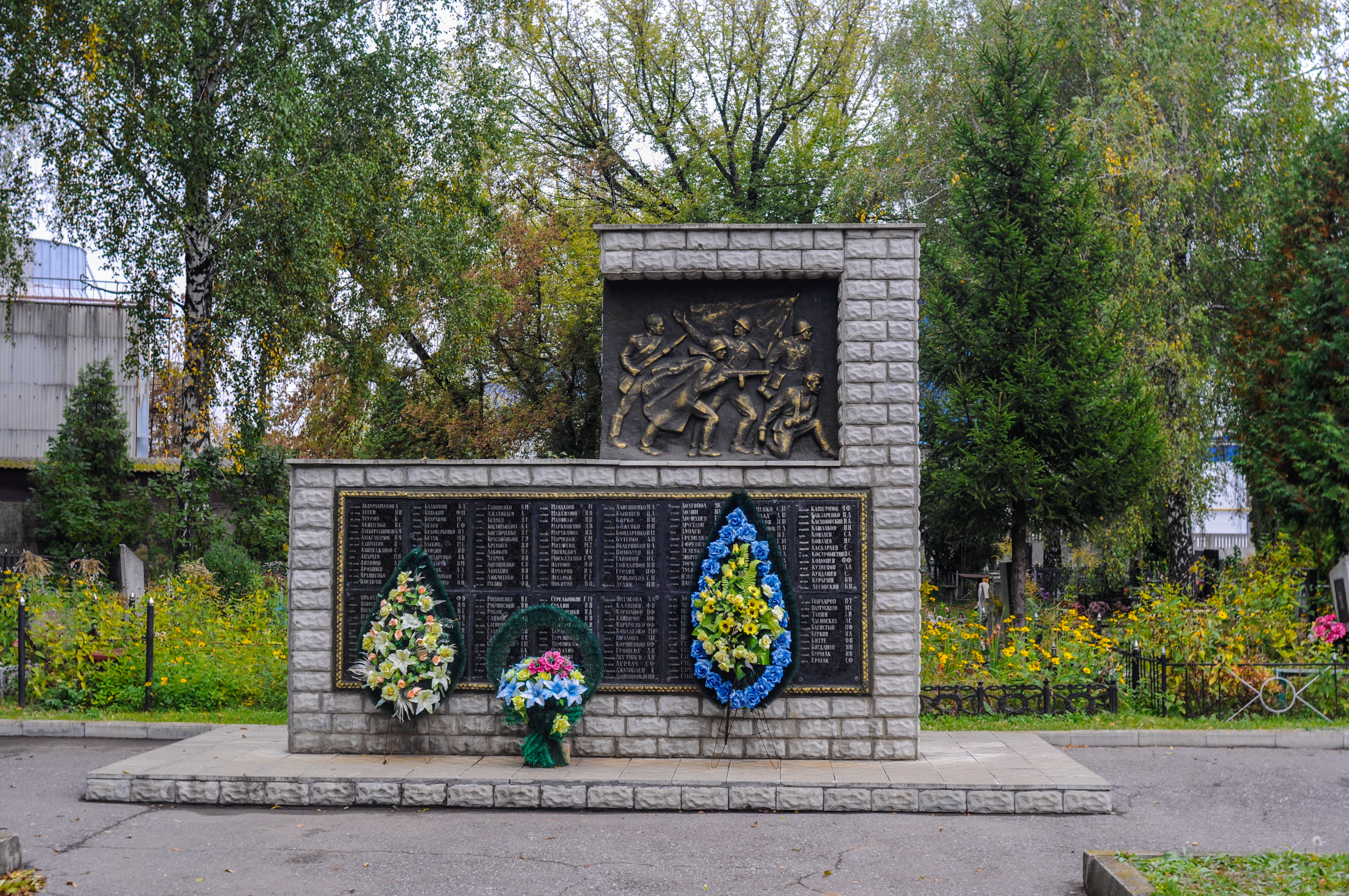
Mass grave of soldiers fallen in World War II

During the German occupation of Ukraine during World War II (1941–1944), Sumy sustained heavy damage and was occupied from 10 October 1941 to 2 September 1943. In February 1942, some 1,000 Jews were murdered in Sumy in two large-scale operations. In May–June that year, the Germans and their Hungarian allies killed an additional several dozen Jews, along with thirty Roma. Some 250 Hungarian Jews were also murdered in Sumy during the occupation period. The Germans operated a Nazi prison, a forced labour battalion for Jews and Stalag 308 prisoner-of-war camp in the city.

In January 1944, the 1st Reserve Infantry Regiment of the 1st Corps of the Polish Armed Forces was stationed in Sumy, and soon the Main Formation Staff of the First Polish Army was established in Sumy. In 1944, about 30,000 Polish soldiers were stationed and underwent military training in Sumy before rejoining the fight against Nazi Germany.

After the war, the destroyed parts of the city were rebuilt.

=== Slobozhanshchyna (UPR) ===
Slobozhanshchyna
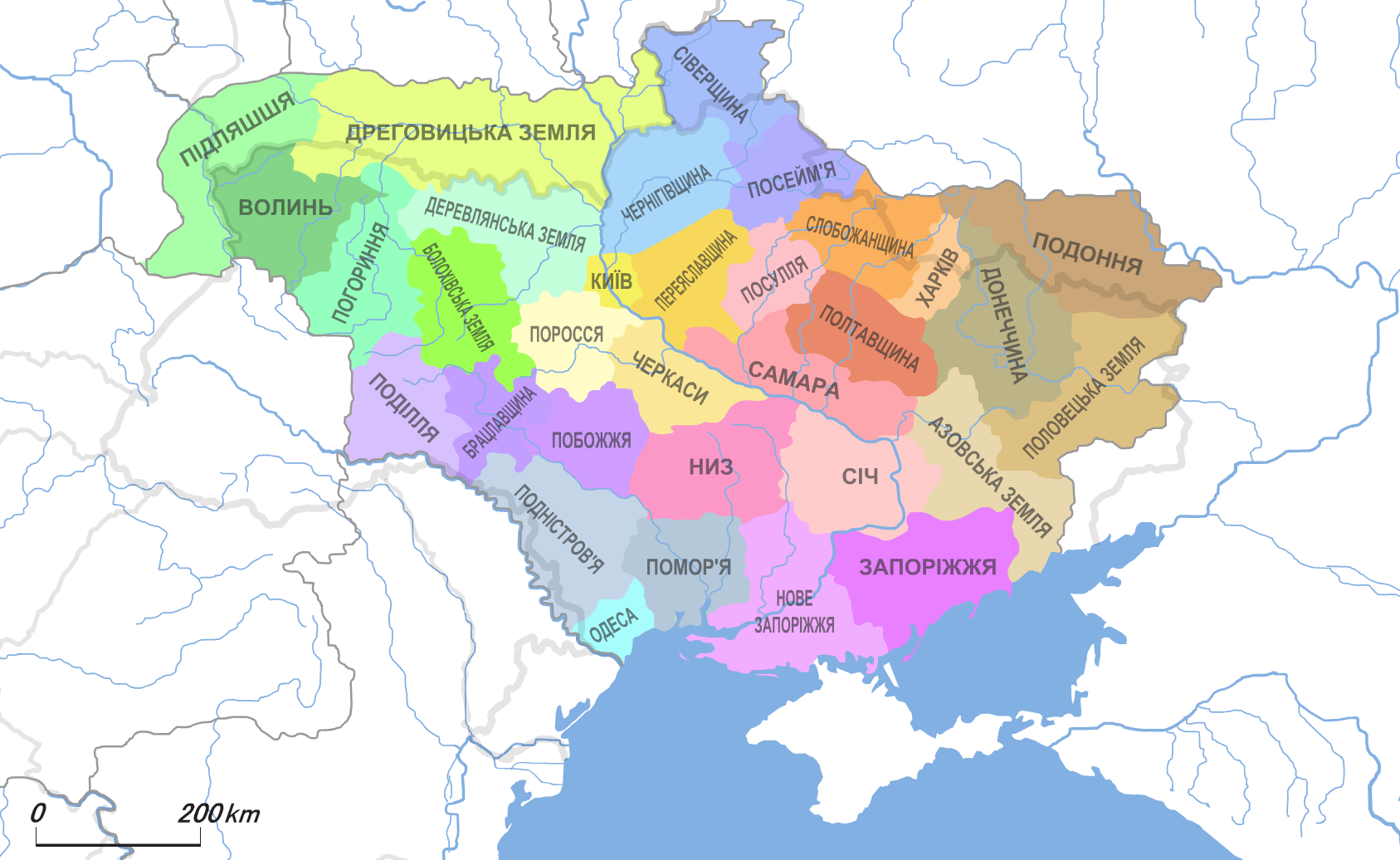
- Slobozhanshchyna on the map
- Capital: Sumy
- Founded: 6 March 1918
- Abolished: 29 April 1918

Slobozhanshchyna was a zemlia of the Ukrainian People's Republic centered in Sumy. Founded on 6 May 1918 according to the Law "On the administrative-territorial division of Ukraine" approved by the Central Council of Ukraine, it was disbanded on 29 April 1918 by Hetman of Ukraine Pavlo Skoropadsky, who brought back old governorate divisions of the Russian Empire.

The administrative unit included Sumy, Lebedyn, Sudzha, Hraivoron, parts of Okhtyrka and Bohodukhiv povits of Kursk and Kharkov governorates.

=== Russian invasion ===
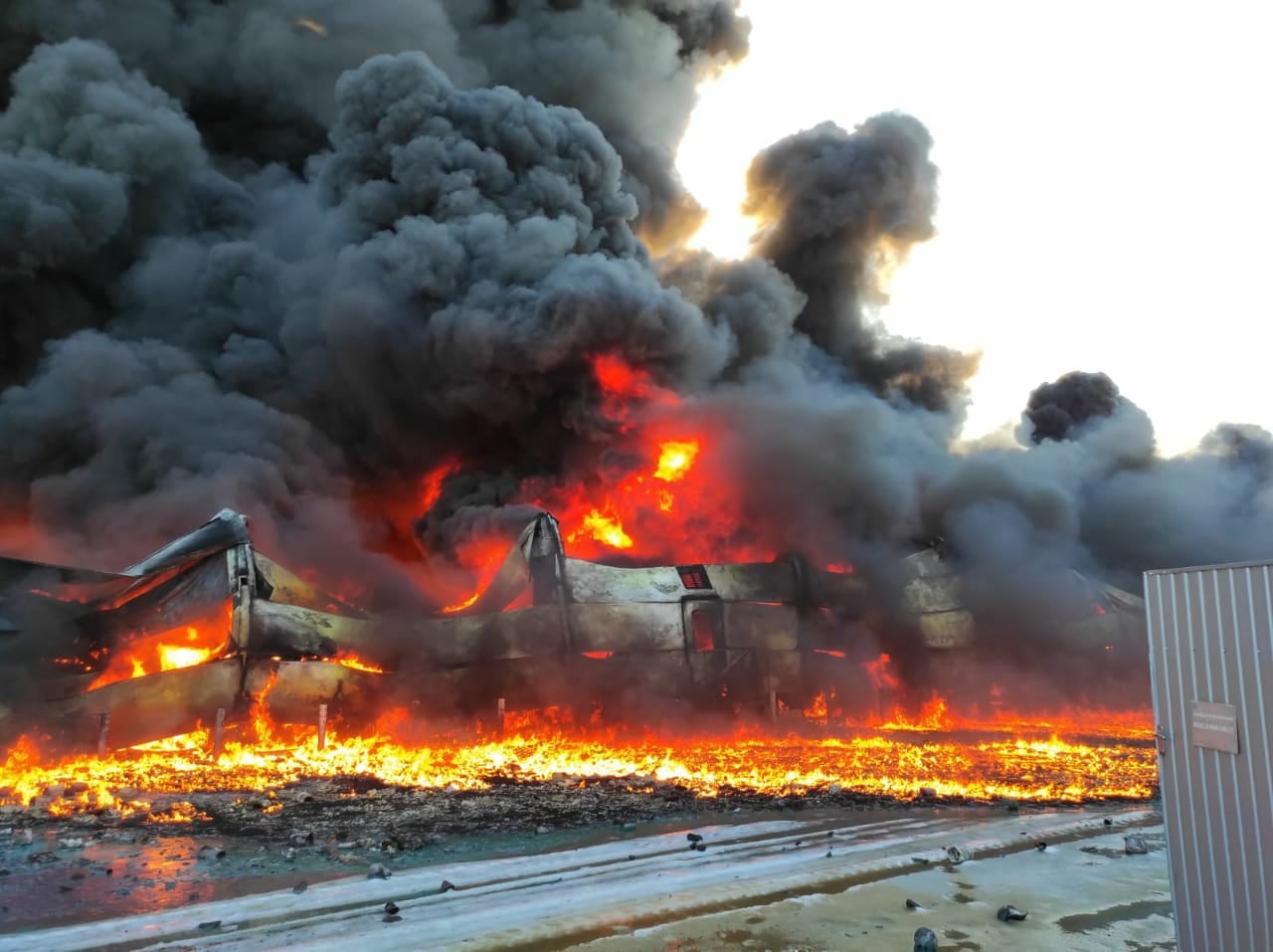
Storage building in Sumy after Russian shelling, 18 March 2022

On 24 February 2022, the first day of the Russian invasion of Ukraine, Sumy came under attack by Russian forces.

On 4 April 2022, Governor of Sumy Oblast Dmytro Zhyvytskyi stated that Russian troops no longer occupied any towns or villages in Sumy Oblast and had mostly withdrawn, while Ukrainian troops were working to push out the remaining units. On 8 April, Governor Zhyvytskyi stated that all Russian troops had left Sumy Oblast, while adding that the territory of the region was still unsafe due to rigged explosives and other ammunition left behind by Russian troops. On 19 February 2025, Russia launched the Sumy Incursion against the city in hopes of capturing it but the Russian offensive stalled after four months and since then the offensive is inconclusive as of 26 June 2025, as Russian forces captured a bunch of small towns but failed to capture the city of Sumy itself. On 13 April 2025, Russia launched a missile strike against Sumy that killed at least 36 people. On 3 June 2025, Russia shelled the city, and there were reports of many thousands of Russian troops massing in the area.

== Geography ==
Sumy is located in the northeastern part of Ukraine within the Central Russian Upland and in the historical region of Sloboda Ukraine. It is located on the banks of the Psel River.

=== Climate ===
Due to its relatively close location, the city's weather is similar to that of Kharkiv. Sumy's climate is a warm-summer humid continental (Köppen: Dfb) with cold and snowy winters, and hot summers. The seasonal average temperatures are not too cold in winter, not too hot in summer: −6.9 °C (19.6 °F) in January, and 20.3 °C (68.5 °F) in July. The average rainfall totals 513 mm (20 in) per year, with the most in June and July.

Trends suggest an increase in the fall in precipitation in the coming decades.

Climate data for Sumy, Ukraine (1991–2020, extremes 1949-2011)
Month	Jan	Feb	Mar	Apr	May	Jun	Jul	Aug	Sep	Oct	Nov	Dec	Year
Record high °C (°F)	11.0 (51.8)	13.5 (56.3)	21.0 (69.8)	30.0 (86.0)	33.6 (92.5)	36.1 (97.0)	38.0 (100.4)	39.4 (102.9)	31.1 (88.0)	27.9 (82.2)	22.8 (73.0)	11.5 (52.7)	39.4 (102.9)
Mean daily maximum °C (°F)	−2.6 (27.3)	−1.3 (29.7)	4.5 (40.1)	14.3 (57.7)	21.0 (69.8)	24.5 (76.1)	26.5 (79.7)	25.9 (78.6)	19.5 (67.1)	11.9 (53.4)	3.7 (38.7)	−1.2 (29.8)	12.2 (54.0)
Daily mean °C (°F)	−5.1 (22.8)	−4.5 (23.9)	0.5 (32.9)	8.8 (47.8)	15.0 (59.0)	18.7 (65.7)	20.6 (69.1)	19.6 (67.3)	13.8 (56.8)	7.3 (45.1)	1.0 (33.8)	−3.5 (25.7)	7.7 (45.9)
Mean daily minimum °C (°F)	−7.6 (18.3)	−7.3 (18.9)	−3.0 (26.6)	3.7 (38.7)	9.2 (48.6)	13.2 (55.8)	15.0 (59.0)	13.7 (56.7)	8.6 (47.5)	3.5 (38.3)	−1.4 (29.5)	−5.8 (21.6)	3.5 (38.3)
Record low °C (°F)	−34.2 (−29.6)	−32.8 (−27.0)	−27.8 (−18.0)	−11.1 (12.0)	−3.9 (25.0)	0.9 (33.6)	5.0 (41.0)	4.0 (39.2)	−4.3 (24.3)	−11.7 (10.9)	−22.9 (−9.2)	−29.5 (−21.1)	−34.2 (−29.6)
Average precipitation mm (inches)	39 (1.5)	33 (1.3)	39 (1.5)	35 (1.4)	61 (2.4)	58 (2.3)	73 (2.9)	42 (1.7)	48 (1.9)	48 (1.9)	39 (1.5)	41 (1.6)	556 (21.9)
Average precipitation days (≥ 1.0 mm)	8.7	8.1	8.4	6.9	8.8	8.0	8.1	5.6	6.6	7.7	7.0	9.2	93.1
Average snowy days	18	14	10	3	0	0	0	0	0	2	10	17	74
Average relative humidity (%)	86.5	84.0	77.8	65.9	64.4	67.4	70.1	66.8	73.1	79.8	86.7	87.9	75.9
Source 1: NOAA
Source 2: Climatebase.ru (extremes), Weatherbase (snow days)

== Government ==
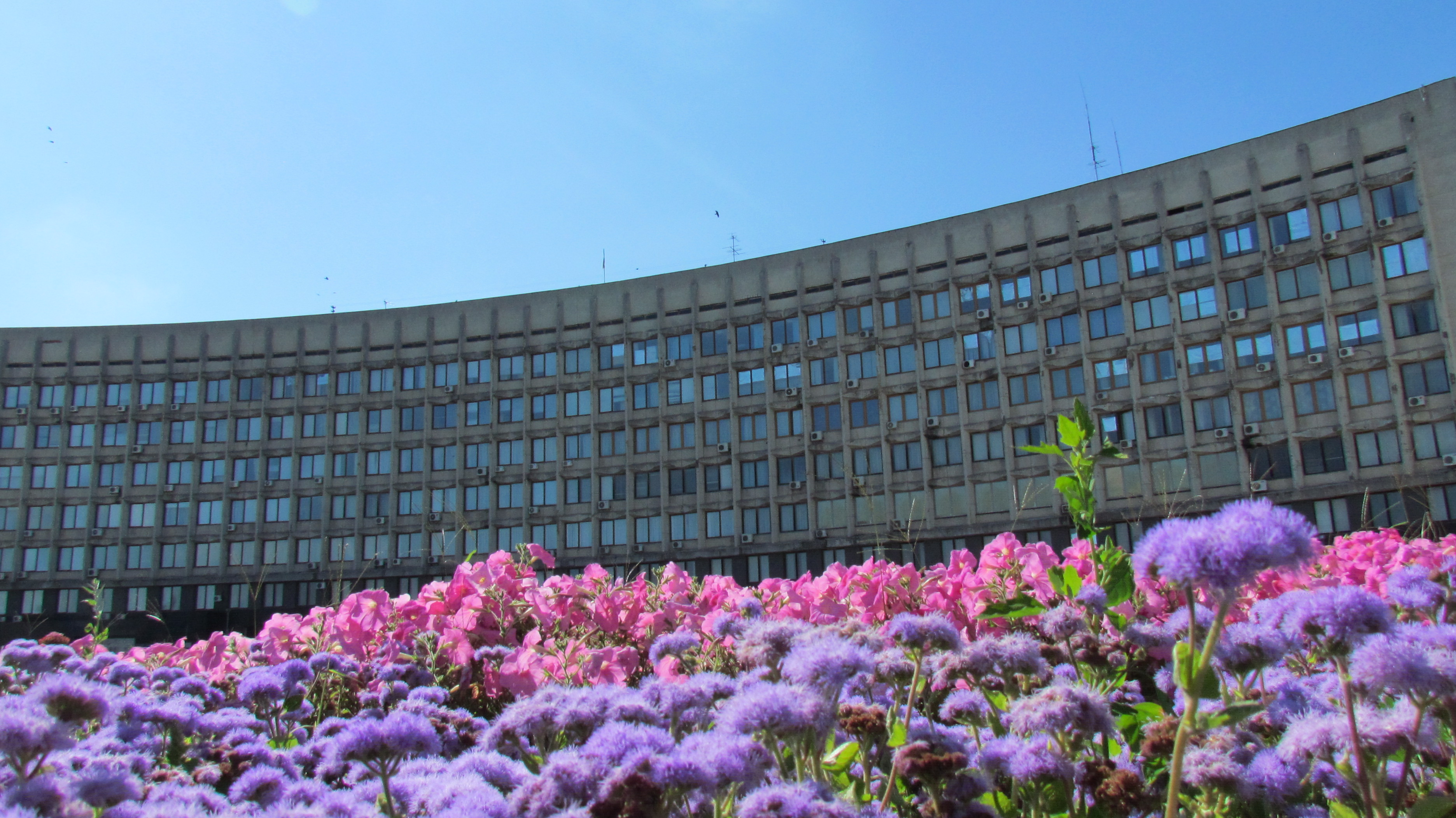
Sumy Oblast Administration building

Sumy is a city of oblast significance which makes a separate subdivision within the Sumy Oblast. Sumy is also an administrative center of Sumy Raion which surrounds the city.

The city used to be divided into two urban districts, Zarichnyi and Kovpakovskyi, and 13 microraions. Since 2006, the subdivision into urban districts is not in effect.

The city municipality also includes several adjacent villages including Verkhnie Pishchane, Zhyteiske, Zahirske, Kyryiakivshchyna, Pishchane, and Trokhymenkove.

== Demographics ==
Historical population
Year	Pop.	±%
1897	27,564	—
1926	43,814	+59.0%
1939	63,976	+46.0%
1959	98,015	+53.2%
1970	159,168	+62.4%
1979	228,174	+43.4%
1989	291,264	+27.6%
2001	293,141	+0.6%
2011	271,016	−7.5%
2022	256,474	−5.4%

- 1897 - 70.53% Ukrainians, 24.1% Russians, 2.6% Jewish, 2.67% others
- 1926 - 80.7% Ukrainians, 11.8% Russians, 5.5% Jewish, 2% others
- 1959 - 79% Ukrainians, 20% Russians, 1% others
- 2001 - 85% Ukrainians, 12% Russians, 3% others

The majority of residents are Christians (Eastern Orthodox, Roman Catholics, and Protestant or Evangelical Christians). There is also a Jewish minority.

From the beginning of the twentieth century, Sumy was the center of Roman Catholicism in northeastern Ukraine. The Blessed Virgin Mary Annunciation Church was established in the city in 1901 and consecrated in 1911, but closed by governmental authorities two decades later; the churchhouse was thereafter used for non-religious purposes (e.g., it was used as a gym for Oleksandrivska Gymnasia) until its restoration as a Roman Catholic parish in May 1994, after the disintegration of the Soviet Union. It was reconsecrated in the spring of 1998.

According to the census held in 1660, the population of Sumy was 2740 people. In 1732, it was 7,700 people, in 1773 — 9,380 people, in 1850 — 10,256 people, in 1898 — 26,355 people.

During Soviet times, the population grew significantly. In 1939, it reached 63.9 thousand people. In 1959, it was 98,015 people, 159 thousand people in 1970, 194 thousand people in 1975, 291,264 people in 1989, and 303.3 thousand people in 1991.

According to the Ukrainian Census of 2001, the population of Sumy was 292,139 people. By 1 January 2013, it had decreased to 269,177 people. On 13 May 2025, the population was 268,409 people.

=== Language ===
Distribution of the population by native language according to the 2001 census:

Language	Number	Percentage
Ukrainian	225 784	77.29%
Russian	59 461	20.35%
Other or undecided	6 894	2.36%
Total	292 139	100.00%

According to a survey conducted by the International Republican Institute in April–May 2023, 64% of the city's population spoke Ukrainian at home, and 27% spoke Russian.

== Economy and infrastructure ==
=== Enterprises ===
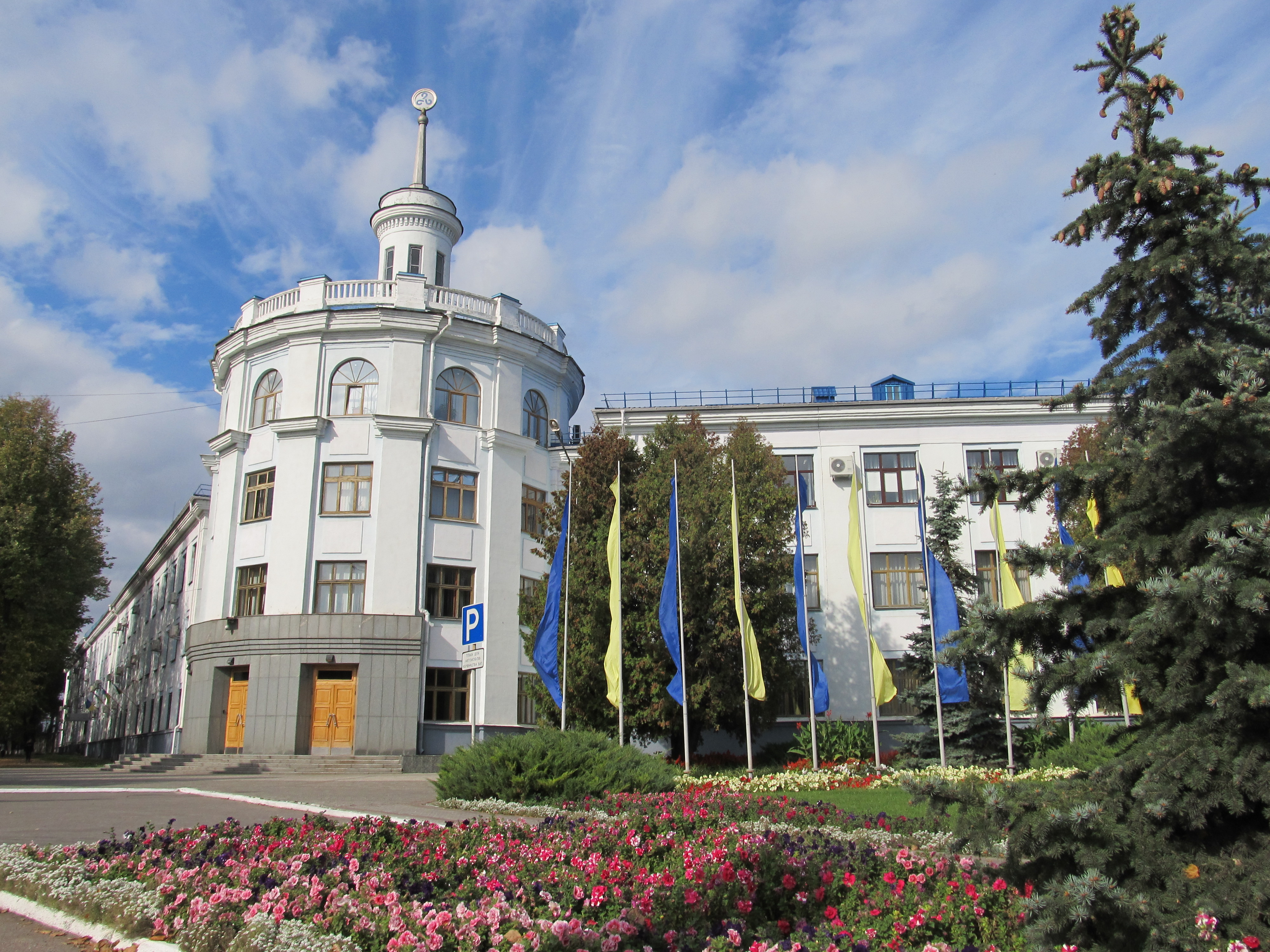
Building of Sumy Engineering Science and Production Association

- Sumy Engineering Science and Production Association (formerly Frunze factory)
- Sumykhimprom, a major chemical factory
  - Sumykhimprom chemical plant ammonia leak

=== Infrastructure ===
- There is a Sumy Airport in the city. Built in 1978, since 2006 it has been an international airport and received flights from outside Ukraine.
- There are several railway stations in the city, two of which serve passenger trains. All stations are part of the UZ regional branch Southern Railways. Sumy railway station also is the headquarters of one of four territorial subdivisions of the Southern Railways and conducts supervision over some other 45 stations in Sumy, Poltava, and Kharkiv oblasts.
- There are two major routes that cross the city H07 (Kyiv–Yunakivka at Russian border) and H12 (Sumy–Poltava). There are also a few regional routes P44 (Sumy–Hlukhiv), P45 (Sumy–Bohodukhiv), and P61 (Sumy–Baturyn).

== Main sights ==
=== Landmarks ===
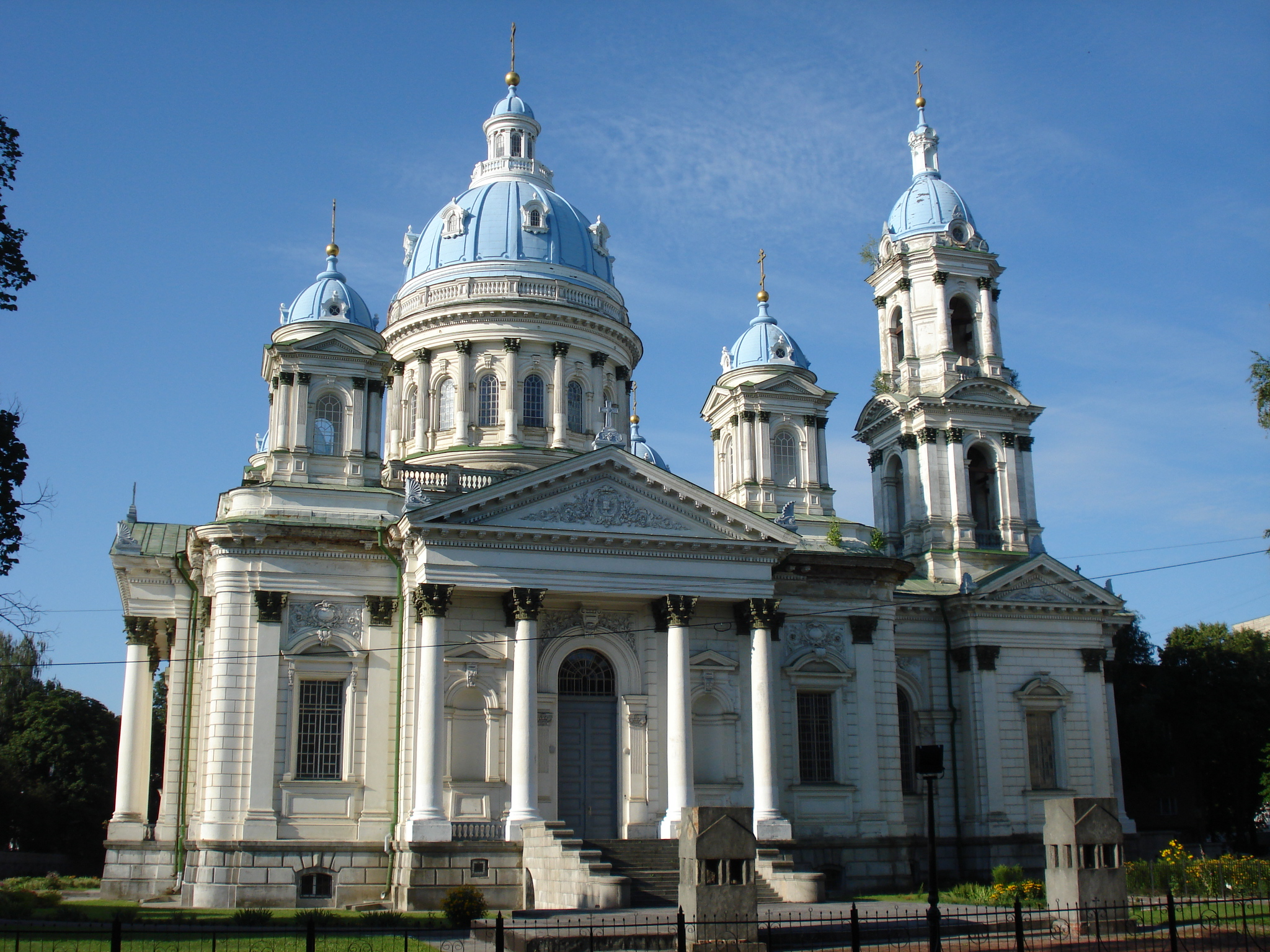
Trinity Cathedral

- The city centre is dominated by the large cathedral of the Saviour's Transfiguration. It is a neoclassical structure of the 18th century, extensively repaired and reconstructed in 1858 and in the 1880s when the 56-metre-high bell tower (180 ft) was added. The interior features frescoes by Vladimir Makovsky and Klavdiy Lebedev.
- The Resurrection Church (1702), the oldest structure in the town, has had restoration work.
- The cathedral of the monastery of St. Pantaleon was erected in 1911 to a design by Aleksey Shchusev and resembles medieval monuments of Novgorod and Pskov.
- A church of Saints Peter and Paul in the town's cemetery was built in 1851. Beside the church, there are tombs of the Kharytonenkos and Sukhanovs with monuments by sculptors A. Croisy and M. Antokolski.
- The Cathedral of Holy Trinity was built in 1902–1914 on the same pattern as the Cathedral of St. Isaac in St. Petersburg. The author of the design was Sumy architect G. Sholts. The work on the decorative design was not completed because of the revolutionary events of 1917.

=== Museums ===
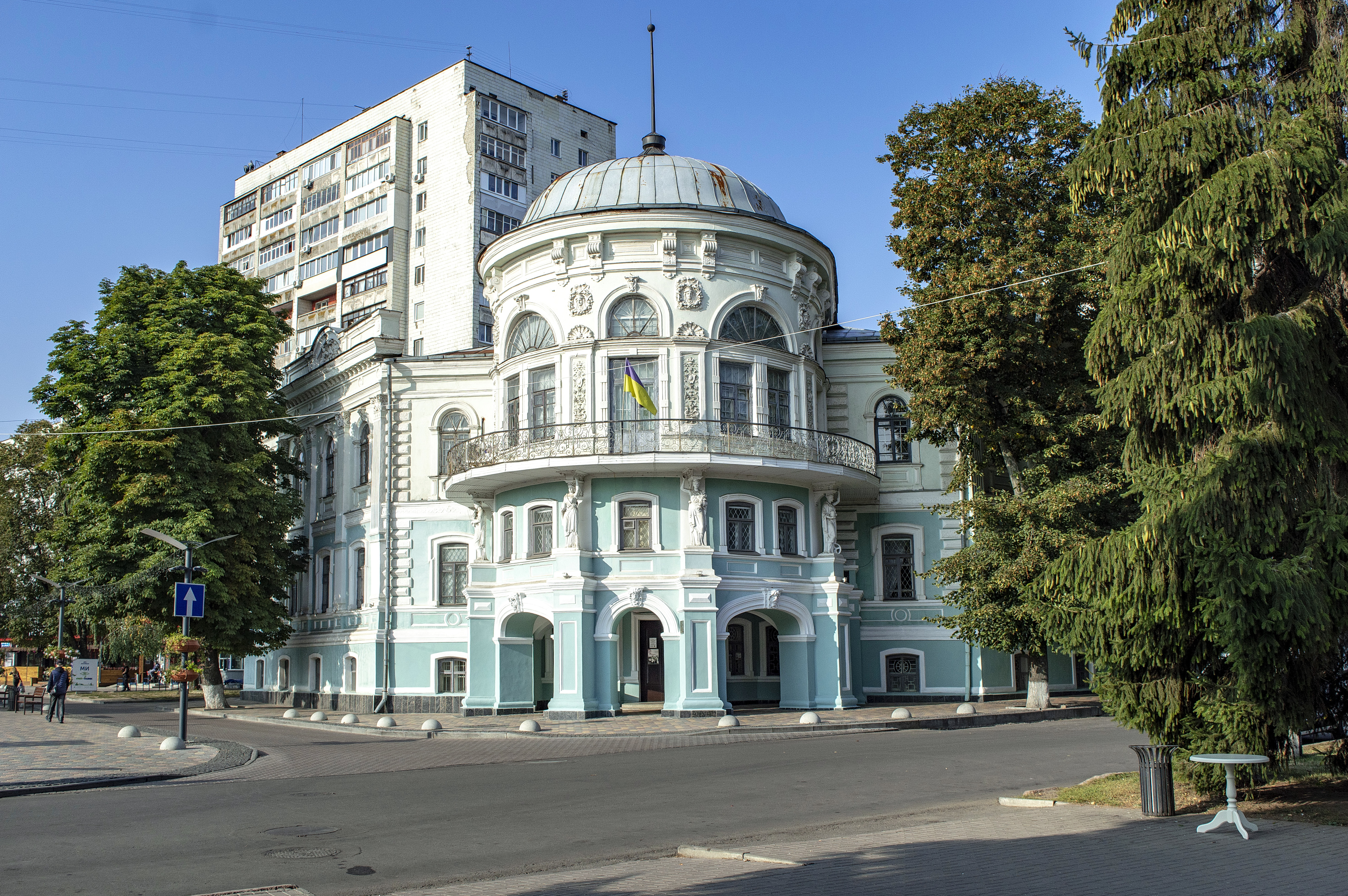
Local museum

The Sumy Regional Art Museum was opened in 1920. It started with nationalized private collections of the town and district. Paintings of Taras Shevchenko, Vladimir Borovikovsky, I. Shyskin, Arkhip Kuindzhi and Tetyana Yablonska are on display, including a Dutch landscape by a painter of Jan van Goyen's circle. Today the museum contains unique paintings and works of applied art. The building of the early 20th century originally belonged to the State Bank.

The Museum of Local Lore was opened in 1920. In the years of German occupation, the most important items of its collections were lost. Today, it contains unique collections covering archeology and the natural history of the Sumy region. It is located in the building of the 19th century, which originally was the seat of the district government. In 1905, it was given to the printing house and publishing house of the first Sumy newspapers. In different years, the building was visited by A. Kuprin and V. Korolenko, the famous Russian writers.

The Chekhov Museum, located on Chekhov street is an architectural complex representing Lintvarev's country estate of the 18th and 19th centuries. In 1888 and 1889, the great writer and dramatist Anton Chekhov was dreaming of settling in Luka forever, but his dream did not come true. "Abbacia and the Adriatic Sea are wonderful, but Luka and Psiol are better", he wrote in 1894 in a letter from Italy to his friends in Sumy. This is also a place where n Chekhov's brother, Nikolai Chekhov, died in 1889.

The Museum of Banking history in the Sumy oblast and the History of Ukrainian Money was founded in 2006 to commemorate the 10th anniversary of the Ukrainian Academy of Banking based on a unique collection of Ukrainian bonds – the paper money out of circulation, which were given to the academy by the National Bank of Ukraine. The exposition of the bonds is arranged in the thematic-chronological order - from the first appearance of money to the present day. In addition to the numerous historical documents, photographs, metal money (coins, souvenir bars), and commemorative medals of the National Bank of Ukraine, there is an exhibition presenting technical appliances used in the banking industry in the late 20th century.

== Notable people ==
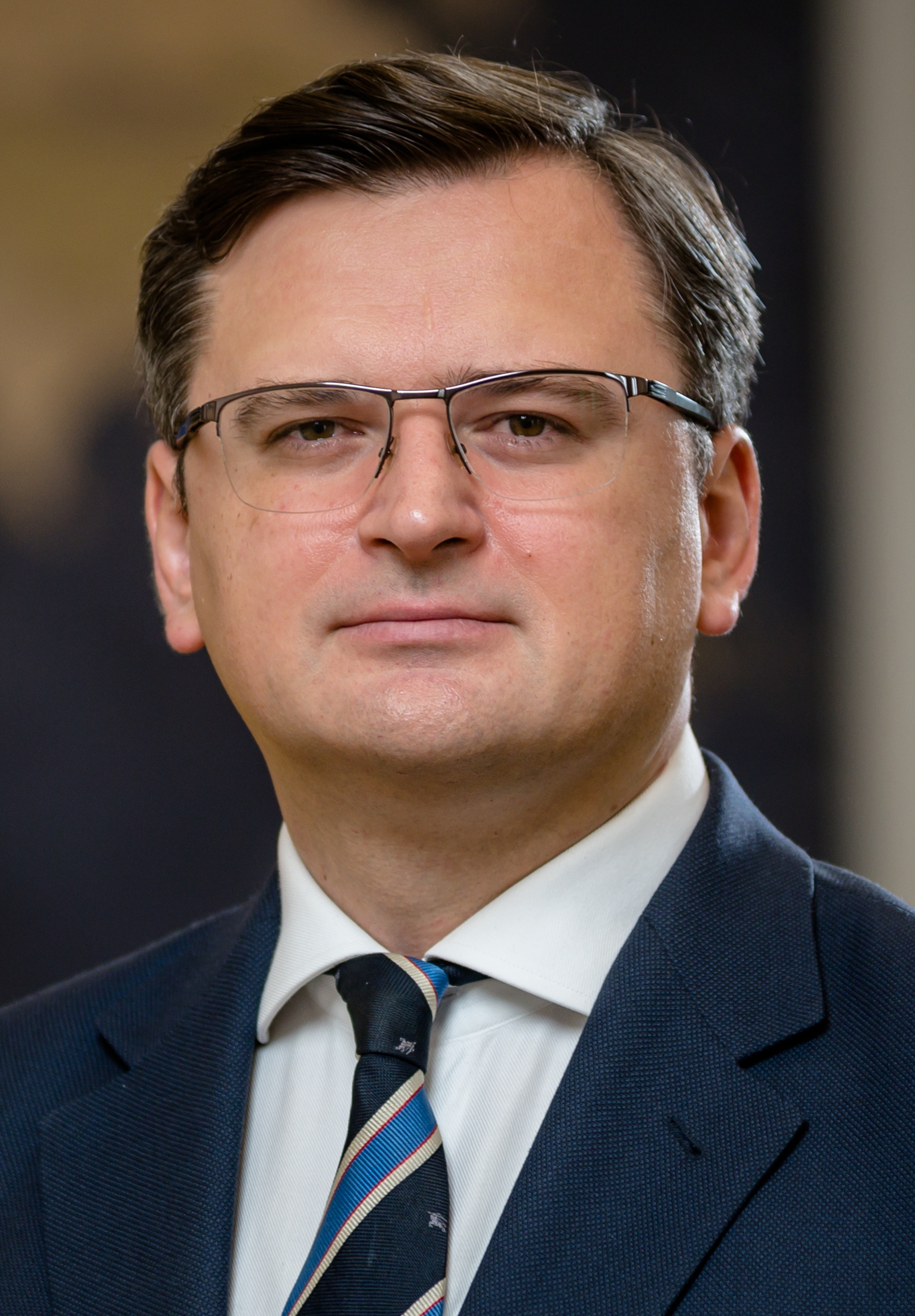
Dmytro Kuleba, 2021

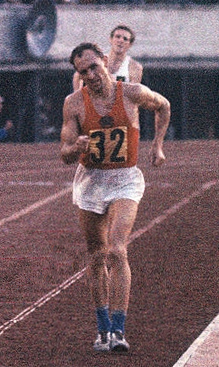
Volodymyr Holubnychy, 1964

- Aleksey Alchevsky (1835–1901), industrialist and philanthropist, founded the city of Alchevsk
- Hanna Bezliudna (born 1972) is a Ukrainian media manager, producer and public figure.
- Karl Burman (1882–1965), an Estonian architect and painter.
- Mykola Hrunskyi (early 20th C.), a senior researcher specializing in studying of the Russian language at the Linguistic Institute of the National Academy of Sciences of Ukraine
- Dmytro Kuleba (born 1981) a politician and diplomat; Minister of Foreign Affairs of Ukraine in 2020–2024.
- Anatoliy Mokrenko (1933–2020) a Ukrainian operatic baritone
- Volodymyr Pakholiuk and Albert Tsukrenko, members of the techno punk duo Khamerman znyshchuye virusy.
- Yekaterina Peshkova (1887–1965), a Soviet human rights activist and first wife of Maxim Gorky.
- Pyotr Voevodin (1884–1964), a Russian revolutionary, Soviet politician and film producer.

=== Sport ===
- Kazimierz Gzowski (1901–1986) a Polish cavalry officer and horse rider, team silver medallist at the 1928 Summer Olympics
- Yevhen Hlyva (born 1983), distance runner
- Volodymyr Holubnychy (1936–2021), race-walker, four-time Olympic medallist
- Oleh Husiev (born 1983), a footballer with 319 club appearances and 98 caps for Ukraine
- Volodymyr Romanenko (born 1985) football midfielder with over 330 club appearances
- Kateryna Samson (born 1988) is a Ukrainian football goalkeeper with 21 caps for Ukraine women
- Serhiy Strashnenko (born 1953) a Soviet former football goalkeeper with over 400 club appearances

== Sports ==
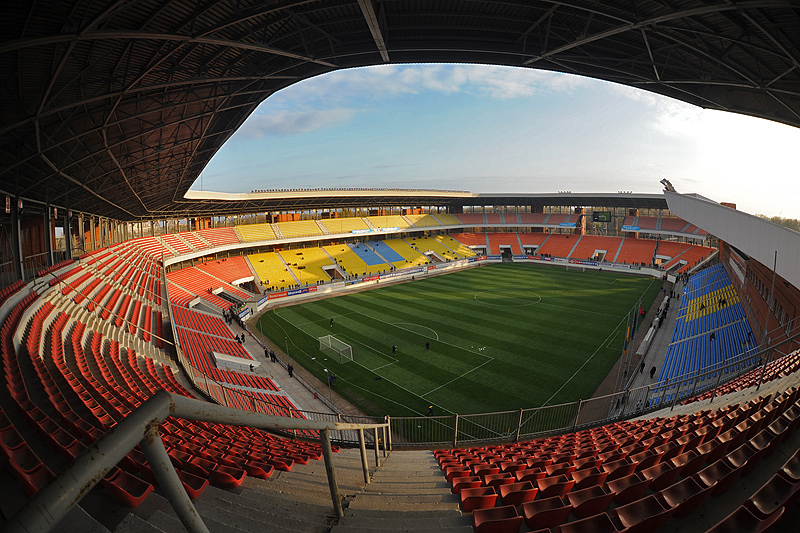
Yuvileiny Stadium

The field hockey club MSC Sumchanka has won the Ukrainian championship 12 times and was the European champion once.

Sumy is home to the Ukrainian First League football team FC Alians and Ukrainian Second League football team FC Sumy.

The Ukrainian Premier League football club FC Kharkiv were leasing the city's state-of-the-art Yuvileiny Stadium.

The Yuvileiny Stadium, formerly known as Spartak, was planned to be renovated just before dissolution of the Soviet Union and in 1989 was demolished to be built anew. It was not until 1998 that the actual construction was resumed and finally finished in 2001.

== Twin towns – sister cities ==
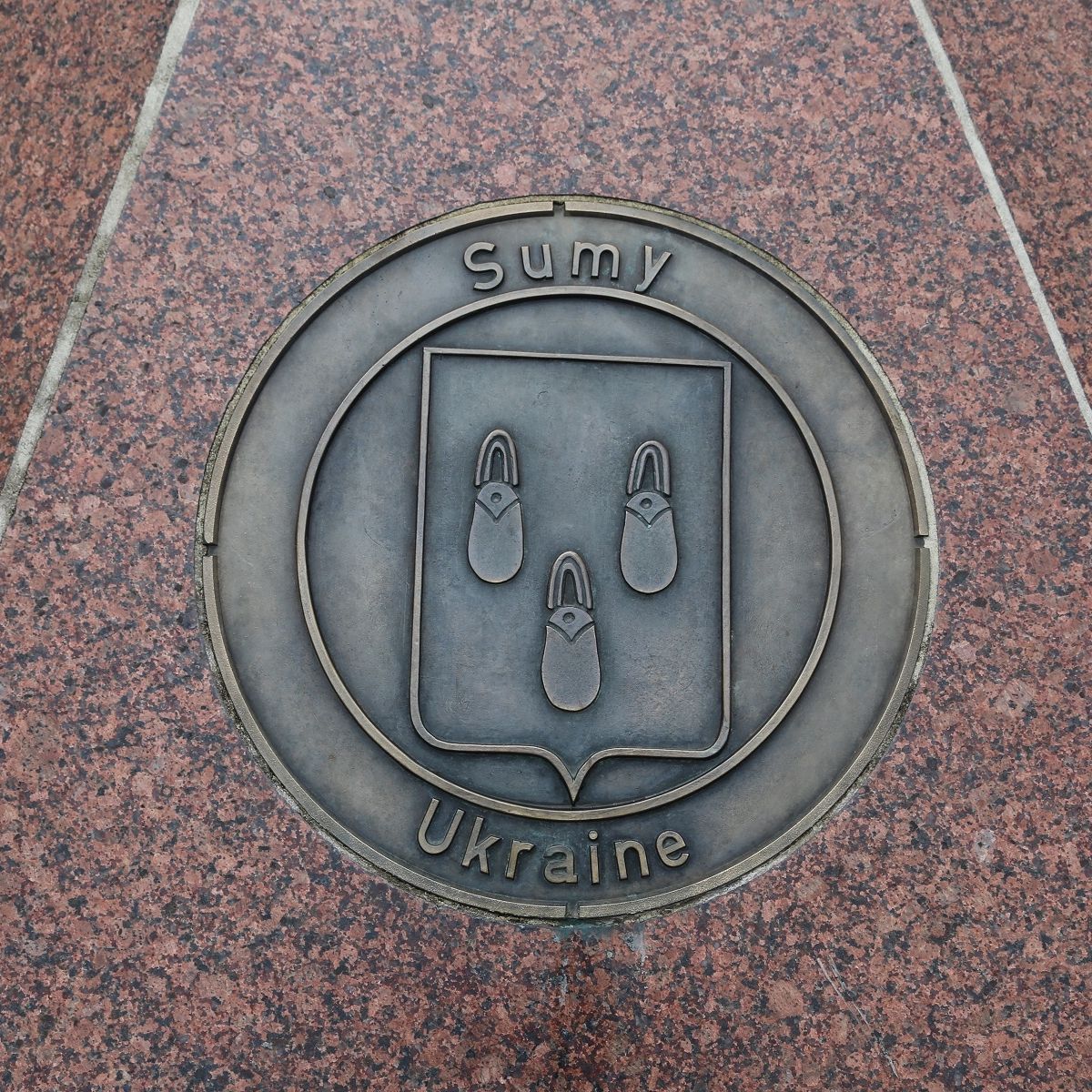
Coat of arms at twin town Celle (Germany), granite artwork below signpost.

Sumy is twinned with:

- Sacramento, United States (2023)
- Celle, Germany (1990)
- Gorzów Wielkopolski, Poland (2006)
- (Georgia (country)) Kutaisi, Georgia (2018)
- Lublin, Poland (2002)
- Vratsa, Bulgaria (1966)
- Xinxiang, China (2019)
- Zhuji, China (2019)

=== Other forms of cooperation ===
- Banská Bystrica, Slovakia (2016)
- Wohlen, Switzerland (2015)
