= Sumykhimprom =

Chemical plant in Sumy, Ukraine

Public Joint-Stock Company "Sumykhimprom"
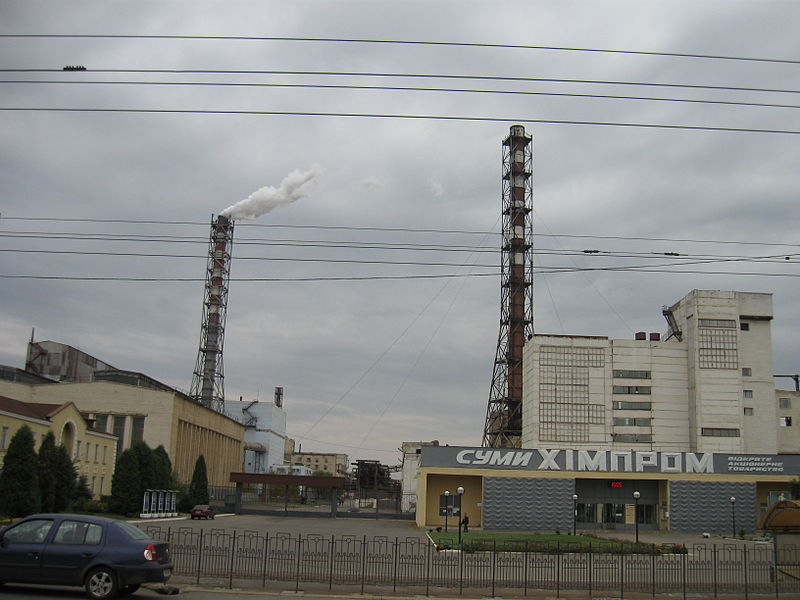
- Native name: ПАТ «Сумихімпром»
- Formerly: Sumy Superphosphate Plant (1954-1964), Sumy Chemical Plant (1964-1975), PA Sumy Khimprom (1975-1995)
- Type: PJSC
- Industry: chemical
- Founded: 1953 in Sumy, Ukraine
- Headquarters: Sumy, Ukraine
- Key people: Dmytro Firtash
- Production output: fertilizers, nitrogen compounds, electric energy
- Revenue: ▲ ₴868,811,000 (2010)
- Operating income: ▲ -₴50,291 (2010)
- Net income: ▲ ₴1,349,000 (2015)
- Total assets: ▲ ₴979,760,000 (2010)
- Total equity: ▼ -₴276,420 (2010)
- Number of employees: about 4,500 people (2010)
- Parent: PJSC SHC "Titan of Ukraine" (after 2010)
- Website: sumykhimprom.com.ua

Sumykhimprom is a chemical industry plant based in Sumy, Ukraine that produces mineral fertilizers, coagulants and additives to cement, acid, titanium dioxide and pigments, and other types of chemical products.

The plant is operated by PJSC "Sumykhimprom", a public joint-stock company which owns a large energy-chemical complex, the industrial site of which occupies 226 hectares. The plant is located in the southern part of the city of Sumy. The industrial complex consists of 11 main workshops, 20 auxiliary workshops, and 7 units of non-industrial groups (catering plant, sanatorium-dispensary, etc.)

PJSC "Sumykhimprom" has the status of a basic enterprise of the chemical industry of Ukraine for the production of phosphate mineral fertilizers. The company also takes care of a basketball club of the same name and a joint volleyball team with Sumy State University named «Khimprom-SumDU».

On 21 March 2022, during the battle of Sumy, a Russian airstrike damaged one of the ammonia tanks at the Sumykhimprom plant, contaminating land within a 2.5 km radius including the villages of Novoselytsia and Verkhnya Syrovatka. Due to the direction of the wind, the city of Sumy was largely unaffected despite its proximity to the leak.
