= Russian occupation of Sumy Oblast =

Military occupation by Russia

- Part of the Russian invasion of Ukraine
- Territory of Sumy Oblast controlled by Russia shown in pink; territory controlled by Ukraine shown in yellow and blue (as of March 2023)
Location	Sumy Oblast, Ukraine

On 24 February 2022, the Russian military invaded Ukraine and began capturing and occupying parts of the Sumy Oblast. Russian forces failed to capture the capital of the oblast, Sumy, however, some settlements were captured, such as Trostianets.

On 4 April 2022, Governor of Sumy Oblast Dmytro Zhyvytskyi stated that Russian troops no longer occupied any towns or villages in Sumy Oblast and had mostly withdrawn, while Ukrainian troops were working to push out the remaining units. Four days later, he said that all Russian troops had left the region, but it was still unsafe due to rigged explosives and other ammunition Russian troops had left behind.

By March 2025, Russian forces had begun an incursion into the northern part of Sumy Oblast.

== 2022 Russian occupation ==
=== Konotop Raion ===
On 2 April, it was reported that the Russian army maintained a corridor in Konotop Raion through which equipment from Kyiv and Chernihiv could be withdrawn to Russia; local authorities said that Russian forces remained near Konotop, Bilopillia, Buryn, Putyvl, and Nova Sloboda. The next day, Ukrainian MP Olexander Kachura stated on Twitter that all Russian forces had left Konotop Raion.

On 5 April, Governor Zhyvytsky stated that the bodies of at least three tortured civilians had been found in the Konotop Raion.

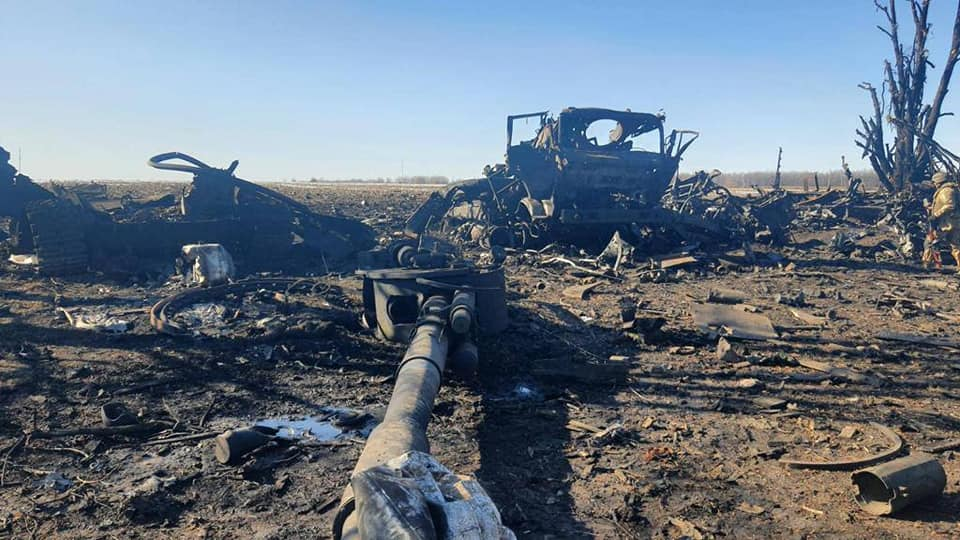
Remnants of a Russian column ambushed by Ukrainian forces on 17 March 2022

=== Romny Raion ===
On the evening of 24 February, the first day of the Russian invasion, two convoys of Russian soldiers coming from the cities of Nedryhailiv and Konotop (east and north of Romny, respectively) made their way in the direction of Romny. Between 26 and 27 February, more Russian vehicles headed towards Romny from Krasnopillia, bypassing Sumy. The second convoy was bombed by Ukrainian forces before it reached Romny. On February 28, Russian forces attacked the Romny Correctional Colony. Meanwhile that same day, Russian forces crushed a civilian in the village of Pohozha Krynytsia when he attempted to use his car to block Russian tanks passing through.

On the first day of March, Russian forces captured the villages of Bilovods'ke and Bobryk, just south of Romny, which had been contested in previous days. On 4 March, after negotiations with Russia and Ukraine, Romny was selected as a humanitarian corridor for civilians fleeing Sumy, Kharkiv, and Chernihiv oblasts. That same day, civilians from the village of Spartak attempted to block Russian vehicles passing from Nedryhailiv to Romny. They succeeded in blocking the road, although an ensuing attack by the Russians resulted in one civilian dying. Later that evening on 4 March, Russian forces blocked the road from Lypova Dolyna towards Romny and Bilovod'ske, in southern Romny Raion, while the highway between Nedryhailiv and Romny was still under Ukrainian control. During the night between 4 and 5 March, Russian soldiers destroyed a poultry farm, killed around 100,000 poultry and causing an estimated one million hryvnias' worth of damage.

On 5 March, three out of four hostages who were taken by Russian troops were released, according to the head of Romny Raion, Denys Vashchenko. That same day, Russian soldiers standing on the road fired at Ukrainian TDF troops at a gas station, leaving one Ukrainian soldier killed and two wounded. On the evening of March 5, Russian soldiers fired at two cars traveling from Sumy to Romny, in the village of Pustovyitivka. Three civilians were wounded, and one civilian was killed in the shooting. Later that evening, in the village of Skrypali in Romny raion, Ukrainian forces destroyed a Russian column, and killed an unspecified number of soldiers. In the evening between 5 and 6 March, shots were fired in Pustoviitivka and Romny, with no injuries. The shooting in Romny, however, knocked out electricity for parts of the town.

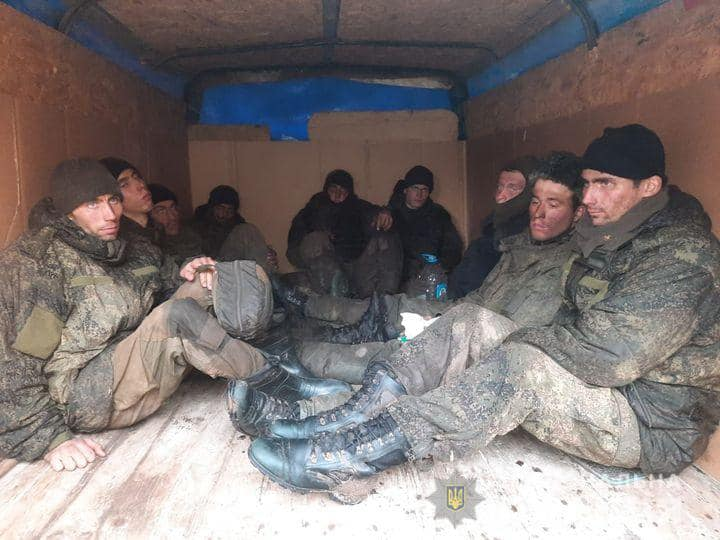
Russian forces captured in Romny Raion

On 11 March, Vashchenko reported that Ukrainian forces unblocked the road between Romny and Lokhvytsia, allowing civilians to flee southwards. That morning near Romny, police and Ukrainian TDF discovered and detained 29 Russian soldiers in a field, all of whom claimed to be lost. The next day on 12 March, green corridors were established in Sumy Oblast, where civilians from Sumy, Trostianets, Konotop, Lebedyn, Velyka Pysarivka, and Krasnopillia could flee towards Poltava Oblast. Humanitarian corridors restarted again on 18 March. The Ukrainian General Staff reported on 19 March that the 1st Guards Tank Army of Russia began to concentrate efforts on surrounding Sumy, while also attempting offensives in Trostianets, Pryluky, and Romny, although these offensives did not succeed.

=== Boromlia ===
According to locals, forces of the Donetsk People's Republic entered the village of Boromlia on the morning of 24 February.

Boromlia was struck by Russian airstrikes on 3 and 5 March 2022. According to residents, there was no Ukrainian military presence in Boromlia at the time, and the airstrikes caused extensive damage to civilian infrastructure: towns, shops, and a school.

The Russian military entered the village after the strikes, and Boromlia reportedly came under Russian occupation on 9 March. Due to the village's location on a highway, Russian columns frequently passed through it. According to locals, over 500 Russian military vehicles were in the village, and occupation forces consisted of Russians, Buryats, Chechens, and, mostly, the forces of the Donetsk People's Republic.

Instances of torture, robbery, and abduction of local residents by Russian forces were reported during the occupation of Boromlia. According to Vasyl Romanika, head of the village administration, four people were tortured and killed during the occupation. Local officials claimed that a man was tortured and robbed in the village on 14 March.

The occupation of Boromlia ended on 26 March; Russian forces left during the night, and Ukrainian forces entered in the afternoon.

=== Trostianets ===
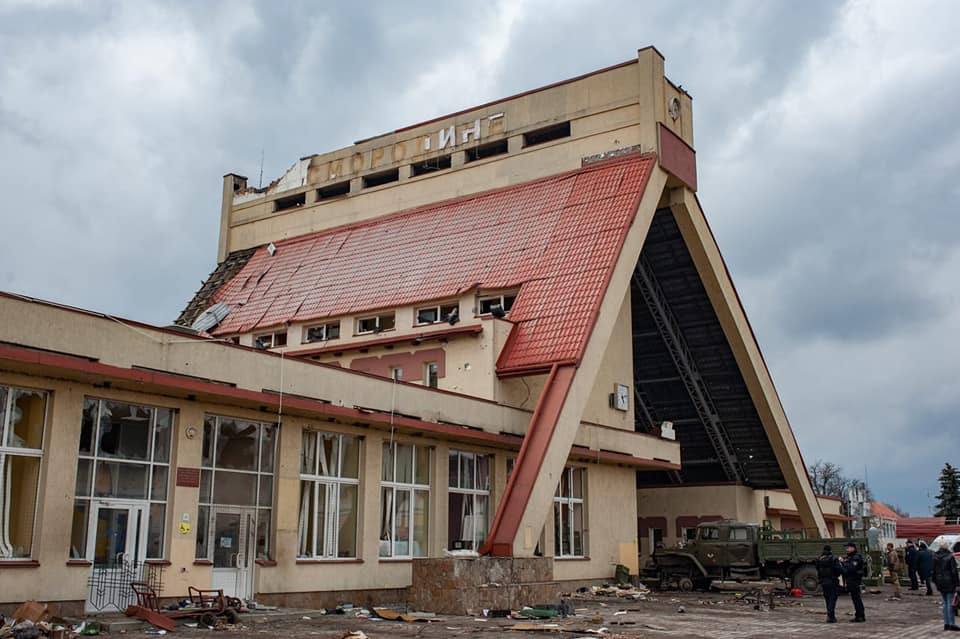
The destroyed railway station "Trostianets-Smorodyne"

As part of an offensive towards Kyiv, columns of tanks from the Russian 4th Guards Tank Division first passed through Trostianets on 24 February, with no real plans of occupying the city. However, the offensive quickly began to stall due to Ukrainian resistance west and southwest of Trostianets, and the detonation of a bridge south of the city. As a result, Trostianets, which was first envisioned as "little more than a speed bump" in Russian plans to swiftly take Kyiv, was occupied by a garrison of Russian troops on 1 March.

About a dozen checkpoints were established in and around the city. The main train station served as the Russian headquarters, and the police station and airfield also came under occupation. The number of Russian troops occupying Trostianets has been variously estimated between 300 and 800. Separatist militiamen from Donetsk and Luhansk arrived in the city following a mid-March troop rotation, and the presence of contingents of Buryat and South Ossetian fighters has also been reported. Units of the elite 4th Guards Tank Division, including the 12th and 13th Guards Tank Regiments, are reported to have been among the occupying forces.

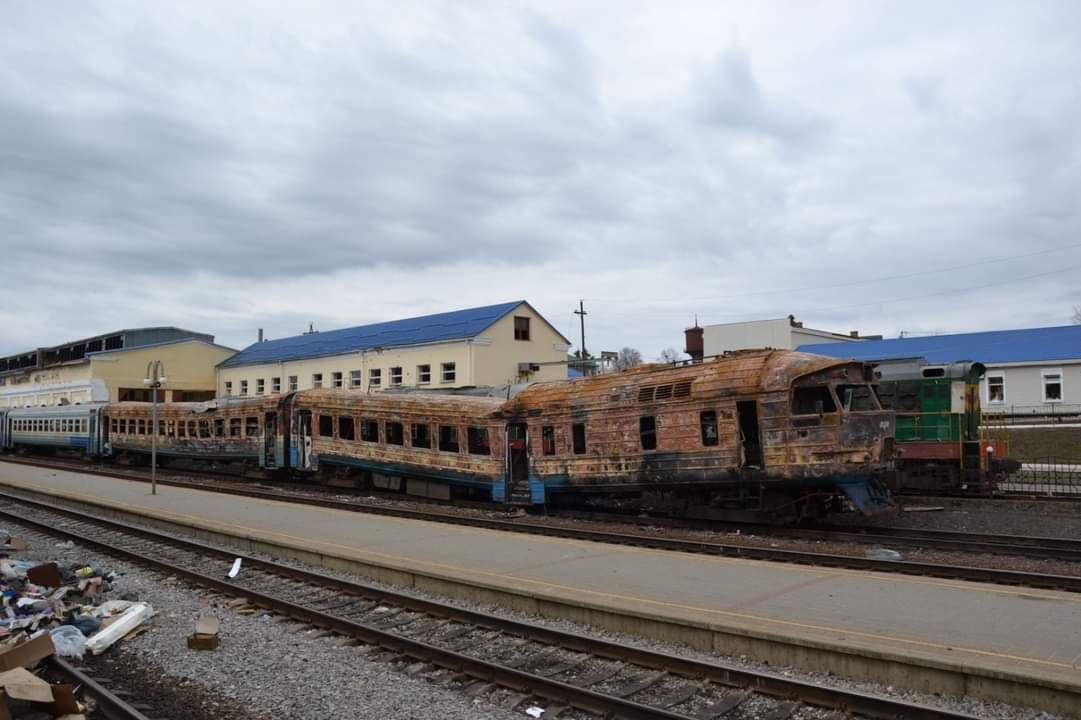
Destruction near the Smorodyne locomotive depot

During the occupation, Ukrainian police officers remained in the city incognito, supporting both local civilians and partisan forces operating in the area. The town's mayor, Yuriy Bova, hid in nearby villages, receiving some criticism for his decision not to stay in town, but continued to coordinate Ukrainian resistance, including shelling of Russian positions.

The Russian occupying force allegedly engaged in widespread looting, and Guardian journalists found evidence of torture and summary executions in the city. Residents of Trostianets during the occupation stated that people were shot in the streets. Unless neighbors or other civilians carried in the bodies of the dead, they would be left in the streets. These included the bodies of dead Russian troops, who were left there following the Russian retreat. Bova stated that at least 50 civilians were killed under Russian occupation. According to residents, two civilians were also killed in the neighboring village of Bilka, Okhtyrka Raion, which the Russians occupied on 2 March.

Zhyvytskyi stated that Russian troops in Trostianets laid mines everywhere, including the town cemetery. After the Russian withdrawal, seven civilians were killed and at least two wounded due to traps laid by Russian soldiers across the town.

==== Ukrainian counterattack ====
A Ukrainian counteroffensive recaptured the city on 26 March. During the fighting, the town's hospital was shelled, with residents blaming Russian forces. After combat and shelling around the outskirts of the city, Russian troops largely withdrew overnight before the arrival of Ukrainian forces. An AFP report recorded "a dozen" destroyed or damaged tanks and armored vehicles. The New York Times reported that food had grown scarce by the time the city was recaptured by Ukraine.

=== Sumy Raion ===
==== Malyi Vystorop ====
The village of Malyi Vystorop was occupied on 17 March. Russian forces took up residence in the village's vocational college, which they looted, according to its employees. When Russian forces left on 25 March, they fired reportedly on the college from tanks.

==== Velykyi Bobryk ====
The village of Velykyi Bobryk came under Russian occupation on 17 March. Russian troops occupied a school building, and a local café served as headquarters. Locals accuse the Russian forces of looting shops, occupying and looting civilian homes, beating and torturing civilians, shooting indiscriminately, firing on civilian houses with BMPs, and abducting two civilian residents. The Russians left Velykyi Bobryk during the early morning hours of 26 March.

==== Steblianky ====
The village of Steblianky came under Russian occupation on 19 March. Locals claim that Russian forces broke into unoccupied homes and looted them. The Ukrainian military forced the Russians out of the village on 26 March.

== 2024 Russian raids on border settlements ==
On 9 June 2024, Russian forces raided the village of Ryzhivka, located near the border, close to the Russian settlement of Tyotkino. Geolocation footage confirmed that Russian troops had entered the village and advanced approximately 730 meters into Ukraine. However, the next day, Russian forces withdrew from the area. Throughout June, Russian troops continued to launch limited cross-border attacks in Sumy Oblast, targeting the villages of Zhuravka, Chuikivka, Rozhkovychi, and Sytne, but all attempts ended in failure.

== 2025 Russian offensive ==
On 10 January 2025, Russian forces crossed the international border and entered Sumy Oblast, pushing west of Zhuravka. By 20 February, Russian sources claimed that their forces had captured the village of Basivka, followed by claims of seizing Novenke and making progress toward northern Zhuravka days later. On 28 February, Ukraine's Center for Combatting Disinformation acknowledged that Russian forces were attacking along the international border near Basivka and Novenke. Meanwhile, DeepState described both Basivka and Novenke as "grey zones."

On 2 March, Russian military bloggers claimed that Russian forces had seized Zhuravka. On 7 March, Russian sources claimed that their armed forces had captured Novenke. The next day, based on released geolocation footage, it was highly likely that Russian forces had captured Novenke.

Between 12 and 17 March, Russian forces pushed further west and northwest of Basivka and west of Zhuravka, attempting to consolidate their positions in the area.

After successfully recapturing the town of Sudzha, President Putin proposed establishing a "buffer zone" in Sumy Oblast to protect Kursk from future Ukrainian attacks. By 23 March 2025, Russian sources claimed their troops had moved into Volodymyrivka. A few days later, geolocated footage indicated that Russian forces had seized the border checkpoint between Sumy and Sudzha to the east of Basivka. At the end of March, Russian forces captured Veselivka, which was later confirmed by the Russian Ministry of Defense. However, Ukrainian officials denied the reports of the Russian breakthrough.

By April 2025, Ukraine estimated that around 62,000 to 65,000 Russian soldiers mainly from 76th Airborne Division and the 83rd VDV Brigade and border guards were in Kursk Oblast. On April 13, Russian state media claimed that their forces had seized 70 square kilometers in Sumy Oblast. On April 24, Russian forces were confirmed to have captured Basivka and advanced southwards to Loknia. By 24 May, geolocated footage showed that Russian forces have captured central and southern parts of Loknia and advanced into northern part of the Yunakivka.

== Control of settlements ==
Name	Pop.	Raion	Held by	As of	More information
Andriivka	83	Sumy	Contested	13 May 2026	Contested by Russia before 6 June 2025. Captured by Russia 6 June 2025. Recaptured by Ukraine on 23 June 2025. Recaptured by Russia before 25 January 2026. Recaptured by Ukraine on 22 April 2026. Re-contested by Russia on 13 May 2026.
Basivka	644	Sumy	Russia	9 Apr 2025	Contested by Russia since 13 March 2025. Captured by Russia 9 April 2025.
Bilovody	487	Sumy	Russia	26 May 2025	Contested by Russia since 29 April 2025. Captured by Russia 25 May 2025.
Buryn	8,359	Konotop	Ukraine	6 Apr 2022	Captured by Russia 24 February 2022. Recaptured by Ukraine 4 April 2022.
Hlukhiv	32,248	Hlukhiv	Ukraine	6 Apr 2022	
Hrabovske	718	Sumy	Russia	21 Dec 2025	Contested by Russia on 20 December 2025. Captured by Russia 21 December 2025.
Ivolzhanske	226	Sumy	Contested	21 May 2026	Contested by Russia on 21 May 2026.
Kindrativka	852	Sumy	Contested	17 Feb 2026	Contested by Russia since 7 June 2025. Claimed captured by Russian sources as of 10 June 2025. Captured by Russia 16 June 2025. Contested by Ukraine since 8 July 2025. Captured by Ukraine on 25 July 2025. Re-contested by Russia since 17 February 2026.
Konotop	84,787	Konotop	Ukraine	6 Apr 2022	Captured by Russia 25 February 2022. Recaptured by Ukraine 4 April 2022.
Kostiantynivka	246	Sumy	Contested	30 Oct 2025	Contested by Russia before 29 May 2025. Captured by Russia 29 May 2025. Recontested by Ukraine since 11 August 2025.
Krolevets	22,437	Konotop	Ukraine	6 Apr 2022	
Lebedyn	24,238	Lebedyn	Ukraine	6 Apr 2022	
Loknya	368	Sumy	Russia	1 Jul 2025	Contested by Russia since 24 April 2025. Claimed captured by Russian sources as of 10 June 2025. Confirmed captured by Russia 1 July 2025.
Myropillia	2,873	Sumy	Contested	11 Jul 2025	Contested by Russia since 11 July 2025.
Myropilske	158	Sumy	Russia	23 Apr 2026	Contested by Russia on 18 April 2026. Captured by Russia 23 April 2026.
Nova Sich	378	Sumy	Contested	24 Jun 2026	Contested by Russia on 24 June 2026.
Novenke	15	Sumy	Russia	8 Mar 2025	Contested by Russia since 27 February 2025. Captured by Russia on 8 March 2025.
Novodmytrivka	242	Sumy	Contested	28 May 2026	Contested by Russia on 28 May 2026.
Novomykolaivka	136	Sumy	Russia	18 Jul 2025	Contested by Russia since 4 July 2025. Captured by Russia 4 July 2025. Contested by Ukraine on 8 July 2025. Recaptured by Russia on 19 July 2025.
Okhtyrka	47,216	Okhtyrka	Ukraine	6 Apr 2022	
Oleksiivka	547	Sumy	Contested	7 Nov 2025	Contested by Russia since 7 June 2025. Claimed captured by Russian sources as of 10 June 2025. Confirmed captured by Russia on 12 June 2025. Recaptured by Ukraine on 21 July 2025. Recontested by Russia since 11 August 2025. Recaptured by Russia on 5 November 2025. Recontested by Ukraine since 7 November 2025.
Pokrovka	768	Sumy	Contested	8 Feb 2026	Contested by Russia on 8 February 2026.
Popivka	6	Sumy	Russia	28 May 2026	Contested by Russia before 28 May 2026. Captured by Russia 28 May 2026.
Prokhody	60	Sumy	Contested	18 Apr 2026	Contested by Russia on 18 April 2026.
Putyvl	15,100	Konotop	Ukraine	6 Apr 2022	Captured by Russia 27 February 2022. Recaptured by Ukraine 2 April 2022.
Pysarivka	829	Sumy	Contested	24 Jun 2026	Contested by Russia on 24 June 2026.
Riasne	814	Sumy	Contested	8 Aug 2026	Contested by Russia since 3 May 2026. Captured by Ukraine on 23 May 2026. Re-contested by Russia since 28 May 2026. Captured by Russia on 13 July 2026. Recontested by Ukraine on 8 August 2026.
Romny	38,305	Romny	Ukraine	6 Apr 2022	
Ryzhivka	854	Sumy	Gray zone	12 Jun 2024	Uncontrolled before 9 June 2024. Raided by Russia on 9 June 2024. Uncontrolled since 10 June 2024.
Shostka	73,197	Shostka	Ukraine	6 Apr 2022	
Sopych	763	Sumy	Russia	6 Mar 2026	Contested by Russia before 6 March 2026. Captured by Russia 6 March 2026.
Sumy	259,660	Sumy	Ukraine	6 Apr 2022	See Battle of Sumy, Sumykhimprom ammonia leak, October missile strikes
Taratutyne	73	Sumy	Contested	20 Jul 2026	Contested by Russia on 20 July 2026.
Trostianets	19,797	Okhtyrka	Ukraine	6 Apr 2022	Captured by Russia 1 March 2022. Recaptured by Ukraine 26 March 2022.
Varachyne	60	Sumy	Ukraine	21 Aug 2025	Contested by Russia before 23 July 2025. Captured by Russia 23 July 2025. Recaptured by Ukraine on 21 August 2025.
Veselivka	67	Sumy	Russia	30 Mar 2025	Claimed captured by Russia on 29 March 2025. Confirmed captured by Russia on 30 March 2025.
Vodolahy	151	Sumy	Russia	4 Jun 2025	Contested by Russia before 4 June 2025. Captured by Russia 4 June 2025.
Volodymyrivka	144	Sumy	Russia	29 May 2025	Contested by Russia before 29 May 2025. Captured by Russia 29 May 2025.
Vysoke	28	Sumy	Russia	28 May 2026	Contested by Russia on 19 January 2026. Captured by Russia 28 May 2026.
Yablunivka	168	Sumy	Russia	20 Jul 2025	Contested by Russia since 7 June 2025. Captured by Russia 20 July 2025.
Yunakivka	1,741	Sumy	Contested	14 Jul 2025	Contested by Russia since 14 July 2025.
Zhuravka	163	Sumy	Russia	17 May 2025	Contested by Russia since 21 March 2025. Captured by Russia 26 April 2025.
Zapsillia	654	Sumy	Contested	9 Jun 2026	Contested by Russia on 9 June 2026.

== See also ==
- Outline of the Russo-Ukrainian war
- Russian-occupied territories of Ukraine (former occupation marked in italics)
  - Russian occupation of Crimea
  - Russian occupation of Chernihiv Oblast
  - Russian occupation of Donetsk Oblast
  - Russian occupation of Dnipropetrovsk Oblast
  - Russian occupation of Kharkiv Oblast
  - Russian occupation of Kherson Oblast
  - Russian occupation of Kyiv Oblast
  - Russian occupation of Luhansk Oblast
  - Russian occupation of Mykolaiv Oblast
  - Russian occupation of Zaporizhzhia Oblast
  - Russian occupation of Zhytomyr Oblast
  - Snake Island campaign
- Annexation of Crimea by the Russian Federation
- Russian annexation of Donetsk, Kherson, Luhansk and Zaporizhzhia oblasts
