= 2025 Sumy offensive =

Russian incursion to Ukraine Sumy Oblast

- Part of northern Ukraine border skirmishes
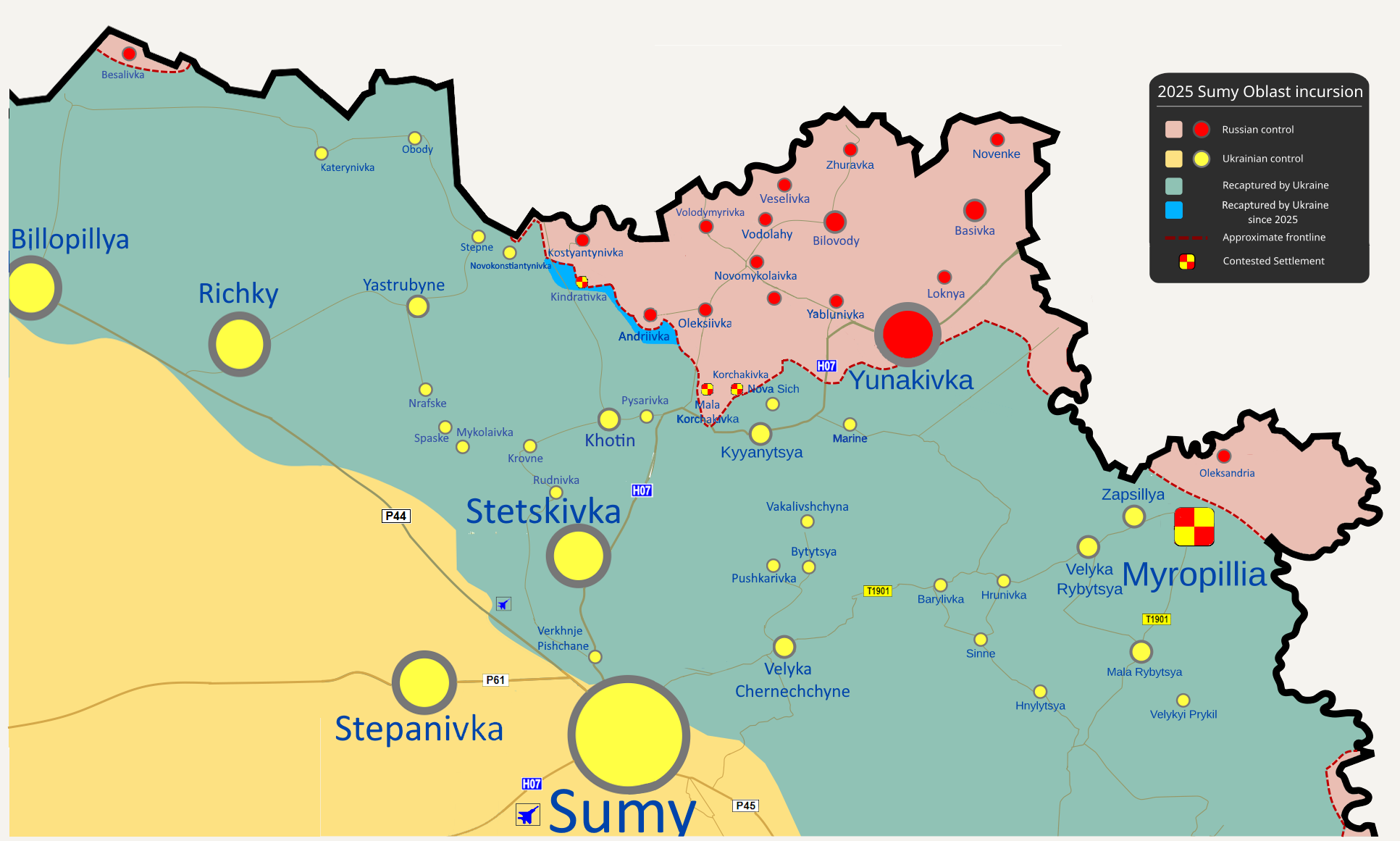
- Map of Sumy oblast as of 26 June 2025
Date	19 February – 26 June 2025
Location	Sumy Oblast, Ukraine
Result	Inconclusive
Territorial changes	Russian army captures several border villages, but fails to reach Sumy city.

Belligerents
Russia	Ukraine

Units involved
34th Mountain Motor Rifle Brigade; 51st Airborne Regiment; 56th Air Assault Regiment; 76th Air Assault Division; 83rd Air Assault Brigade; Elements of the 810th Naval Infantry Brigade	15th Mobile Border Detachment; 36th Marine Brigade; 78th Airborne Assault Regiment; 103rd Territorial Defense Brigade; 4th Special Purpose Regiment; Izmail Border Detachment; 67th Mechanized Brigade; Kraken Regiment; International Legion of the Defence Intelligence of Ukraine; Tymur Special Unit

Strength
Per Wall Street Journal: 50,000	Per Wall Street Journal: ~16,600

Casualties and losses
Ukrainian claim: 300–400 casualties per day	Russian claim: 255 casualties 4 combat vehicles 14 vehicles 3 field guns
- 56,000 residents evacuated, and 2 injured

In February 2025, Russian forces launched a cross-border offensive from Russia into Ukraine's adjacent Sumy Oblast. The operation succeeded Russia's efforts to regain control of Kursk Oblast, following Ukraine's Kursk campaign in 2024. Russia entered the Sumy region near the villages of Novenke and Basivka. By the end of February, Ukraine's Center for Combatting Disinformation acknowledged the presence of Russian forces, while DeepState described Basivka and Novenke as "gray zones."

== Background ==
Throughout 2024, Russian forces had launched limited cross-border attacks in Sumy Oblast, targeting the villages of Zhuravka, Chuikivka, Rozhkovychi, and Sytne, but all attempts ended in failure. Russian troops raided the village of Ryzhivka in June 2024, located near the border, close to the Russian settlement of Tyotkino. Geolocation footage confirmed that Russian troops had entered the village and advanced approximately 730 meters into Ukraine. However, the next day, Russian forces withdrew from the area.

On 6 August 2024, Ukrainian forces launched an offensive into Russia's Kursk Oblast and occupied part of the region. On 15 August, they captured the town of Sudzha. Around the same time, Ukrainian military commander Oleksandr Syrskyi announced the establishment of a military administration in the occupied areas of Kursk Oblast, which was led by Major General Eduard Moskaliov as the head of the military command office.

On 10 January 2025, Russian troops crossed the international border into Ukraine's Sumy Oblast, advancing west of Zhuravka. However, a few days later, the Ukrainian military claimed their forces had successfully pushed back the Russian attack.

== Incursion ==
On 19 February 2025, Russian President Vladimir Putin announced on a televised broadcast that the 810th Brigade had crossed the border between the Russian Federation and Ukraine, entering Sumy Oblast. However, this claim was denied by the head of Ukraine's Center for Combatting Disinformation, Andriy Kovalenko, as well as senior Ukrainian military officials.

The following day, Russian sources reported that soldiers from the 810th Brigade had successfully entered Basivka, while Ukrainian sources confirmed that Russian forces had stormed the border in the Sumy Oblast. Later, on 25 February, Russian forces again claimed that they had seized Novenke and were making progress toward northern Zhuravka. Meanwhile, the Ukrainian military acknowledged that Russian troops had crossed the border near Novenke but stated that they had successfully pushed them back into Russian territory.

On 28 February 2025, Ukraine's Center for Combatting Disinformation acknowledged that Russian forces were attacking along the international border near Basivka and Novenke. Meanwhile, DeepState described both Basivka and Novenke as "grey zones". By March 2, Russian military bloggers claimed that Russian forces had captured Zhuravka. Around the same time, DeepState reported that Russian troops had broken through near the settlements of Novenke and Zhuravka and were reinforcing their positions. On 7 March 2025, Russian sources claimed that their armed forces had taken over Novenke, and the next day, based on geolocation footage released, it's likely that Russian forces captured Novenke.

After successfully recapturing the town of Sudzha, President Putin proposed establishing a "buffer zone" in Sumy Oblast to protect Kursk from future attacks. Starting on 11 March, Russian forces advanced west of Basivka and southwest of Zhuravka. in an effort to consolidate their positions in the region. A Ukrainian official claimed that Russia was massing troops along the border in preparation for an "assault" on Sumy Oblast.

By 23 March 2025, Russian sources claimed their troops had moved into Volodymyrivka. A few days later, geolocated footage indicated that Russian forces had seized the border checkpoint between Sumy and Sudzha to the east of Basivka. Ukrainian commander Syrskyi said that their forces are conducting a defensive operation to prevent Russian troops from advancing further into the northern Sumy region.

At the end of March 2025, geolocation footage showed that Russian forces captured Veselivka, and the Russian Ministry of Defense also claimed that Russian troops had taken control of Veselivka. However, Ukrainian officials denied the reports of the Russian breakthrough.

On 6 April 2025, footage showed Russian troops advancing south of Basivka. At the same time, Russia's Defense Minister claimed they had already seized Basivka, but Ukrainian officials denied it. Between April 6 and 8, Russian troops made some temporary advances north of Loknya, but failed to secure a foothold and got pushed back by the 4th Special Purpose Regiment.

On 9 April 2025, the Commander-in-Chief of the Armed Forces of Ukraine Oleksandr Syrskyi said that Russia had already started their Spring offensive in northeastern Ukraine (Sumy Oblast). At the same time, Ukraine's President Volodymyr Zelenskyy mentioned that Russia has gathered 67,000 troops ready to be deployed to Sumy. Meanwhile, Ukrainian military observer Kostyantyn Mashovets estimated that around 62,000 to 65,000 Russian soldiers and border guards are currently in Kursk. He also reported that Russia's 76th Airborne Division and the 83rd VDV Brigade captured Basivka.

On 13 April 2025, Russian state media claimed that their forces had seized 70 square kilometers in Sumy Oblast. However, the Institute for the Study of War reported that it could only confirm Russian control over 43.61 square kilometers in the region.

On 24 April 2025, Russian forces were confirmed to have captured Basivka and advanced southwards into northern Loknya. By 8 May, geolocated footage showed that Russian forces have advanced to central Loknya. Russian troops took full control of Loknya by 25 May.

On 26 May 2025, geolocated footage showed that Russian forces seized Bilovody, northeast of Sumy. Two days later, a Russian source claimed that Russian forces seized Kostyantynivka and Vodolahy, north of Sumy City but there was no footage to confirm that. On May 31, the Russian ministry of defense announced that it had taken control of the village of Vodolahy. According to an observer for Bild, with "infantry assaults supported by motorcycles, scooters and aerial attacks, Russian forces captured at least 18 Ukrainian settlements in the final week of May." Ukraine ordered the evacuation of 11 more villages in its Sumy region; a total of 213 settlements in the region had been ordered by the end of May to evacuate.

On 1 June 2025, a Ukrainian source indicated Russian control over the settlements of Oleksiivka, Varachyne, Yablunivka and Novomykolaivka. On June 2, Ukrainian political scientist Viktor Bobyrenko said that Russian forces have taken the village of Kindrativka located south of Kostyantynivka.

On 5 June 2025, Ruslan Mykula, co-founder of the independent Ukrainian intelligence service DeepState UA, said that the main target of the incursion was the strategically important village of Yunakivka. Mykula believed capturing Yunakivka would provide forest cover for Russian infantry and fire control over Sumy city. In the latest report of the war by DeepState, it assessed that Russian forces occupied the villages of Kindrativka and Oleksiivka, making Russian forces within 20 kilometres of Sumy proper and Sumy within range of artillery shelling and Russian FPV drone attacks. DeepState also said that Russia is advancing to Sadky located southeast of Yunakivka for forest cover which "will be extremely difficult to knock it out of there" if Russia succeeds. Ukrainian member of parliament Maryana Bezuglaya and former spokesman for the General Staff of the Armed Forces of Ukraine Vladislav Seleznyov said that all residents of Sumy must either join the defence forces or evacuate the city.

On 7–8 June 2025, Russian forces moved into central Yunakivka. On June 10, Russian forces took the highway in Yunakivka, cutting the town off of supplies and its logistics. DeepStateMap.Live reported that Russian forces were 20 kilometers away from the regional capital of Sumy. On June 22, Ukrainian forces took back Andriivka. However, Russian forces retook the village four days later.

By the end of June 2025, Ukrainian commander Syrskyi claimed that Ukraine halted further Russian advances inside Sumy Oblast.

== Aftermath ==
Beginning on 11–12 July, the 225th Assault Battalion launched an assault to retake the village of Kindrativka from Russian forces. After two days, the regiment had advanced up to 4 kilometers (2.5 miles) and had encircled the 30th and 40th Motorized Rifle Regiments along with the "elite" 155th Naval Infantry Brigade, each of which they claimed had just 300 to 840 men. (Note: Out of an established strength of "around" 2,000.) On 17–18 July, Russian forces unsuccessfully tried to save their trapped forces, which were defeated on 24 July. During the offensive, claimed by Ukraine to be the "most substantial ground force success" since the 2024 Kursk offensive, the Ukrainians claimed to have killed, wounded or captured 700–1,000 Russian troops, including the commander of the 30th Regiment. On 22 July, Ukrainian forces claimed to have retaken the village of Andriivka. Three days later, DeepStateMap.Live reported that Ukrainian forces had completely retaken the village of Kindrativka.

On 5 November 2026, Ukrainian HUR unit, Group 10, claimed to have cleared 642 hectares of Sumy Oblast of Russian forces in the autumn of 2026. During the two stage offensive, codenamed Operation Cheburechna, they claimed to have killed 107 Russian troops, wounded 157 and captured 29. 61 drone launching sites, 31 artillery systems and 368 vehicles were also claimed to have been destroyed.

== Opposing forces ==
=== Russia ===
The 810th Naval Infantry Brigade was the first Russian unit known to have entered the Sumy Oblast when it was reported in mid-February that some of its units had crossed the border and entered the village of Basivka. Amid their operations in Sumy Oblast throughout February and March, other elements of the 810th Brigade have remained in the area of Guyevo, Plekhovo, and Kurilovka in the Kursk Oblast.

By early March, it was widely reported that the 83rd Air Assault Brigade, which had taken the Russian border village of Nikolayevo-Darino in January, was operating around the neighboring village of Zhuravka in Sumy Oblast, where it remained throughout the month. On April 5, it was reported that the "Tigers" drone detachment of the brigade were using fibre optic FPV drones at the Kursk-Sumy border.

By 22 February, it had been reported that the 56th Air Assault Regiment was operating near the border village of Novenke, in Sumy Oblast. Throughout March 2025, it was reported that units of the regiment, including its drone units, were operating within Sumy Oblast and along the international border.

By late March, it was reported that the 51st Airborne Regiment, which had been located in the Russian border villages of Sverdlikovo and Lebedevka the previous month, had taken control of most of Basivka and was present near the Sudzha border post.

It was reported in late March that elements of the 34th Mountain Motor Rifle Brigade had advanced near the Ukrainian border village of Veselivka, after having taken part in an operation to capture the village of Malaya Loknya in Kursk Oblast earlier in the month.

In late June, The Wall Street Journal cited that Russian forces present at Sumy front totalled 50,000 with Ukrainian forces being one third of that number.

ISW reported in August 2025 that the 1434th Akhmat-Chechnya Regiment, the 40th Naval Infantry Brigade, the BARS-25 Anvar volunteer detachment and the 1st Infantry Battalion of the 137th Guards Airborne Regiment was operating in Sumy Oblast.

=== Ukraine ===
Units of Ukraine's 36th Marine Brigade repelled a Russian assault (which they claimed involved North Korean forces) between Sverdlikovo and Novenke in mid-March 2025. The 36th Brigade was still in defense of the border villages of Sumy Oblast by the end of March 2025.

By late March, the 103rd Territorial Defense Brigade was operating in a border village in Sumy Oblast.

Ukraine's 78th Airborne Assault Regiment repelled a Russian attempt to cross the state border near the village of Zhuravka in February 2025.

Throughout March, the 15th Mobile Border Detachment of Ukraine's State Border Guard Service engaged in combat with Russian forces on the border of the Sumy Oblast.

On March 21, the Ukrainian media outlet Ukrainska Pravda interviewed soldiers from the 67th Mechanized Brigade who had been deployed to defend the villages of Zhuravka, Novenke, and the surrounding area of Basivka.

On 4 April, soldiers from the Izmail Border Detachment of Ukraine's State Border Guard Service caught a lost Russian soldier who was delivering food supplies to his unit.

On 6 April, the 4th Special Purpose Regiment pushed back Russian troops who tried to attack Loknya.

== Casualties ==
=== Civilian casualties ===
On 12 March, Russia carried out mortar and artillery attacks on the Myropillia hromada, injuring an adult man.

On 22 March, Ukrainian media reported that the Ukraine's State Emergency Service evacuated 31 people—including three children—from the border area of Sumy Oblast. On 30 March, while Ukraine's State Emergency Service was evacuating civilians from the Sumy border region, Russian forces launched an attack in the area, leaving one man injured.

On 12 April, during an interview with Ukrainian media, Volodymyr Artiukh, head of the Sumy Regional Military Administration, said that 15,000 people had been evacuated from the Krasnopillia, Myropillia, Yunakivka, and Khotin communities.

On 8 May 2025, Russia reportedly violated its own ceasefire for Victory Day when Russian forces dropped guided bombs on residential areas near the border in Sumy Oblast leaving 1 person dead and 2 wounded.

On 21 December 2025, Ukrainian ombudsman Dmytro Lubinets claimed that Russian soldiers had detained and forcibly moved about 50 people from the village of Hrabovske, Sumy Oblast to Russia.

=== Military casualties ===
==== Russian ====
On 12 March, the spokesperson for the State Border Guard Service, Andrii Demchenko, claimed that around 20 Russian soldiers were killed near the border area, while approximately 15 others were wounded.

On 4 April, soldiers from the Izmail detachment of Ukraine's State Border Guard Service captured a Russian soldier. On 8 April, Rangers from the 4th Regiment of Ukraine's Armed Forces Special Operations Forces grabbed another Russian soldier while clearing the settlement of Loknya.

On 17 July, a Ukrainian press service reported that the Black Swan regiment claimed the scalp of commander of the 30th motorized rifle regiment, Major Andrii Yartsev.

On 31 July, the ISW, citing a Russian milblogger associated with Russia's Northern Grouping of Forces, reported that only 140 personnel had survived of 2,200 total personnel in the 30th Motorized Rifle Regiment "attritional, casualty-heavy infantry assaults", which led to accusations of "criminal behavior" for the regimental commanders.

On 14 April 2026, Ukrainian military claimed that it had intercepted Russian forces trying to infiltrate Ukrainian rear positions in Sumy Oblast using gas pipelines and that 29 Russian soldiers had been killed.

==== Ukrainian ====
On 7 June 2025, Yaroslav Yakimkin, head of the press center for the Russian Northern Group, claimed that 255 Ukrainian soldiers had become casualties while Ukrainian forces also lost 4 combat vehicles, 14 vehicles, 3 field guns, 1 electronic warfare station, and 1 ammunition depot.

On 21 January 2026, the State Investigation Bureau arrested a Ukrainian military officer in Sumy Oblast on "suspicion of abusing and torturing subordinates" and threatening to shoot soldiers who failed to follow his orders.

== Analysis ==
When soldiers from the 67th Mechanized Brigade, stationed to defend the villages of Zhuravka, Novenke, and the area around Basivka, were interviewed by Ukrainska Pravda on March 21, they shared their views on the current situation. They believe that the primary objective of Russia's operations in the Sumy Oblast is to push Ukrainian forces back from the Kursk Oblast and, more importantly, to cut off access to the main logistical route connecting Sumy, Yunakivka, and Sudzha. According to them, a large-scale assault on the Sumy Oblast—particularly from the direction of Basivka, where Ukrainian defenses have been fortified—is not necessarily the main scenario Russia is pursuing on that front.

According to Ukrainian People's Deputy Roman Kostenko, the Russian incursion into Sumy Oblast was improvised rather than part of a premeditated strategic plan. Kostenko stated that Ukrainian forces had expected to hold their defensive positions in Kursk, believing Russian troops would be directed toward Pokrovsk instead. However, this expectation was upended at the last moment. "Something happened that was not planned. No one planned that they would now withdraw (the Ukrainian Armed Forces from Kursk – ed.), and the enemy would advance. This decided the battlefield. If there was an opportunity to hold the battlefield in the direction of Kursk, we would have held it, but, unfortunately, we could not," says Kostenko.

Analysts have noted that the Russian advance in Sumy Oblast differs in both pace and character from other fronts. Retired Ukrainian major Ihor Lapin and political analyst Viktor Bobyrenko, head of the Expert Group at the Bureau of Policy Analysis, observed that Russian troops—despite a reported force of 50,000 near the Kursk border—are advancing in small infantry groups, often using motorcycles. This tactic is considered effective in the Sumy region due to the area's dense forests, wetlands, and other natural obstacles that limit the utility of heavy armored vehicles and heavy equipment.

Bobyrenko desbribed the situation: "It is clear that tanks will not pass here, this is an infantry war, DRG. If the enemy crosses the highway and enters the forest zone, not just forest belts like in the east, but classic forests, then the problem will be that this is solid greenery, and we will not be able to drive them away with drones. The enemy from the northeast reached the outskirts of Yunakivka, and from the northwest - already in Kindrativka, respectively, there are 10 km left to Khotin, where there are forests. In Sumy region, the number of forests is greater than near Pokrovsk or somewhere in the Zaporizhia direction, so for the summer offensive of the invader this may be an advantage, because here the most effective technical means is a moped or feet."

== See also ==
- List of military engagements during the Russo-Ukrainian war (2022–present)
- Kupiansk offensive
- Novopavlivka offensive
- Battle of Chasiv Yar
- Battle of Toretsk
