= Yablunivka, Sumy Oblast =

Village in Sumy Oblast, Ukraine

Yablunivka Яблунівка
- Village
- Interactive map of Yablunivka
- Location of Yablunivka Yablunivka (Ukraine)
- Coordinates: 51°8′21″N 34°58′22″E
- Country: Ukraine
- Oblast: Sumy Oblast
- Raion: Sumy Raion
- Hromada: Yunakivka rural hromada
- Elevation: 212 m (696 ft)

Population (2001)
  - Total: 168
- Time zone: UTC+2
  - Summer (DST): UTC+3
- Postal code: 42335
- Area code: +380 542

Yablunivka is a village in Ukraine, in Yunakivka rural hromada, Sumy Raion, Sumy Oblast. Until 2020, the local government body was Kyianytsia Village Council.

== Geography ==
The village of Yablunivka is located near the sources of the Snagist River. At a distance of up to 3 km are the villages of Bilovody, Yunakivka and the village of Varachyne. The H07 highway passes nearby.

== History ==
Until 2016, the village was called Chervonopraporne.

On June 12, 2020, in accordance with the Resolution of the Cabinet of Ministers of Ukraine No. 723-r "On the Determination of Administrative Centers and Approval of Territories of Territorial Communities of Sumy Region", it became part of the Yunakivka rural hromada.

On July 19, 2020, as a result of the administrative-territorial reform and liquidation of the Sumy Raion (1923—2020), the village became part of the newly formed Sumy Raion.

During the Russo-Ukrainian War, Russian forces first reached the village on 7 June 2025. Russian forces captured the village on 20 July 2025.

== Demographics ==
According to the 2001 Ukrainian census, the village's population was 168 people. The main languages of the village were:

- Ukrainian 84.52%
- Russian 7.74%
- Belarusian 5.36%
- Other/not specified 2.38%
