= Nova Sich, Sumy Oblast =

Village in Sumy Oblast, Ukraine

Nova Sich Нова Січ
- Village
- Interactive map of Nova Sich
- Location of Nova Sich Nova Sich (Ukraine)
- Coordinates: 51°5′8″N 34°55′10″E
- Country: Ukraine
- Oblast: Sumy Oblast
- Raion: Sumy Raion
- Hromada: Yunakivka rural hromada
- Elevation: 176 m (577 ft)

Population (2001)
  - Total: 378
- Time zone: UTC+2
  - Summer (DST): UTC+3
- Postal code: 42335
- Area code: +380 542

Nova Sich is a village in Ukraine, in Yunakivka rural hromada, Sumy Raion, Sumy Oblast. Until 2016, the local government body was Kyianytsia Village Council.

== Geography ==
The village of Nova Sich is located at one of the sources of the Oleshnia River, downstream at a distance of 1 km is the village of Kyianytsia. At a distance of up to 1 km are the villages of Korchakivka and Khrapivshchyna. Nearby is the H07 highway.

== History ==
On June 12, 2020, in accordance with the Resolution of the Cabinet of Ministers of Ukraine No. 723-r "On the Determination of Administrative Centers and Approval of Territories of Territorial Communities of Sumy Region", it became part of the Yunakivka rural hromada.

On July 19, 2020, as a result of the administrative-territorial reform and liquidation of the Sumy Raion (1923—2020), the community joined the newly formed Sumy Raion.

On February 23, 2023, by decision No. 4 of the Yunakivka Village Council "On renaming streets and alleys in settlements of the Yunakivka Rural Territorial Community", it was decided to rename the street in Varachyne without changing the numbering of buildings from Gagarina Street to Horikhova Street.

=== Russo-Ukrainian War ===
On February 26, 2024, Russian ammunition hit the homes of civilians. Five homes were completely destroyed, and several more had their windows damaged. A retired couple died. On June 30, 2024, the Operational Command North reported another shelling of the village. 8 explosions were recorded, probably from 122 mm artillery. On August 7, 2024, the village was subjected to air, missile, and artillery strikes by Russian forces.

Russian forces first entered the village on 24 June 2026.

== Population ==
According to data for 1864, the village of Vlasnytsia in the Sumsky Uyezd of the Kharkov Governorate had a population of 499 people (248 men and 251 females), which includes 89 households.

As of 1885, the former private village of Pysarivska Volost had a population of 1,047 people, 130 households, and a shop.

According to the 1897 census, the number of residents increased to 1,117 people (555 males and 562 females), of whom 1,116 were of the Orthodox faith.

As of 1914, the village belonged to the Pysarivska Volost, and the number of residents had increased to 1,292 people.

According to the 2001 Ukrainian census, the village's population was 378 people. The main languages of the village were:

- Ukrainian 93.03%
- Russian 6.43%
- Belarusian 0.54%

As of 2025, the population of Nova Sich was 27 people.

== Notable people ==
The following were born in the village:

- Leonid Sukhodub — A Doctor of Physical and Mathematical Sciences, Corresponding Member of the National Academy of Sciences of Ukraine, Professor, Head of the Department of Biophysics, Biochemistry, Pharmacology and Bimolecular Engineering of the Medical Institute of Sumy State University.
