= Loknia, Sumy Raion =

Village in Sumy Oblast, Ukraine

Loknia Локня
- Village
- Coat of arms
- Interactive map of Loknia
- Location of Loknya Loknia (Ukraine)
- Coordinates: 51°8′52″N 35°03′32″E
- Country: Ukraine
- Oblast: Sumy Oblast
- Raion: Sumy Raion
- Hromada: Yunakivka rural hromada
- Elevation: 167 m (548 ft)

Population (2001)
  - Total: 368
- Time zone: UTC+2
  - Summer (DST): UTC+3
- Postal code: 42313
- Area code: +380 542

Loknia (Ukrainian: Локня) is a village in Yunakivka rural hromada, Sumy Raion, Sumy Oblast, Ukraine. Until 2020, the local government body was the Basivka Village Council. The village is currently occupied by Russian forces during the 2025 Sumy Oblast incursion of the Russo-Ukrainian War.

The word Loknia in ancient times meant "meadow above the river".

== Geography ==
The village of Loknia lies on the banks of the Loknia River, upstream the village of Yunakivka adjoins it and the village of Basivka downstream at a distance of 2 km. The H07 highway passes nearby.

== History ==
On June 12, 2020, in accordance with the Resolution of the Cabinet of Ministers of Ukraine No. 723-r "On the Determination of Administrative Centers and Approval of Territories of Territorial Communities of Sumy Region", it became part of the Yunakivka rural hromada. On July 19, 2020, as a result of the administrative-territorial reform and liquidation of the Sumy Raion (1923–2020), the community joined the newly formed Sumy Raion.

On February 23, 2023, by decision No. 4 of the Yunakivka Village Council "On renaming streets and alleys in settlements of the Yunakivka Rural Territorial Hromada", it was decided to rename the street in Loknia without changing the numbering of buildings from Kyrychenko Street to Vyshneva Street.

=== Russo-Ukrainian War ===
On May 24, 2024, 5 explosions were recorded in the village from Russian forces, probably 122 mm artillery.

On July 28, 2024, the village was shelled by Russian forces. 1 explosion was recorded, probably an FPV drone.

On August 3, 2024, Russian troops again shelled the village. Two explosions were recorded, probably KAB.

On August 11, 2024, the village was once again shelled by Russian forces. According to the Operational Command North, 1 explosion was recorded, probably a KAB.

Russian forces first entered the village on 24 April 2025 during the 2025 Sumy Oblast incursion. Russian forces captured the village by 1 July 2025.

== Population ==
According to the 2001 Ukrainian census, the village's population was 368 people. The main languages of the village were:

- Ukrainian 95.97%
- Russian 3.76%
- Belarusian 0.27%

== People ==
The following were born in the village:

- Mykhailo Pavlovich Karnaushenko - Hero of the Soviet Union.
- Oleksiy Petrovich Kyrychenko (1894–1941) - Hero of the Soviet Union.
- Volodymyr Yukhymovych Holubchenko (1894–1941) - A Ukrainian teacher and local historian.

== Attractions ==
Grave of Junior Lieutenant Ogorodnikov Ivan Onufriyovych (1923-8.3.1943) with a monument. Located in front of the village club. The burial is supervised by students of Basivka secondary school. There is also a memorial for the Holodomor located in the village.
