= Kyianytsia =

Village in Sumy Oblast, Ukraine

Kyianytsia Кияниця
- Rural settlement
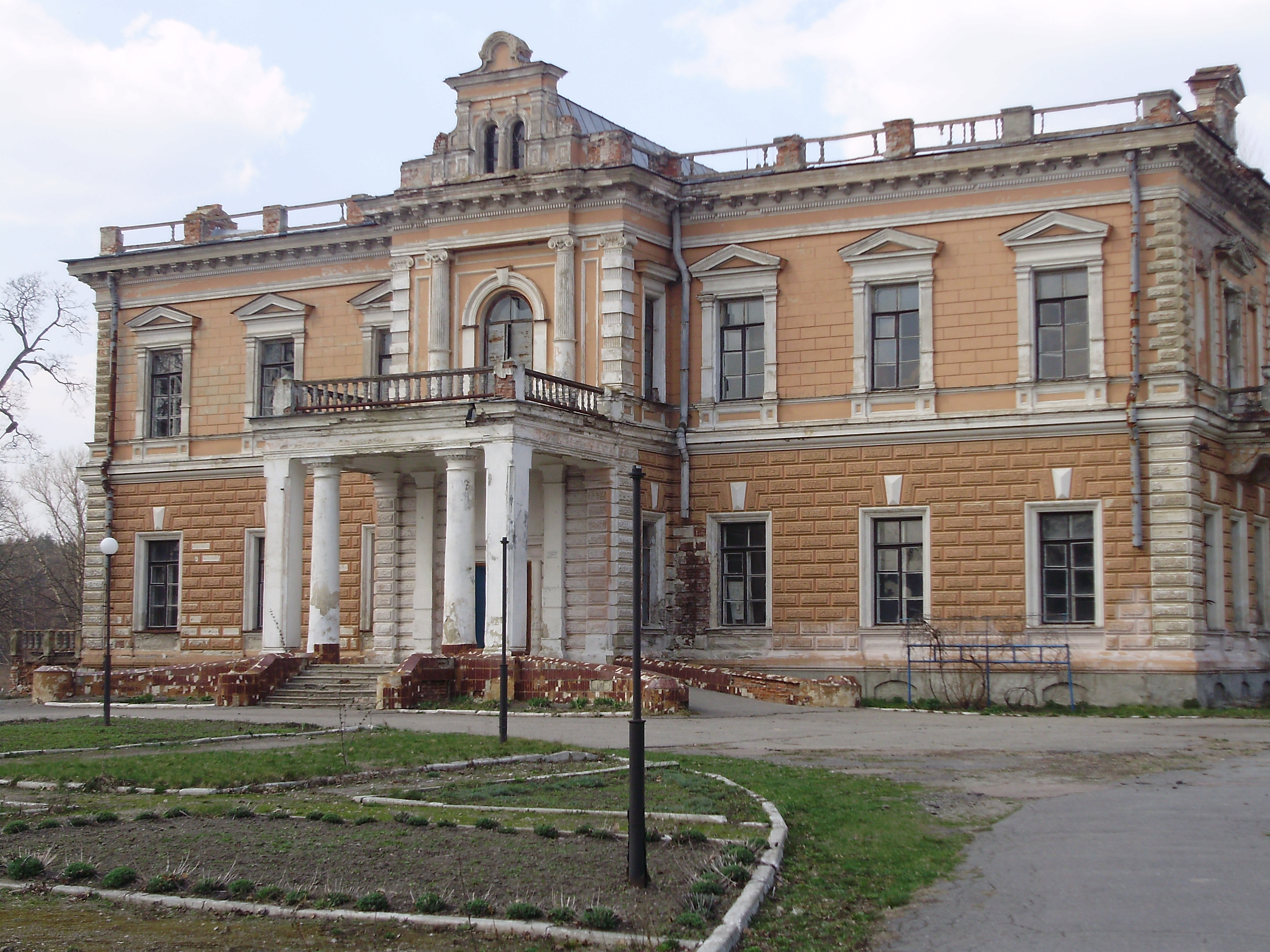
- Façade of the Kharytonenko Palace
- Interactive map of Kyianytsia
- Location of Kyianytsia Kyianytsia (Ukraine)
- Coordinates: 51°4′3″N 34°55′10″E
- Country: Ukraine
- Oblast: Sumy Oblast
- Raion: Sumy Raion
- Hromada: Yunakivka rural hromada
- Elevation: 186 m (610 ft)

Population (2001)
  - Total: 694
- Time zone: UTC+2
  - Summer (DST): UTC+3
- Postal code: 42335
- Area code: +380 542

Kyianytsia (Ukrainian: Кияниця) is a rural settlement in Yunakivka rural hromada, Sumy Raion, Sumy Oblast, Ukraine. Until 2020, the local government body was the Kyianytsia Village Council.

== Geography ==
The rural settlement of Kyianytsia is located on the left bank of the Oleshnia River, upstream at a distance of 1 km is the village of Nova Sich, downstream at a distance of 1.5 km is the village of Ivolzhanske. There is a large ravine on the river. The settlement is adjacent to a large forest massif – the Nimenkovshchyna Polyana tract (oak). The H07 highway passes through the settlement.

== History ==
On June 12, 2020, in accordance with the Resolution of the Cabinet of Ministers of Ukraine No. 723-r "On the Determination of Administrative Centers and Approval of Territories of Territorial Communities of Sumy Region", it became part of the Yunakivka rural hromada.

On July 19, 2020, as a result of the administrative-territorial reform and liquidation of the Sumy Raion (1923–2020), the community joined the newly formed Sumy Raion.

On February 23, 2023, by decision No. 4 of the Yunakivka Village Council "On renaming streets and alleys in settlements of the Yunakivka Rural Territorial Hromada decided to rename the street in Kyianytsia without changing the numbering of buildings from Pershotravneva Street to Travneva Street.

On October 18, 2023, the palace and park in Kyianytsia, which were constructed in the late 19th century, were inscribed on the State Register of Immovable Monuments as a monument of national significance with the protection number 180061.

=== Russo-Ukrainian War ===
On October 2, 2022, Russian troops shelled the settlements of Kyianytsia and Basivka. Poultry in the yard was killed, a barn was burned, houses and a local school were damaged.

On January 2, 2024, a Russian shell hit a retirement home in the settlement. The couple survived, but suffered concussions. According to the regional administration, Kyianytsia was shelled with Grad missiles, with a total of 5 explosions recorded.

On August 7, 2024, the settlement was subjected to air, missile, and artillery strikes by Russian forces.

On August 10, 2024, Kyianytsia again came under Russian attacks. According to the Operational Command North, 1 explosion was recorded, probably a KAB.

On August 11, 2024, the settlement was once again shelled by Russian forces. According to the Operational Command North, 2 explosions were recorded, probably KAB.

On August 17, 2024, the Operational Command North reported shelling of Sumy Oblast. Among the affected settlements was Kyianytsia – 2 explosions, probably KAB. By 9 October 2026, the village was captured by Russian forces.

== Population ==
According to data from 1864, the village of Vlasnytsia in the Sumsky Uyezd of the Kharkov Governorate had a population of 155 people (76 men and 79 women), 14 household farms, and a distillery.

According to the 2001 Ukrainian census, the settlement's population was 694 people. The largest native languages of Kyianytsia were:

- Ukrainian 92.41%
- Russian 6.73%
- Belarusian 0.43%
- Other/Not specific 0.43%

By 2025, the population of the rural settlement was around 20 people.

== Notable people ==
The following were born in Kyianytsia:

- Ivan Kharytonenko (1822–1891) – a Ukrainian landowner, sugar industrialist, philanthropist and patron of the arts.
- Gennady Vasko (1941–2006) – a Soviet and Ukrainian opera singer, Honored Artist of the Tatar ASSR.
- Oleg Fedyna (1979–2023) – a Senior Lieutenant of the Armed Forces of Ukraine, participant in the Russo-Ukrainian war, volunteer.

== Gallery ==
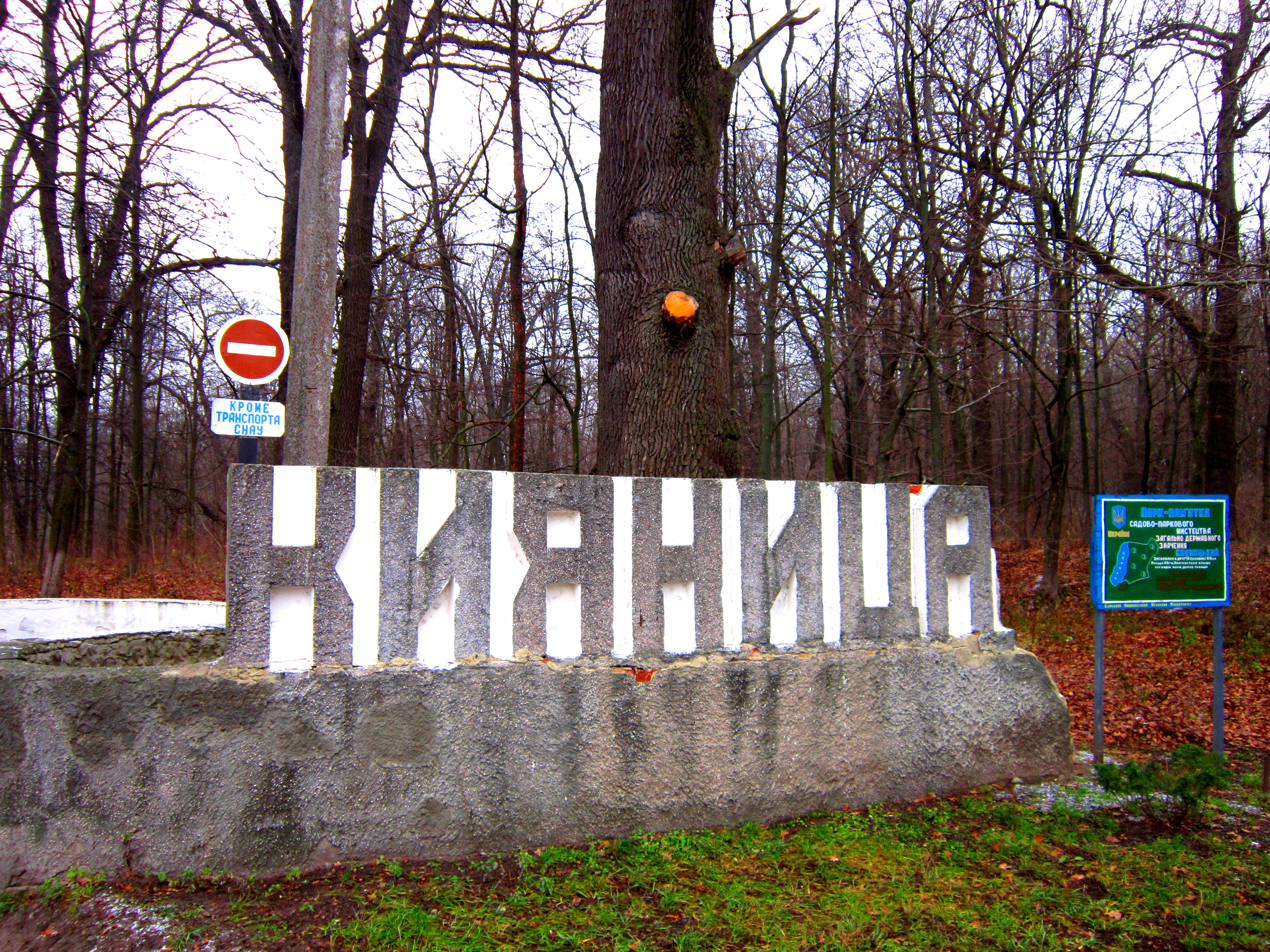
Stele in front of the entrance to the landscape park

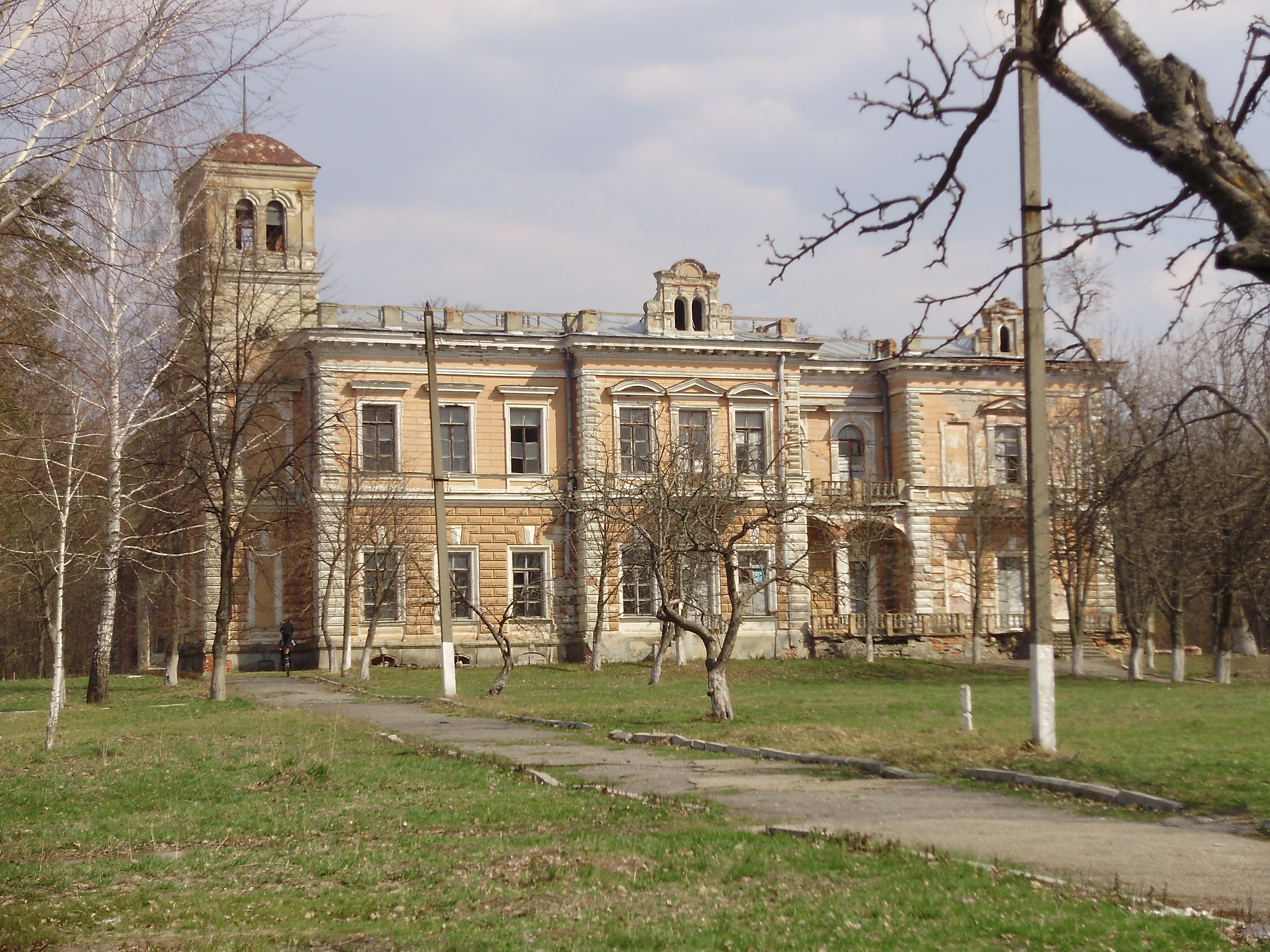
View of Kharytonenko Palace

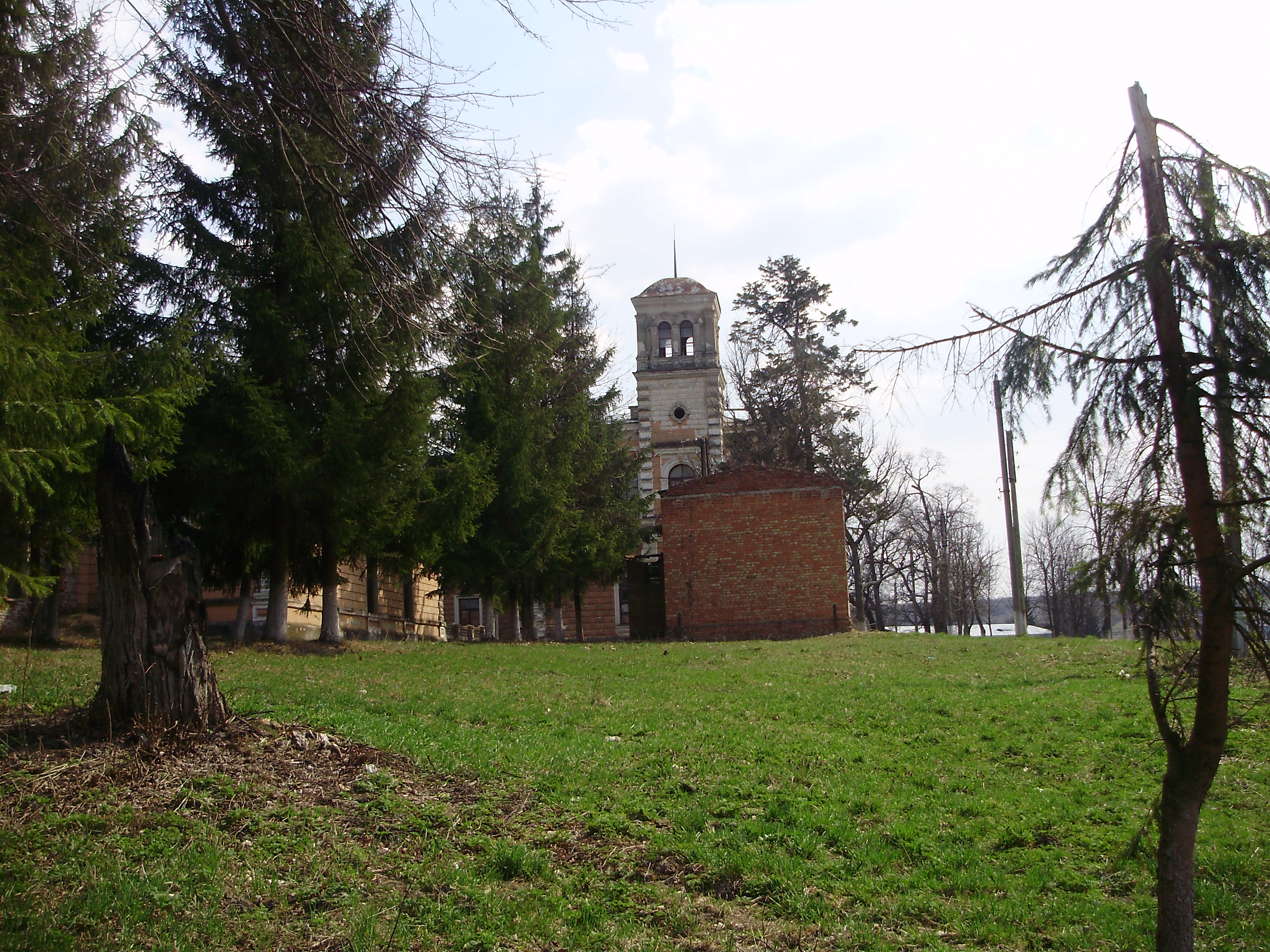
Historical and Architectural Park built at the end of the 19th century
