= Ivolzhanske =

Village in Sumy Oblast, Ukraine

Ivolzhanske Іволжанське
- Rural settlement
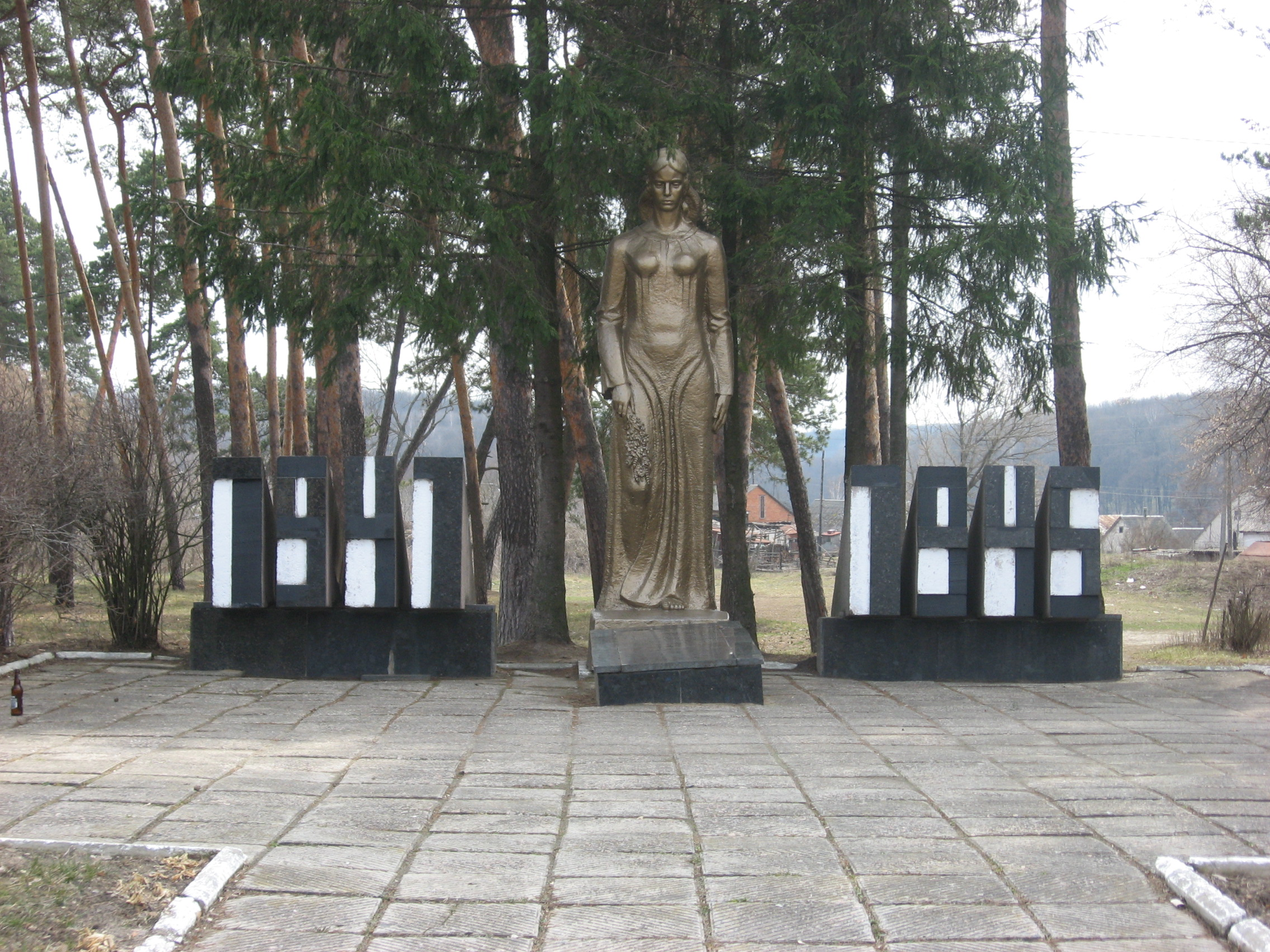
- War memorial to those who fell during World War II
- Interactive map of Ivolzhanske
- Location of Ivolzhanske Ivolzhanske (Ukraine)
- Coordinates: 51°4′10″N 34°52′38″E
- Country: Ukraine
- Oblast: Sumy Oblast
- Raion: Sumy Raion
- Hromada: Yunakivka rural hromada
- Elevation: 182 m (597 ft)

Population (2001)
  - Total: 226
- Time zone: UTC+2
  - Summer (DST): UTC+3
- Postal code: 42335
- Area code: +380 542

Ivolzhanske is a rural settlement in Yunakivka rural hromada, Sumy Raion, Sumy Oblast, Ukraine. Until 2020, the local government body was the Kyianytsia Village Council.

== Geography ==
The village of Ivolzhanske is located 25 km from Sumy in the direction of Kursk and on the Oleshnia River. Upstream, 2 km away, lies the village of Kyianytsia, and downstream, 2 km away, lies the village of Pysarivka. The village is surrounded by a forest massif (oak, as well as maple and pine, predominate). Nearby is the national highway H07 (Kyiv-Sumy-Yunakivka).

== History ==
On June 12, 2020, in accordance with the Resolution of the Cabinet of Ministers of Ukraine No. 723-r "On the Determination of Administrative Centers and Approval of Territories of Territorial Hromadas of Sumy Oblast", it became part of the Yunakivka rural hromada.

On July 19, 2020, as a result of the administrative-territorial reform and liquidation of the Sumy Raion (1923–2020), the village became part of the newly formed Sumy Raion.

=== Russo-Ukrainian War ===
On August 14, 2024, the Operational Command North reported that Russian forces shelled Sumy Oblast. One explosion was recorded in the village, probably a KAB.

On July 27, 2025, at about 4:30 p.m., Russian forces attacked a UAV with a regular bus near the settlement, with the bus moving civilians through the territory of the Yunakivka rural hromada. Three civilians were killed, and about 20 more passengers were injured to varying degrees. Russian forces first entered the village on 21 May 2026. By 24 June 2026, Russian forces captured the village.

== Population ==
According to the 2001 Ukrainian census, the village's population was 60 people. The main languages of the village were:

- Ukrainian 87.45%
- Russian 12.55%

== Economy ==
- LLC "Plant "Eco-Product"" is an enterprise founded in 1997 on the site of a former distillery. It produces table mineral water "Ivolzhanska", still drinking purified water "Ivolzhanske-1", carbonated sweet drinks, as well as beer "Tovarish" (aged in oak barrels), "Ivolzhanske" and "EKO".
- Paid fishing on the pond.
