= Zhuravka, Sumy Raion =

Village in Sumy Oblast, Ukraine

Zhuravka Журавка
- Village
- Interactive map of Zhuravka
- Location of Zhuravka Zhuravka (Ukraine)
- Coordinates: 51°13′11″N 34°59′3″E
- Country: Ukraine
- Oblast: Sumy Oblast
- Raion: Sumy Raion
- Hromada: Khotin settlement hromada
- Elevation: 163 m (535 ft)

Population (2001)
  - Total: 162
- Time zone: UTC+2
  - Summer (DST): UTC+3
- Postal code: 42310
- Area code: +380 542

Zhuravka is a village in Ukraine, in Khotin settlement hromada, Sumy Raion, Sumy Oblast. Until 2020, the local government body was the Bilovody Village Council. The village is currently occupied by Russian forces during the 2025 Sumy Oblast incursion of the Russo-Ukrainian War.

== Geography ==
The village of Zhuravka is located on the banks of the Snagist River, upstream at a distance of 2.5 km is the village of Bilovody, downstream is the village of Nikolayevo-Darino (Kursk Oblast). The village is located on the border with Russia.

== History ==
On June 12, 2020, in accordance with the Resolution of the Cabinet of Ministers of Ukraine No. 723-r "On the Determination of Administrative Centers and Approval of Territories of Territorial Communities of Sumy Region", it became part of the Khotin settlement hromada. On July 19, 2020, as a result of the administrative-territorial reform and liquidation of the Sumy Raion (1923—2020), the community joined the newly formed Sumy Raion.

=== Russo-Ukrainian War ===
On November 13, 2022, the Russians shelled the village with mortars. As a result, farmsteads were damaged and agricultural machinery was destroyed. In March 2023, as a result of systematic shelling by Russian forces, the settlement remained outside the logistical routes.

On May 1, 2024, the population of Vodolahy, Zhuravka and Bilovody was evacuated. Halyna Mishchenko and her 95-year-old mother were forced to leave their home. The woman says that their village of Zhuravka, where they lived, is shelled daily. On June 2, 2024, a 62-year-old tractor driver was blown up by a mine in the village. The man died in the hospital. This was reported by the Sumy Regional Prosecutor's Office. The village resident was mowing grass on a tractor and hit a mine. The injured man was found by his son and taken to a hospital in Sumy. The man had multiple injuries, from which he died from.

On July 19, 2024, Russian troops shelled the village. Six explosions were recorded, probably from a helicopter. On August 3, 2024, Russian troops shelled the village again. 5 explosions were recorded, probably from an 82 mm mortar. On August 7, 2024, the village was subjected to air, missile, and artillery strikes by Russian forces.

Russian forces first entered the village on 21 March 2025 during the 2025 Sumy offensive. Russian forces captured the village by 26 April 2025.

== Population ==
According to the 2001 Ukrainian census, the village's population was 163 people. The main languages of the village were:

- Ukrainian 88.61%
- Russian 10.76%
- Belarusian 0.63%

== People ==
The following were born in the village:

- Zamula Vasyl Nikiforovych - A Ukrainian Soviet figure.
