= 4th Special Purpose Regiment (Ukraine) =

4th Special Purpose Regiment, KRoSSO
- 4-й Полк спеціального призначення Корпусу Рейнджерів ССО
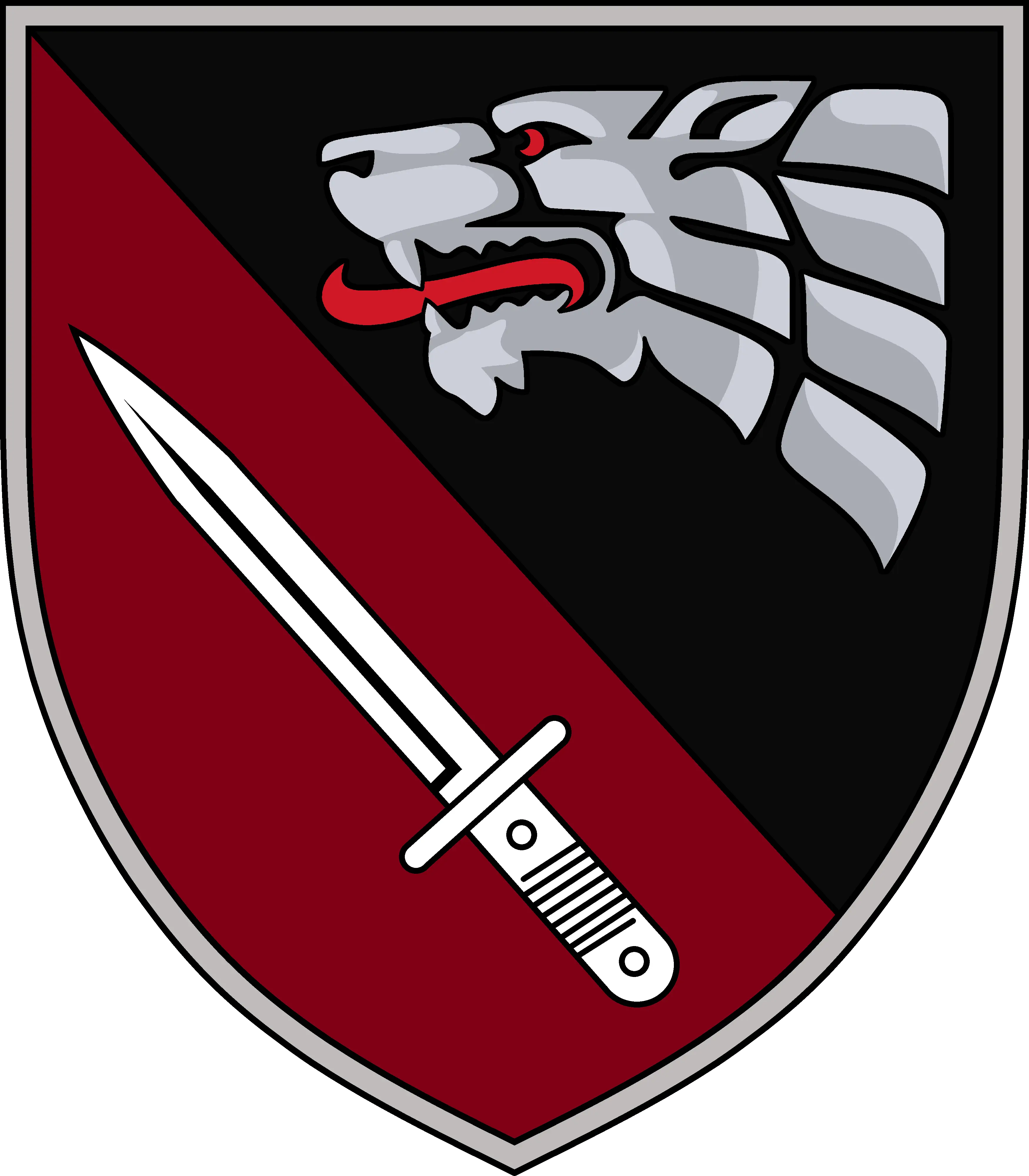
- Regiment Insignia
- Active: 2024 – Present
- Country: Ukraine
- Allegiance: Ukrainian Ground Forces
- Branch: Ranger Corps
- Type: Regiment
- Role: Special operations
- Part of: Ukrainian Special Operations Forces
- Engagements: Russo-Ukrainian war: Russian Invasion of Ukraine; 2024 Kursk offensive; 2025 Sumy Obl. incursion

Commanders
- Current commander: Lt. Col. Ihor Shtanko

Insignia
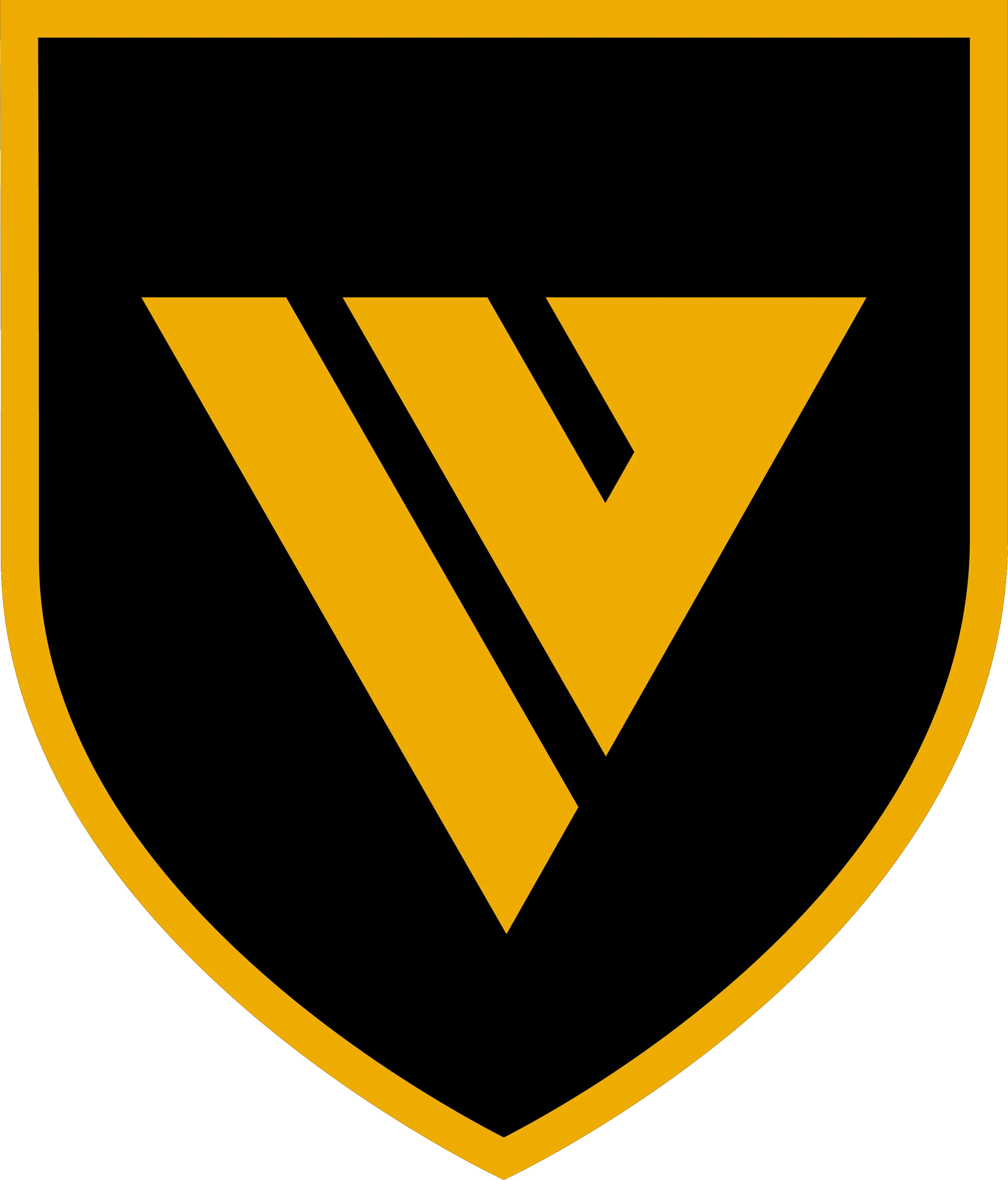
- Former Insignia

The 4th Special Purpose Regiment, Ranger Corps (Ukrainian: 4-й Полк спеціального призначення Корпусу Рейнджерів ССО (КРССО), romanized: 4th Polk spetsial'noho pryznachennya Korpusu Reyndzheriv, (KRoSSO); MUN A5011) is a Ukrainian special forces regiment that was formed in 2024 as part of the Ukrainian Ranger Corps.

== History ==
The regiment has taken part in the 2024 Kursk offensive. A soldier of the Regiment (Tatsenko Oleksandr Romanovich) was killed in Kursk Oblast in October 2024. On 25 November 2024, the regiment ambushed a Russian Desertcross 1000-3 vehicle carrying six soldiers using live fire and kamikaze drones, all the Russian personnel were killed. A soldier of the regiment (Andriy Soroka) was killed in action on 9 December 2024. In February 2025, a special Tank unit was established as a part of the regiment which was equipped with T-64BV and T-72AV tanks. On 6 April 2025, the Regiment pushed back Russian troops who tried to attack Loknya as part of the 2025 Sumy Oblast incursion.

== Equipment ==
Type	Image	Origin	Class	Notes
Assault Rifles
AKM		Soviet Union	7.62×39mm Assault Rifle	
AK-74		Soviet Union	5.45×39mm Assault Rifle	
M4A1		United States	5.56×45mm NATO Assault Rifle	
DDM4		United States	5.56×45mm NATO Assault Rifle	
Marksmen Rifles
Savage Arms		United States	Bolt action rifle	
Barrett MRAD		United States	Bolt action Sniper rifle	
Grenade Launchers
Mk 19 grenade launcher		United States	40 mm belt-fed automatic grenade launcher	
Tanks
T-64BV		Soviet Union	Main battle tank	
T-72AV		Soviet Union	Main battle tank	
Vehicles
BMP-1		Soviet Union	Amphibious tracked infantry fighting vehicle	
Kozak-5		Ukraine	Infantry mobility vehicle with MRAP capabilities	
Humvee		United States	Infantry mobility vehicle	
Artillery
152 mm gun-howitzer D-20		Soviet Union	152 mm gun-howitzer artillery	
UAVs
DJI Mavic		China	FPV drone	

== Command ==
- Lieutenant Colonel Ihor Shtanko

== Structure ==
- Management & Headquarters
- 1st Special Detachment
- 2nd Special Detachment
- Tank Company
- Commandant Platoon
