= Novenke, Sumy Oblast =

Novenke Новеньке
- Village
- Interactive map of Novenke
- Location of Novenke within Ukraine Novenke (Sumy Oblast)
- Coordinates: 51°13′9″N 35°6′13″E
- Country: Ukraine
- Oblast: Sumy Oblast
- Raion: Sumy Raion
- Hromada: Yunakivka rural hromada
- Elevation: 162 m (531 ft)

Population (2001 census)
  - Total: 15
- Time zone: UTC+2 (EET)
  - Summer (DST): UTC+3 (EEST)
- Postal code: 42312
- Area code: +380 542

Novenke (Ukrainian: Новеньке) is a village in Yunakivka rural hromada, Sumy Raion, Sumy Oblast in Northern Ukraine. According to the 2001 census, the population was 15 people, but by 2023, only 3 residents remained in the village. In 2025, Russia captured the village through a cross-border offensive.

== Geography ==
The village is located on the left side of the Loknya (Sudzha tributary). Upstream, about 2 km south, is Basivka, and downstream, around 1.5 km north, is Sverdlikovo (in Kursk Oblast). The village is right on the border with Russia.

== History ==
On June 12, 2020, following the order of the Cabinet of Ministers of Ukraine No. 723-r "About Determining the Administrative Center and Approving the Territories of the Territorial Communities of Sumy Oblast," this village became part of the Yunakivka rural hromada.

On July 19, 2020, as a result of the administrative-territorial reform and the liquidation of the Sumy District (1923–2020), this village was included in the newly formed Sumy Raion.

=== Russian invasion of Ukraine ===
As of February 28, 2025, according to data from DeepState and the Institute for the Study of War, this area is in what's called the "gray zone". According to Andriy Kovalenko, head of the Center for Countering Disinformation, Russian forces tried to attack the village of Novenke along the border line, but without vehicle columns, just with infantry groups. On the other hand, the Armed Forces of Ukraine destroyed the enemy.

According to info from "Kordon Media," citing Ukrainian military sources directly in the Kursk operation zone, the area around Novenke is militarily important for Russia, because it would allow Russian forces to interfere with the logistics of Ukrainian forces in the Kursk region, due to proximity to a major Ukrainian logistics artery.

On March 7, 2025, Russian sources claimed that their armed forces had taken over the village, and the next day, based on geolocation footage released, it’s likely that Russian forces captured Novenke.
