= Sadky, Sumy Raion =

Village in Sumy Oblast, Ukraine

Sadky Садки
- Village
- Interactive map of Sadky
- Location of Sadky Sadky (Ukraine)
- Coordinates: 51°5′50″N 35°5′41″E
- Country: Ukraine
- Oblast: Sumy Oblast
- Raion: Sumy Raion
- Hromada: Yunakivka rural hromada
- Elevation: 217 m (712 ft)

Population (2001)
  - Total: 7
- Time zone: UTC+2
  - Summer (DST): UTC+3
- Postal code: 42317
- Area code: +380 542

Sadky (Ukrainian: Садки) is a village in Ukraine, in Yunakivka rural hromada, Sumy Raion, Sumy Oblast. Until 2016, the local government body was Yunakivka Village Council.

== Geography ==
The village of Sadky is located 4 km from the village of Yunakivka and 5 km from the border with Russia. The village is surrounded by a large forest.

== History ==
On June 12, 2020, in accordance with the Resolution of the Cabinet of Ministers of Ukraine No. 723-r "On the Determination of Administrative Centers and Approval of Territories of Territorial Communities of Sumy Region", it became part of the Yunakivka settlement hromada.

On July 19, 2020, as a result of the administrative-territorial reform and liquidation of the Sumy Raion (1923—2020), the village became part of the newly formed Sumy Raion.

=== Russo-Ukrainian War ===
On February 7, 2023, the village was shelled by Russian forces.

On May 24, 2024, 5 explosions were recorded in the village from Russian forces, which is believed to be a 120 mm mortar.

On August 4, 2024, the settlement was subjected to another shelling by Russian forces. According to the information of the OK "North", 1 explosion was recorded, believed to be a 120 mm mortar.

On August 10, 2024, the village was subjected to Russian attacks. According to the Operational Command North, 2 explosions were recorded, probably KAB glide bombs.

By 30 August 2026, Russian forces claimed to have captured the village.

== Demographics ==
According to the 2001 Ukrainian census, the village's population was 7 people. The main languages of the village were:

- Ukrainian 90.23%
- Russian 14.29%
- Belarusian 14.29%
