= Khrapivshchyna =

Village in Sumy Oblast, Ukraine

Khrapivshchyna Храпівщина
- Village
- Interactive map of Khrapivshchyna
- Location of Khrapivshchyna Khrapivshchyna (Ukraine)
- Coordinates: 51°4′45″N 34°57′25″E
- Country: Ukraine
- Oblast: Sumy Oblast
- Raion: Sumy Raion
- Hromada: Yunakivka rural hromada
- Founded: 1922
- Elevation: 219 m (719 ft)

Population (2001)
  - Total: 282
- Time zone: UTC+2
  - Summer (DST): UTC+3
- Postal code: 42335
- Area code: +380 542

Khrapivshchyna (Ukrainian: Храпівщина, Russian: Храповщина) is a village in Ukraine, in Yunakivka rural hromada, Sumy Raion, Sumy Oblast. Until 2016, the local government body was Kyianytsia Village Council.

== Geography ==
The village of Khrapivshchyna is located near the sources of the Oleshnia River, downstream at a distance of 1.5 km is the village of Nova Sich. The village is adjacent to a large forest (oak). The H07 highway passes nearby.

== History ==
On June 12, 2020, in accordance with the Resolution of the Cabinet of Ministers of Ukraine No. 723-r "On the Determination of Administrative Centers and Approval of Territories of Territorial Communities of Sumy Region", it became part of the Krasnopillia settlement hromada.

On July 19, 2020, as a result of the administrative-territorial reform and liquidation of the Krasnopillia Raion, the village became part of the newly formed Sumy Raion.

On February 23, 2023, by decision No. 4 of the Yunakivka Village Council "On renaming streets and alleys in settlements of the Yunakivka Rural Territorial Community", it was decided to rename the street in Varachyne without changing the numbering of buildings from Pershotravneva Street to Sosnivka Street. By 29 August 2026, the village was claimed captured by Russia.

== Population ==
According to the 2001 Ukrainian census, the village's population was 282 people. The main languages of the village were:

- Ukrainian 92.98%
- Russian 6.67%
- Belarusian 0.35%
