= Yunakivka rural hromada =

Urban hromada of Sumy Oblast, Ukraine

Yunakivka rural hromada Юнаківська сільська громада
- Hromada
- Interactive map of Yunakivka rural hromada
- Location within Sumy Oblast Location within Ukraine
- Coordinates: 51°07′12″N 35°02′21″E
- Country: Ukraine
- Oblast (province): Sumy Oblast
- Raion (district): Sumy Raion

Area
  - Total: 343.3 km^{2} (132.5 sq mi)

Population (2018)
  - Total: 5,848

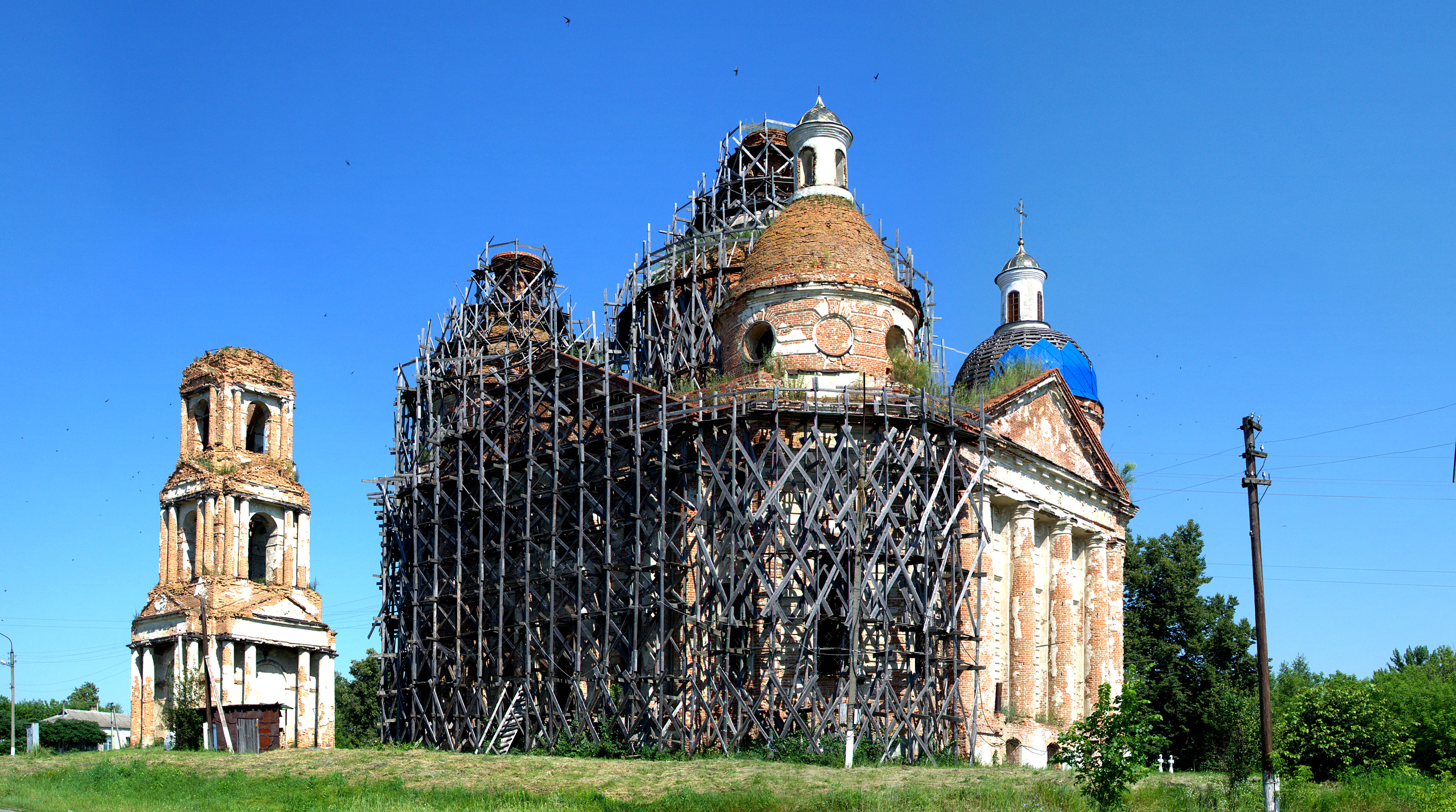
Nicholas Church (walled), Yunakivka village, Pershotravneva St., b/n

Yunakivka rural territorial hromada is a territorial community in Ukraine, in Sumy Raion, Sumy Oblast. Its administrative centre is the village of Yunakivka.

The area of the community is 343.3 km², and the population is 5,848 (2018). However, due to the Russo-Ukrainian War, the rural territory hromada were mostly evacuated, including all of the children in 2023, leaving only 127 people that do not live in the border area anymore.

On July 19, 2020, as a result of the administrative-territorial reform and liquidation of the Sumy Raion (1923—2020), the community joined the newly formed Sumy Raion.

== Demographics ==
In 2025, Ukrinform reported that the Hromada has a population of 30, compared to the pre-war population of 5,000.

== Composition ==
In addition to five rural settlements (Ivolzhanske, Kyianytsia, Mala Korchakivka, Maryino and Varachyne), the hromada includes 10 villages:

- Basivka
- Khrapivshchyna
- Korchakivka
- Loknya
- Mohrytsya
- Nova Sich
- Novenke
- Sadky
- Yablunivka
- Yunakivka
