= Izmail Border Detachment =

17th Izmail Border Detachment
- 17 прикордонний загін імені полковника Олександра Жуковського (Ukrainian)
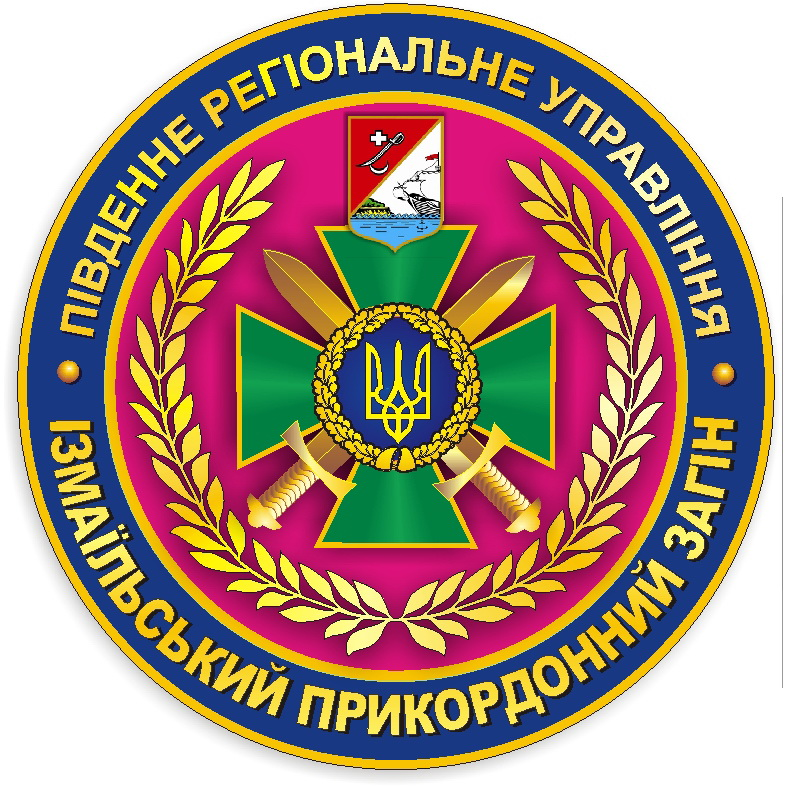
- Detachment Insignia
- Founded: 1992
- Country: Ukraine
- Allegiance: Ministry of Internal Affairs
- Branch: State Border Guard Service of Ukraine
- Type: Brigade
- Role: Border Guard
- Part of: State Border Guard Service of Ukraine
- Garrison/HQ: Izmail
- Motto: Russian warship, go fuck yourself (Note: Russian: Русский военный корабль, иди на хуй, romanized: Russky voyenny korabl, idi nakhuy, pronounced [ˈrusːkʲɪj vɐˈjenːɨj kɐˈrablʲ ɪˈdʲi ˈnaxʊj])
- Engagements: Russo-Ukrainian war: War in Donbass; Russian invasion of Ukraine; Snake Island campaign; Eastern Ukraine campaign; Southern Ukraine campaign; 2022 Kherson counteroffensive; Odesa strikes (2022-present)
- Decorations: For Courage and Bravery

Commanders
- Current commander: Colonel Pavlo Volodymyrovych Tsvelich

The Izmail Border Detachment "Colonel Oleksandr Zhukovsky" (Ukrainian: 17 прикордонний загін імені полковника Олександра Жуковського; MUN 1474) is a brigade level detachment of the Eastern Department of the State Border Service of Ukraine. The detachment guards the Moldova-Ukraine border and Romania-Ukraine border in two Raions (Bolhrad Raion and Izmail Raion) as well as three seaports and Izmail International Airport. It guards 442.4km border with Moldova including 3 km along lake and 132.8km along land and 306.6km border with Romania, 181.1km along the Danube River and 125.5 km maritime border.

== History ==
On 14 August 1940, the 79th Izmail Detachment was established by the NKVD to guard the newly acquired Bessarabia. The 79th Izmail border detachment, in cooperation with the ships of the 4th Black Sea detachment, guarded the border area on the Danube. The number of personnel of the detachment was 1569 personnel with Lieutenant Colonel Sava Hnatovych Grachov as its commander. In June-July 1941 border guards of the detachment conducted several raids (23, 24 and 25 June) on Romanian territory, capturing several settlements, including the Stara Kilia, Pardini, Rozdilny island and Satul Nou cape. On 30 June 1941, the 79th Border Detachment was transferred to the RSCHA. On 30 September 1941, the detachment arrived in Kharkiv and became the 17th Border Regiment. In March 1944, the regiment took part in the capture of Mykolaiv and the capture of Odesa in April 1944. On 25 August 1944, at 8:00 a.m., the regiment reached the northern outskirts of Izmail and was awarded the Order of the Red Banner. On 15 October 1945, the 17th Red Banner Izmail Regiment was disbanded. On 1 July 1976, it was established as the Izmail Checkpoint by KGB.

In 1994, the 17th border control detachment was formed on the basis of the Izmail checkpoint and started operations on 20 August 1994. In 1998, the 1st border commandant's office became part of the Detachment. In September 2000, the school of maritime specialists became part of the Izmail detachment and separated in 2002. In March 2002 the 2nd border command post of the detachment was created. In August 2002, the Zmiiny border outpost became part of the detachment.

On 13 February 2015, 140 servicemen of the detachment returned to Izmail following six months of deployment in Kramatorsk and combat operations in Lysychansk to Kostiantynivka.

Fortunately, the soldiers not only honorably fulfilled the tasks assigned to them, but also did not suffer any losses - all are alive and well.

The personnel of the detachment underwent a 10-day training by the Northern Regional Administration. In June 2015, the detachment received 54 new trucks and pickups of various models to replace the old Soviet era vehicles. On 6 June 2016, 80 conscript guardsmen of the detachment took the oath of loyalty to Ukraine, for the first time in eight years. In February 2017, the detachment received three KRAZ Cougar Armoured Vehicles.

On 24 February 2022, at the start of the Russian invasion of Ukraine, the Russian flagship cruiser Moskva, and patrol ship Vasily Bykov, began an assault on Snake Island, a Ukrainian island with a small island with a single village populated by fewer than 30 people, that had a contingent of 13 guardsmen stationed on the island at the time of the attack, all of them belonging to the Izmail Detachment. Moskva called on the soldiers to surrender in return for their safety, which was firmly declined by the defenders. Subsequently, Snake Island was captured by the Russian naval forces, and Ukraine had initially thought and reported that the thirteen soldiers defending it were all killed in the Russian assault. Ukrainian president Volodymyr Zelenskyy announced he would "posthumously" award the soldiers on Snake Island with the highest Ukrainian honour, the Hero of Ukraine. Russia however denied those accounts and stated that all the soldiers were not dead, but had surrendered and been taken as prisoners. On 28 February 2022, the Ukrainian Navy announced that all of the border guards were alive and detained by the Russian Navy. On 24 March 2022, some of the Snake Island border guards, including Roman Hrybov, were returned to Ukraine in a prisoner exchange. On 15 June 2023, the Izmail detachment rescued a crewman of a German-flagged vessel on the Danube. On 12 August 2023, the detachment return to Snake Island. On 3 September 2023, the Izmail Detachment shot down two Shahed-136 UAVs and four more on 6 September. In December 2023, the detachment neutralized an illegal border crossing scheme. On 13 October 2023, a guardsman of the detachment (Artem Mykolayovych Sklyarov) was killed during a combat mission in Makiivka, Luhansk Oblast.

== Structure ==
The structure of the detachment is as follows:

- Management and Headquarters
- Border Service Department "Novi Troyany"
- Border Service Department "Bolhrad"
- Border Service Department "Nahirne"
- Border Service Department "Reni"
- Border Service Department "Izmail"
- Border Service Department "Vylkove"
- Border Outpost "Snake Island"
- Mobile Border Post "Izmail"
- Rapid Response Mobile Checkpoint
- Guardian units

There are 17 checkpoints operated by the detachment:

- Moldova-Ukraine border
  - "Novi Troyani"
  - "Tabaky"
  - "Vynogradivka"
  - "Reni"
- Ukraine-Romania border
  - "Reni"
  - "Izmail"
  - "Vylkove"
  - "Kilia"
- Internal Automobile Checkpoints
  - "Zaliznychne"
  - "Dolynske"
- International Railway Checkpoints
  - "Frikatsei"
  - "Bolhrad"
  - "Reni"
- Seaport Checkpoints
  - "Reni seaport"
  - "Izmail Sea Trade Port"
  - "Ust-Danube Sea Trade Port"
- Airport Checkpoint
  - "Izmail International Airport"

== Commanders ==
- Colonel Leonid Ivanovych Yuzhbabenko (1982-1994)
- Colonel Volodymyr Ivanovych Lysov (1994-2000)
- Lieutenant Colonel Vadim Stepanovych Shelest (2000)
- Colonel Valery Oleksandrovich Subotin (2000-2001)
- Colonel Korobka Anatoly Mykolayovych (2001-2003)
- Colonel Ihor Fedorovych Momot (2003-2006)
- Colonel Volodymyr Valentinovych Kuzmenko (2006-2008)
- Lieutenant Colonel Avetiuk Valery Stanislavovych (2008-2010)
- Colonel Vasylkivskyi Vladyslav Stanislavovych (2010-2012)
- Colonel Oleksandr Mykolayovych Zadorozhny (2012-2014)
- Colonel Andriy Vasyliovych Panchenko (2014)
- Colonel Volodymyr Petrovych Zub (2014-2021)
- Colonel Lutskov Viktor Mykolayovych (2021-2022)
- Colonel Pavlo Volodymyrovych Tsvelich (2022-)

== Sources ==
- Історія 79 прикордонного загону
- Ізмаїльський прикордонний загін
- Всеукраїнський портал прикордонників
- В Ізмаїлі зустріли прикордонників, які повернулися із зони АТО
