= Bilovody =

Village in Sumy Oblast, Ukraine

Bilovody Біловоди
- Village
- Interactive map of Bilovody
- Location of Bilovody Bilovody (Ukraine)
- Coordinates: 51°10′35″N 34°58′30″E
- Country: Ukraine
- Oblast: Sumy Oblast
- Raion: Sumy Raion
- Hromada: Khotin settlement hromada
- Founded: 1680
- Elevation: 174 m (571 ft)

Population (2001)
  - Total: 487
- Time zone: UTC+2
  - Summer (DST): UTC+3
- Postal code: 42310
- Area code: +380 542

Bilovody is a village in Ukraine, in Khotin settlement hromada, Sumy Raion, Sumy Oblast. The population of the village was evacuated due to the Russo-Ukrainian War. Until 2020, the local government body was the Bilovody Village Council.

== Geography ==
The village is located on the banks of the Bilovod river, not far from its sources. Downstream, 2.5 km away, is the village of Zhuravka. There is a large dam on the river and the border with Russia is 3 km away.

== History ==
Founded around 1680 by Cossack settlers from Right-Bank Ukraine.

The village suffered as a result of the Holodomor of Ukrainians carried out by the USSR government in 1932–1933 and the famine of 1946–47. At the initiative of the Soviet authorities, the Orthodox church was destroyed.

On June 12, 2020, in accordance with the Resolution of the Cabinet of Ministers of Ukraine No. 723-r "On the Determination of Administrative Centers and Approval of Territories of Territorial Communities of Sumy Region", it became part of the Khotin settlement hromada.

On July 19, 2020, as a result of the administrative-territorial reform and liquidation of the Sumy Raion (1923—2020), the community joined the newly formed Sumy Raion.

=== Russo-Ukrainian War ===
On August 13, 2022, at around 2 pm, a mortar shelling of the village was carried out from the territory of the Russian Federation, which had 17 recorded hits. On August 15, 2022, Russian forces launched artillery shelling on the village.

On July 22, 2023, the village was damaged by shelling. On July 27, 2023, rockets and mortar attacks were launched on the village.

On November 21, 2023, Russian forces again shelled the village with artillery and mortars.

On May 1, 2024, residents of the village were evacuated to safe places due to constant Russian shelling. On June 24, 2024, according to the North Command, the settlement was shelled by the Russian aggressor. Two explosions were recorded, presumably a tank.

On August 7, 2024, the village was subjected to air, missile, and artillery strikes by the Russian aggressor. On August 10, 2024, Russian troops destroyed an educational institution in the village. Russian forces struck with a guided aerial bomb, as reported by the Operational Command North. A total of 2 explosions were recorded, probably KAB. On August 17, 2024, the Operational Command North reported shelling of the Sumy region. Among the affected settlements was the village of Bilovody: 1 explosion, presumably a KAB.

Russian forces first entered the village on 25 April 2025 during the 2025 Sumy Oblast incursion. Russian forces captured the village by 25 May 2025.

== Population ==
In 2025, due to Russian shelling, the village population was evacuated.

According to data for 1864 , the village of Vlasnitsa in the Sumsky Uyezd of the Kharkov Governorate had a population of 2,030 people (1,014 males and 1,016 females), 183 households, an Orthodox church, and a distillery.

By 1914, the number of residents of the village, the centre of the Bilovodsk volost, had increased to 2,298 people.

According to the 2001 Ukrainian census, the village's population was 1,076 people. The main languages of the village were:

- Ukrainian 93.44%
- Russian 5.94%
- Other/Not specific 0.62%
