= Yunakivka =

Village in Sumy Oblast, Ukraine

Yunakivka Юнаківка
- Village
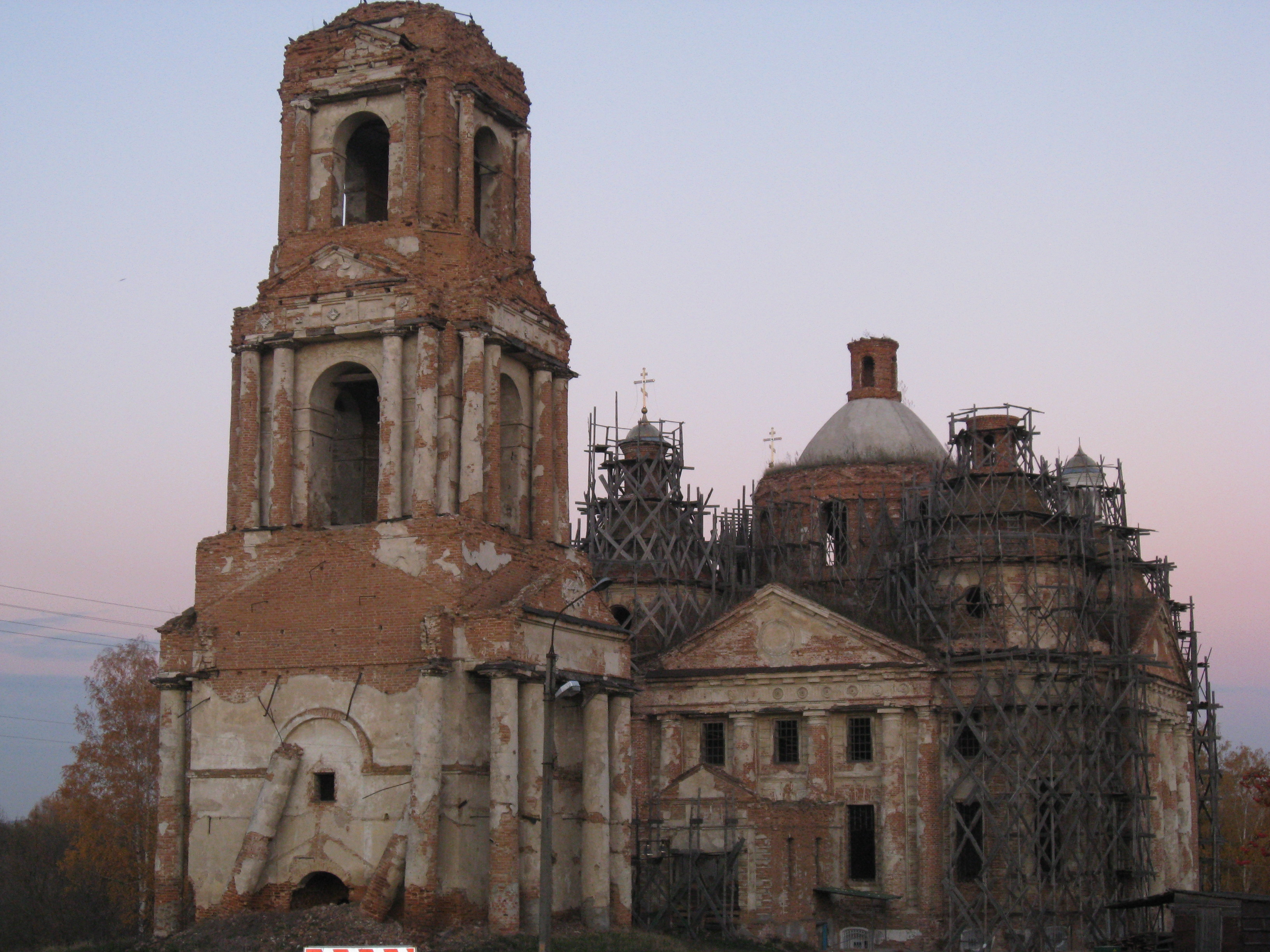
- The Church of the Nativity of the Mother of God in Yunakivka
- Interactive map of Yunakivka
- Location of Yunakivka in Sumy Oblast Location of Yunakivka in Ukraine
- Coordinates: 51°07′12″N 35°02′21″E
- Country: Ukraine
- Oblast: Sumy
- Raion: Sumy
- Hromada: Yunakivka rural hromada
- Established: 1685

Population (2020)
  - Total: 1,741
- Time zone: UTC+2
  - Summer (DST): UTC+3
- Postal code: 42313
- Area code: +380 542

Yunakivka (Ukrainian: Юнаківка) is a village in Sumy Raion, Sumy Oblast. It is the capital of Yunakivka rural hromada, one of the hromadas of Ukraine. As of September 26, 2025, it is under Russian occupation as a result of the Russo-Ukrainian War's 2025 Sumy offensive.

== Geography ==
The village of Yunakivka is located at the source of the Loknya river (a tributary of the Sudzha river), with the village of Loknya adjoining it downstream. Several main gas pipelines run around the village. The village is located 6 km from the Russian border. There is an international automobile checkpoint "Yunakivka". The importance of this settlement lies in the fact that the national highway N-07 passes through the village, connecting Kyiv—Sumy—Yunakivka—Kursk. On this section, the connection runs between Kursk and Sumy.

== History ==
=== Founding and early history ===
Yunakivka was founded in 1685 by sotnik S. Yunok, comprising lands he owned which were farmed by migrants from Volhynia. It was part of the Sumy Regiment of the Cossack Hetmanate. Prior to the emancipation reform of 1861, Yunakivka was a subject of the House of Golitsyn, which owned 7,312 serfs in the surrounding area. A fabric factory was constructed in the village in 1891, providing an economic lifeline to inhabitants. A 1893 riot over the sale of the village's sugar factory to the neighbouring village of Kyianytsia resulted in the arrests of 33 people.

=== 20th century ===
Yunakivka was occupied by the Red Army on 3 December 1918 amidst the Ukrainian–Soviet War, and was the site of a battle between the Red and White armies in August 1919. The village was occupied by Nazi Germany during World War II. During the German occupation, four people were executed and 54 tortured.

Yunakivka is known for the classical Church of the Nativity of the Mother of God. It is one of three Eastern Orthodox churches built by the House of Golitsyn, and the only one which has survived to the present day. Mostly destroyed by youths during the 1960s, it has been undergoing restorations since 2004. The church was subordinated to the Ukrainian Orthodox Church (Moscow Patriarchate) in 2018 after a period of conflict over the site between the UOC(MP) and the Ukrainian Orthodox Church – Kyiv Patriarchate.

=== Russian invasion of Ukraine ===
As a result of the Russian invasion of Ukraine, Yunakivka's location six kilometres from the Russia–Ukraine border has led to threats against the local population. The village's kindergarten was destroyed, causing some families to leave, but the majority of residents have refused to flee.

It has been reported that columns of Russian military vehicles moved through Yunakivka in the direction of Sumy in February 2022 during the Russian invasion of Ukraine. As of January 2026, Yunakivka is under full control of the Russian forces. On November 16, 2026, Ukrainian forces recaptured Yunakivka.

== Demographics ==
As of October 14, 2024 the population had reportedly dropped to only 12 people from 1,741 as of the census in 2001. The linguistic composition in 2001 was as follows:

Native languages in Yunakivka
	percent
Ukrainian	93.2%
Russian	6.7%
Belarusian	0.1%
others	0.1%

== Notable people ==
- Oleksandra Kalychenko, Soviet railroad worker.
- Leonid Matviienko, singer.
- Mykola Orkhimenko, Hero of the Soviet Union.
- Yevhen Panchenko, bandurist.
