= Varachyne =

Rural settlement in Sumy Oblast, Ukraine

Varachyne Варачине
- Rural settlement
- Interactive map of Varachyne
- Location of Varachyne Varachyne (Ukraine)
- Coordinates: 51°8′31″N 34°55′25″E
- Country: Ukraine
- Oblast: Sumy Oblast
- Raion: Sumy Raion
- Hromada: Yunakivka rural hromada
- Elevation: 199 m (653 ft)

Population (2001)
  - Total: 60
- Time zone: UTC+2
  - Summer (DST): UTC+3
- Postal code: 42316
- Area code: +380 542

Varachyne is a rural settlement in Yunakivka rural hromada, Sumy Raion, Sumy Oblast, Ukraine. Until 2020, the local government body was the Kyianytsia Village Council.

== Geography ==
The village of Varachyne is located near the sources of the Snagist River, 1.5 km from the village of Novomykolaivka. A drying stream with a dam flows through the village.

== History ==
On June 12, 2020, in accordance with the Resolution of the Cabinet of Ministers of Ukraine No. 723-r "On the Determination of Administrative Centers and Approval of Territories of Territorial Communities of Sumy Region", it became part of the Yunakivka rural hromada.

On July 19, 2020, as a result of the administrative-territorial reform and liquidation of the Sumy Raion (1923—2020), the village became part of the newly formed Sumy Raion.

On February 23, 2023, by decision No. 4 of the Yunakivka Village Council "On renaming streets and alleys in settlements of the Yunakivka Rural Territorial Community", it was decided to rename the street in Varachyne without changing the numbering of buildings from Pershotravneva Street to Travneva Street.

During the Russo-Ukrainian War, Russian forces first came into Varachyne in July 2025. On July 22, Russian forces captured the village. On August 21, Ukrainian forces both re-entered and recaptured the village. By June 2026, the village is under control of Russian forces.

== Population ==
According to the 2001 Ukrainian census, the village's population was 60 people. The main languages of the village were:

- Ukrainian 80.65%
- Russian 9.68%
- Armenian 9.68%
