= Basivka, Sumy Oblast =

Village in Sumy Oblast, Ukraine

Basivka Басівка
- Village
- Interactive map of Basivka
- Location of Basivka within Ukraine Basivka (Sumy Oblast)
- Coordinates: 51.187054°N 35.0882°E
- Country: Ukraine
- Oblast: Sumy Oblast
- Raion: Sumy Raion
- Hromada: Yunakivka rural hromada
- First mentioned: 1662
- Elevation: 159 m (522 ft)

Population (2001 census)
  - Total: 644
  - Estimate (2025): 2
- Time zone: UTC+2 (EET)
  - Summer (DST): UTC+3 (EEST)
- Postal code: 42312
- Area code: +380 542
- KATOTTH: UA59080310020044337

Basivka (Ukrainian: Басівка; Russian: Басовка) is a village in the Sumy Raion of Sumy Oblast in eastern Ukraine, at about 29.46 kilometres (18.31 mi) northeast (NE) of the centre of Sumy city. It belongs to Yunakivka rural hromada, one of the hromadas of Ukraine.

== History ==
The first written mention of the village dates back to 1662.

The village suffered as a result of the Holodomor carried out by the Soviet Union in 1923–1933 and in 1946–1947.

=== Russo-Ukrainian War ===
On 3 April 2025, Russia claimed to have captured Basivka; this has been denied by Ukraine.

On 9 April, it was confirmed that Russia had captured the village.

== Demographics ==
As of the 2001 Ukrainian census, the settlement had 644 inhabitants, whose native languages were 91.96% Ukrainian, 7.42% Russian and 0.15% Belarusian.
