= Belarusian language in Ukraine =

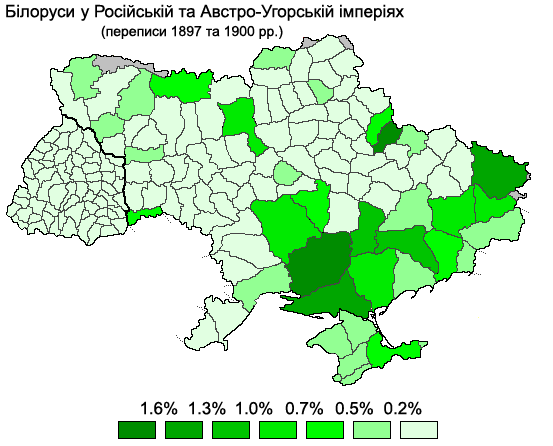
The prevalence of the Belarusian language in the late 19th century.

According to the Ukrainian census of 2001, the Belarusian language is native to 56,249 people in the country, including 19.8% of ethnic Belarusians. The largest number of Belarusian-speakers live in Dnipropetrovsk Oblast (6,239), Crimea (5,204) and Donetsk Oblast (4,842). The regions with the largest percentages of Belarusian speakers out of their total population are Crimea (0.26%), Chernihiv Oblast (0.19%) and Dnipropetrovsk Oblast (0.18%).

== Overall ==
In Ukraine overall, Belarusian speakers over time:

	1989	2001
Total number	161,404	56,249
%	0.31%	0.12%

== Among ethnic Belarusians ==
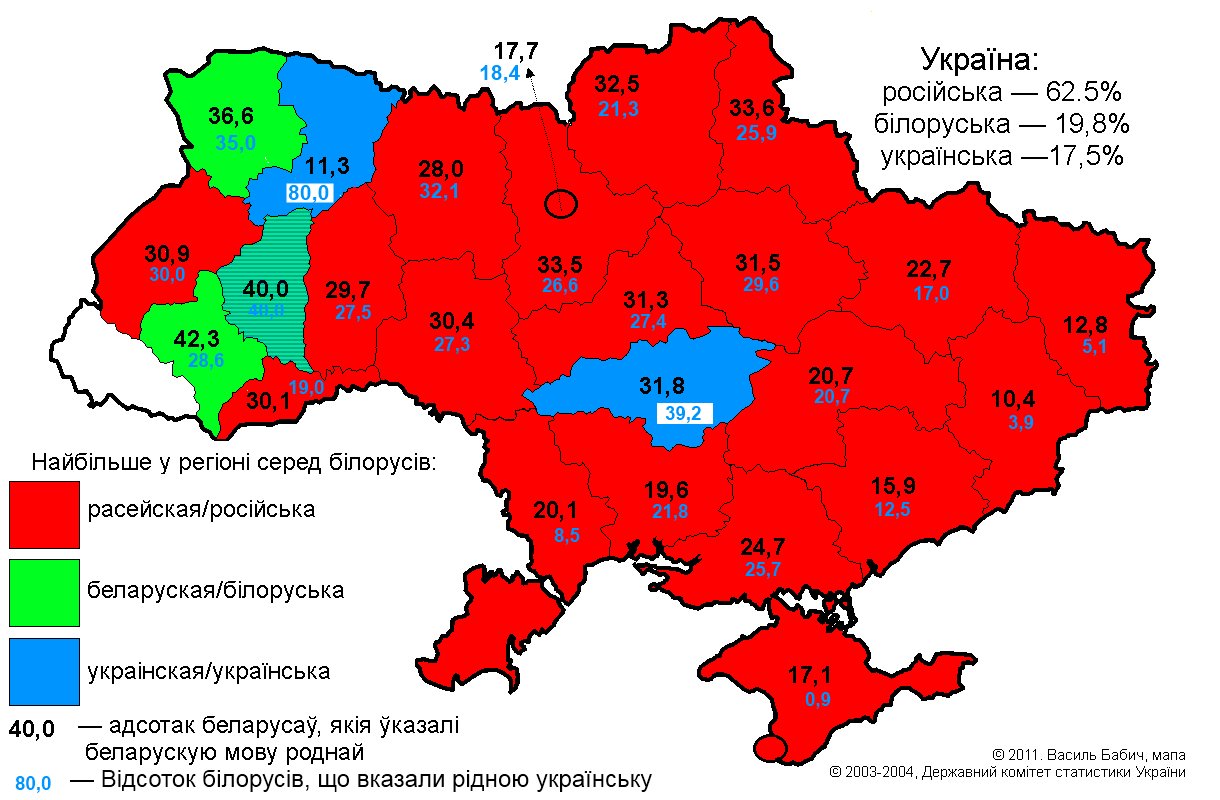
Map of the prevalence of the Belarusian language among Belarusians in Ukraine according to the 2001 census.

According to censuses, the native languages of ethnic Belarusians in Ukraine were:

Language	1979	1989	2001
Russian	56.0%	55.2%	62.5%
Belarusian	35.1%	35.5%	19.8%
Ukrainian	8.9%	9.3%	17.5%
Other	0.02%	0.1%	0.2%

Among Belarusians of Ukraine, their fluency in the Belarusian language dropped from 48.5% to 31.7% from 1989 to 2001.

== Significant Belarusian-speaking settlements ==
This chart lists settlements in which at least 10% of the population spoke Belarusian as their mother tongue during the 2001 census. Italics indicate settlements with a population of less than 25 people.

Settlement	% Belarusian speakers
Vesela Dolyna	60.0
Vyshchepanivka	40.0
Krasniy Bir	27.3
Omelusha	25.0
Hannivka	19.6
Trudove	19.1
Sosnivka	15.4
Kalashnyky	14.3
Sadky, Sumy Raion	14.3
Noviy Myr	12.6
Harkavec	12.5
Vasylivka	12.5
Olenivka	12.0
Kisivka	12.0
Soborne	11.8
Dmitrivka	11.1
Hodyn	10.0
Skelky	10.0
Konovalik	10.0
