= Hrabovske =

Village in Sumy Oblast, Ukraine

Hrabovske Грабовське
- Village
- Interactive map of Hrabovske
- Location of Hrabovske Hrabovske (Ukraine)
- Coordinates: 50°41′56″N 35°27′8″E
- Country: Ukraine
- Oblast: Sumy Oblast
- Raion: Sumy Raion
- Hromada: Krasnopillia settlement hromada
- Founded: 1682

Government
  - Village head: Larysa Kremezna
- Elevation: 196 m (643 ft)

Population (2001)
  - Total: 718
- Time zone: UTC+2
  - Summer (DST): UTC+3
- Postal code: 42450
- Area code: +380 5459

Hrabovske (formerly known as Pushkarne) is a village in Ukraine, in Krasnopillia settlement hromada, Sumy Raion, Sumy Oblast. Until 2016, the local government body was Hrabovske Village Council.

== Geography ==
The village of Hrabovske is located 21 km from Krasnopillia (passed by a local highway and P45) and the Krasnopillia railway station, on the right bank of the Sanok River, not far from its sources, downstream at a distance of 6 km is the village of Pokachevo, on the opposite bank is the village of Staroselye.

A few kilometers from the village is the Pushkarne railway station, where the Pushkarne-Ilek-Penkovka checkpoint (Krasnoyaruzhsky District, Belgorod Oblast, Russia) operates in the direction of Krasnaya Yaruga.

5 km north of the village of Hrabovske is the highest point of the Sumy Oblast - 246.2 m above sea level.

== History ==
The village was first mentioned in 1682.

On June 12, 2020, in accordance with the Resolution of the Cabinet of Ministers of Ukraine No. 723-r "On the Determination of Administrative Centers and Approval of Territories of Territorial Communities of Sumy Region", it became part of the Krasnopillia settlement hromada.

On July 19, 2020, as a result of the administrative-territorial reform and liquidation of the Krasnopillia Raion, the village became part of the newly formed Sumy Raion.

=== Russo-Ukrainian War ===
On June 24, 2024, according to information from the North Military District, the settlement was shelled by Russian forces. Seven explosions were recorded, probably from a 120 mm mortar.

On July 14, 2024, the village was shelled by Russian forces. 3 explosions were recorded, probably from 122 mm artillery.

On August 22, 2024, the settlements of Bachivsk, Rudak, Novovasilivka, Chernatske, Porozok, Slavhorod, Karpovychi, Hrabovske, and Pokrovka were hit by Russian artillery fire. This was later reported by the General Staff of the Ukrainian Armed Forces in a briefing.

On December 20, 2025, Russian troops crossed the state border of Ukraine in the Hrabovske area. As a result, more than 50 civilians, mostly elderly people, were forcibly moved into Russia. This information was confirmed by the Ukrainian military and local authorities. On December 21, 2025, the Institute for the Study of War stated that Russian forces had captured Hrabovske. As of December 24, 2025, Ukrainian media states the village has been captured by Russian forces.

== Population ==
According to data from 1864, the state settlement of Akhtyrsky Uyezd of Kharkov Governorate had a population of 1,945 people (960 men and 985 women), 90 households, an Orthodox church, and two annual fairs and bazaars.

As of 1914, the village belonged to the Riasne Volost and the number of inhabitants had increased to 7,661 people.

According to the 2001 Ukrainian census, the village's population was 829 people. The main languages of the village were:

- Ukrainian 92.68%
- Russian 6.91%
- Armenian 0.28%
- Belarusian 0.14%

== Notable people ==
The following were born in the village:

- Timofiy Kyrylovych Bogatyr (1905–1977) — Head of the Ukrainian Hydrometeorological Center of the Ukrainian SSR.
- Pavlo Hrabovsky - A Ukrainian writer. In 1964, the village was renamed in his memory. A museum was opened in the village and a monument to the outstanding countryman was erected.
- Serhiy NaumovSerhiy Oleksandrovych Naumov (1958–2025) - A Ukrainian historian.
