= Pokrovka, Sumy Oblast =

Village in Sumy Oblast, Ukraine

Pokrovka Покровка
- Village
- Interactive map of Pokrovka
- Location of Pokrovka Pokrovka (Ukraine)
- Coordinates: 50°48′10″N 35°22′42″E
- Country: Ukraine
- Oblast: Sumy Oblast
- Raion: Sumy Raion
- Hromada: Krasnopillia settlement hromada
- Founded: 1652
- Elevation: 207 m (679 ft)

Population (2001)
  - Total: 768
- Time zone: UTC+2
  - Summer (DST): UTC+3
- Postal code: 42437
- Area code: +380 5459

Pokrovka is a village in Ukraine, in Krasnopillia settlement hromada, Sumy Raion, Sumy Oblast. Until 2016, the local government body was Pokrovka Village Council.

== Geography ==
The village of Pokrovka is located near the sources of the Syrovatka River, downstream at a distance of 0.5 km is the village of Mykhailivka.

The village is located 18 km northeast of Krasnopillia (highway T 1901 ) and the Krasnopillia railway station.

Not far from the village, on the local highway in the direction of Krasnaya Yaruga, there is a checkpoint Pokrovka - "Kolotilivka", Krasnoyaruzhsky District, Belgorod Oblast, Russia.

== History ==
The village was founded 1652 by settlers from the village of Zlodiyivka, which is on the right bank of the Dnieper River near Trypillia, who gave the settlement the same name.

Soviet power in the village was established on January 18, 1917. Instead of the village government, the revolutionary committee became the body of power, headed by a resident of the village, Matviets Feoktist Grigorovich. Then came the period of foreign intervention. German troops seized power in the village. The villagers joined the partisans and showed resistance. The commander of the partisan detachment was P. S. Bagatsky. The detachment included villagers from Novodmitrivka, Vidnivka, Vesely, Mezenivka, and Slavhorod. In December 1918, Soviet power was restored in Pokrovka. In July 1919, Denikin's troops invaded the village, who were expelled in December 1919. Deserters who hid in the forests and organized themselves into gangs and robbed ordinary people caused great harm to the population of Pokrovka in 1919-1920.

The peasants welcomed the New Economic Policy, because agriculture in Pokrovka began to grow. People were satisfied with the new government. But later collective farms began to form. In 1931, most of the peasants in Pokrovka joined the collective farm, the head of which was elected a local resident, Andriy Timofeevich Lampak. The collective farm mainly grew grain and sugar beets, as well as flax and hemp. During the collectivization process, the kulak and middle-class farms were liquidated. The collective farm was poor, there was a lack of equipment, machines, and horses. In this regard, the land was cultivated poorly, and productivity decreased. Living conditions were very difficult. People received almost nothing for work on the collective farm fields, they did "just for the heck of it." People did not starve, but many residents of Pokrovka still fled to the cities, to new buildings. And after the Law on the Protection of Socialist Property (August 7, 1932), which introduced the highest penalty for stealing grain, the so-called "Law of Spikelets", aggressive grain procurement actions began. All household goods and livestock were taken from the owners.

The village suffered as a result of the Holodomor carried out by the Soviet Union in 1923–1933 and in 1946–1947. There is a memorial for the Holodomor in the village.

In the first days of World War II, 40 people were mobilized from Pokrovka, including the head of the collective farm, Korkh Semen, and the head of the village council, Sheichenko. On October 18, 1941, the Nazi army entered Pokrovka. 59 young men and women were sent to Germany for hard labor. Patriotically minded peasants provided active assistance to the partisan unit of Naumov Mikhail Ivanovich . The occupation lasted until February 23, 1943. After the war, the village was difficult to rebuild. The main workforce was women - more than 80 percent. The beginning of post-war reconstruction coincided with the famine of 1946-1947. According to recollections, no one died of hunger in the village during these years, but there were cases when people became obese. Both old and young went to work, because the collective farm cooked mortar and fed the workers. Many peasants went to the western regions of Ukraine, hired themselves out to work as shepherds for a piece of bread, or beg. In 1964, the collective farm was named after P. S. Bagatsky, who during the Ukrainian Revolution of 1917-1921 was the commander of a partisan detachment. Of course, there were some successes in farming, but young people fled to the cities, leaving their native village forever, because the advantages of urban life were obvious. The population in Pokrovka is decreasing catastrophically, mortality is higher than birth rate.

On June 12, 2020, in accordance with the Resolution of the Cabinet of Ministers of Ukraine No. 723-r "On the Determination of Administrative Centers and Approval of Territories of Territorial Communities of Sumy Region", it became part of the Krasnopillia settlement hromada.

On July 19, 2020, as a result of the administrative-territorial reform and liquidation of the Krasnopillia Raion, the village became part of the newly formed Sumy Raion.

=== Russo-Ukrainian War ===
On March 19, 2024, the village was twice shelled by Russian forces. The shelling was carried out by artillery, 120 and 82 mm mortars, and tanks.

On July 16, 2024, Russian troops shelled the village. Six explosions were recorded, likely from 122 mm artillery.

On August 1, 2024, the village was again shelled by Russian forces. Two explosions were recorded, probably from an FPV drone.

On August 10, 2024, the village was again subjected to hostile Russian attacks. According to the operational command "North", 3 attacks were recorded: 4 explosions, probably an FPV drone.

On August 11, 2024, the village was once again shelled by Russian forces. According to the Operational Command North, 2 shellings were recorded: 3 explosions, probably KAB.

On August 14, 2024, the Operational Command North reported that Russian forces shelled the Sumy Oblast. 1 explosion was recorded in the village, probably a KAB; 10 explosions, probably MLRS; 5 explosions, probably 152 mm artillery.

On August 17, 2024, the Operational Command North reported shelling of the Sumy Oblast. Among the affected settlements, the village of Pokrovka - 2 explosions, probably 122 mm artillery; 8 explosions, probably 120 mm mortar; 6 shelling: 17 explosions, probably FPV drone; 1 explosion, probably VOG dropping from a UAV.

On August 22, 2024, the settlements of Bachivsk, Rudak, Novovasilivka, Chernatske, Porozok, Slavhorod, Karpovychi, Hrabovske and Pokrovka were hit by Russian artillery fire. This was later reported by the General Staff of the Ukrainian Armed Forces in a briefing.

On August 27, 2024, the Operational Command North reported shelling of the village. 4 shells were recorded: 29 explosions, probably 122 mm artillery; 9 explosions, probably 120 mm mortar. As a result of the shelling, a preschool educational institution was destroyed.

Russian forces first entered the village on 8 February 2026. Russia captured it by the end od February 2026.

== Population ==
According to data from 1864, the state settlement of Pokrovka (Zlodiyivka) of the Akhtyrsky Uyezd of the Kharkov Governorate, had a population of 2,007 people (976 males and 1,031 females), 322 households, an Orthodox church, and 4 annual fairs.

By 1914, the village was the center of a separate Pokrovskaya Volost, and the number of residents had increased to 4,139 people.

According to the 2001 Ukrainian census, the village's population was 768 people. The main languages of the village were:

- Ukrainian 95.72%
- Russian 4.02%
- Moldovan (Romanian) 0.26%.

In June 2023, 360 residents lived in the village.

== Churches ==
According to folk legends, there were two churches in Pokrovka, but no one knows for sure where they are now. Closer to our time, in 1801, a new wooden church of the Protection of the Blessed Virgin Mary was built. The stone church was founded in 1878 and completed in 1887 according to the design of the Kharkiv architect Fyodor Ivanovich Danilov. It was built on a prominent place where now, after the destruction of the church, the house of culture is located. The church parish and zemstvo folk elementary schools operated at the church. The premises of these educational institutions are still in use today.

== Notable people ==
The following were born in the village:

- Yegor Bogatsky (1917-1996) - A Soviet tanker, participant in World War II, Hero of the Soviet Union (1945), Guards unit.
- Yevhen Boguslavsky (1883–1950) - A Ukrainian statesman, public figure, educational figure, and cultural figure.
