= Riasne, Sumy Oblast =

Village in Sumy Oblast, Ukraine

Riasne Рясне
- Village
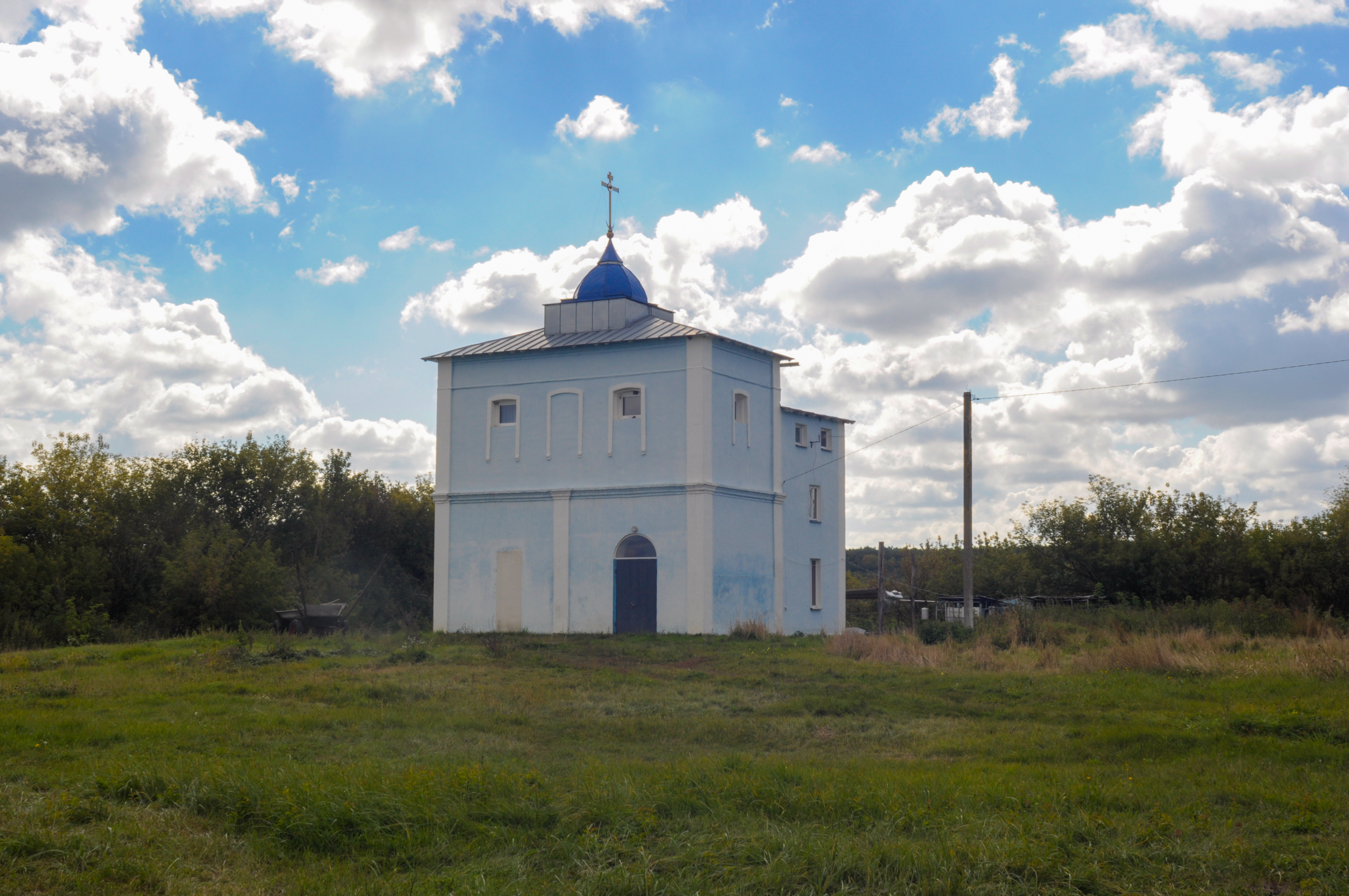
- Interactive map of Riasne
- Location of Riasne Riasne (Ukraine)
- Coordinates: 50°41′22″N 35°23′29″E
- Country: Ukraine
- Oblast: Sumy Oblast
- Raion: Sumy Raion
- Hromada: Krasnopillia settlement hromada
- Founded: 1670
- Elevation: 183 m (600 ft)

Population (2001)
  - Total: 814
- Time zone: UTC+2
  - Summer (DST): UTC+3
- Postal code: 42452
- Area code: +380 5459

Riasne is a village in Ukraine, in Krasnopillia settlement hromada, Sumy Raion, Sumy Oblast. Until 2016, the local government body was Riasne Village Council.

== Geography ==
The village of Riasne is located 57 km from Sumy and 18 km southeast of Krasnopillia, near the sources of the Korova River, at the confluence of an unnamed stream with it, downstream at a distance of 10 km is the village of Slavhorod. There are many small ravines on the river and its tributaries. There is a railway nearby, a passenger stop in Pyatipillya that is 2.5 km away. The nearest railway station is the Krasnopillia railway station (18 km away).

== History ==
The village was founded by Sumy colonel Gerasim Kondratiev in 1670 and was populated by his Cherkasy subjects.

The village has a St. Dmitriy Church.

The village suffered as a result of the Holodomor carried out by the Soviet Union in 1923–1933 and in 1946–1947.

On June 12, 2020, in accordance with the Resolution of the Cabinet of Ministers of Ukraine No. 723-r "On the Determination of Administrative Centers and Approval of Territories of Territorial Communities of Sumy Region", it became part of the Krasnopillia settlement hromada.

On July 19, 2020, as a result of the administrative-territorial reform and liquidation of the Krasnopillia Raion, the village became part of the newly formed Sumy Raion.

=== Russo-Ukrainian War ===
On May 24, 2024, 3 shelling attacks by the Russian aggressor were recorded on the village: 19 explosions, probably from a 120 mm mortar; 1 explosion, probably from a Lancet UAV. As a result of the shelling, 1 resident was injured and power lines were damaged.

On June 30, 2024, the village was attacked by a FPV drone (2 explosions) and also shelled by 122 mm artillery (14 explosions). Critical infrastructure damaged.

Russian forces first entered the village on 3 May 2026. Ukrainian forces recaptured the village on 23 May 2026. On 26 May 2026, Russian sources claimed the capture of the village. According to ISW, Russian forces re-entered the village on 28 May 2026. Russian forces captured the village on 13 July 2026.

== Population ==
According to data from 1864, the state settlement, the center of the Akhtyrsky Uyezd of the Kharkov Governorate, had a population of 824 people (412 men and 412 women), 90 households, an Orthodox church, a distillery and saltpeter factories, and markets.

By 1914, the village was the center of a separate Ryasne Volost, and the number of residents had increased to 2,014 people.

According to the 2001 Ukrainian census, the village's population was 814 people. The main languages of the village were:

- Ukrainian 93.70%
- Russian 6.06%
- Belarusian 0.12%
- Other/not specified 0.12%

== Notable people ==
The following were born in the village:

- Bohdan Romanovych Hrytsenko - A Ukrainian soldier who participated in the Russo-Ukrainian War.
- Anatoly Deineka - A Ukrainian Soviet architect, former chief architect of the Sumy region, laureate of the USSR Council of Ministers Prize, Honored Architect of Ukraine, author of the famous guide to the Sumy region "Architectural Monuments of the Sumy Region".
- Ivan Oliynyk (1909–1993) - A Soviet military man. Full holder of the Order of Glory. Participant in the Winter War and World War II.
