= Popivka, Sumy Raion =

Village in Sumy Oblast, Ukraine

Popivka Попівка
- Village
- Interactive map of Popivka
- Location of Popivka Popivka (Ukraine)
- Coordinates: 50°46′16″N 35°28′7″E
- Country: Ukraine
- Oblast: Sumy Oblast
- Raion: Sumy Raion
- Hromada: Krasnopillia settlement hromada
- Elevation: 217 m (712 ft)

Population (2001)
  - Total: 6
- Time zone: UTC+2
  - Summer (DST): UTC+3
- Postal code: 42437
- Area code: +380 5459

Popivka is a village in Ukraine, in Krasnopillia settlement hromada, Sumy Raion, Sumy Oblast. Until 2016, the local government body was Pokrovka Village Council.

== Geography ==
The village of Popivka is located at one of the sources of the Ilek River. At a distance of 1 km was the former village of Moskalivka (the village was liquidated in 1991) and at a distance of 1.5 km was the village of Vysoke.

The village is located on the border with Russia.

== History ==
In 1767, the educationalist Oleksandr Palytsyn founded the Popiv Academy.

The village suffered as a result of the Holodomor carried out by the Soviet Union in 1923–1933 and in 1946–1947.

On June 12, 2020, in accordance with the Resolution of the Cabinet of Ministers of Ukraine No. 723-r "On the Determination of Administrative Centers and Approval of Territories of Territorial Communities of Sumy Region", it became part of the Krasnopillia settlement hromada.

On July 19, 2020, as a result of the administrative-territorial reform and liquidation of the Krasnopillia Raion, the village became part of the newly formed Sumy Raion.

=== Russo-Ukrainian War ===
On 7 March 2026, DeepStateMap.Live stated that Popivka was captured by Russian forces.

According to ISW, Russian forces first entered the village before 28 May 2026. The village was captured by Russian forces on 28 May 2026.

== Population ==
According to data from 1864, the village of Vlasnitsa in the Akhtyrsky Uyezd of the Kharkov Governorate, had a population of 247 people (118 men and 129 women), with 22 households in the settlement.

According to the 2001 Ukrainian census, the village's population was 6 people. The main languages of the village were:

- Ukrainian 77.78%
- Russian 22.22%

== Notable people ==
The following was born in the village:

- Viktor Volodymyrovych Zhuravlev ("Kozubchik") – A Ukrainian soldier who participated in the Russo-Ukrainian War.
