= Prokhody, Sumy Oblast =

Village in Sumy Oblast, Ukraine

Prokhody Проходи
- Village
- Interactive map of Prokhody
- Location of Prokhody Prokhody (Ukraine)
- Coordinates: 50°55′21″N 35°21′3″E
- Country: Ukraine
- Oblast: Sumy Oblast
- Raion: Sumy Raion
- Hromada: Krasnopillia settlement hromada
- Elevation: 197 m (646 ft)

Population (2001)
  - Total: 60
- Time zone: UTC+2
  - Summer (DST): UTC+3
- Postal code: 42431
- Area code: +380 5459

Prokhody is a rural settlement in Krasnopillia settlement hromada, Sumy Raion, Sumy Oblast, Ukraine. Until 2020, the local government body was the Turia Village Council.

== Geography ==
The village of Prokhody is located in the place where the Prykil, Gryazny, Sukhy and Udava rivers originate from. At a distance of 1.5 km is the village of Marine, 2.5 km - the village of Myropilske and the village of Turia.

The border with Russia runs near the village.

== History ==
The village suffered as a result of the Holodomor carried out by the Soviet Union in 1923–1933 and in 1946–1947.

On June 12, 2020, in accordance with the Resolution of the Cabinet of Ministers of Ukraine No. 723-r "On the Determination of Administrative Centers and Approval of Territories of Territorial Communities of Sumy Region", it became part of the Krasnopillia settlement hromada.

On July 19, 2020, as a result of the administrative-territorial reform and liquidation of the Krasnopillia Raion, the village became part of the newly formed Sumy Raion.

Russian forces first entered the village on 18 April 2026.

== Population ==
According to the 2001 Ukrainian census, the village's population was 60 people. The main languages of the village were:

- Ukrainian 98.39%
- Russian 1.61%
