= Uhroidy =

Rural locality in Sumy Oblast, Ukraine

Uhroidy Угроїди
- Rural settlement
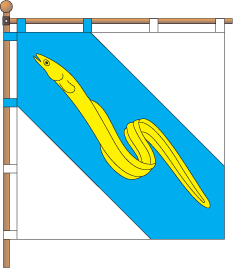
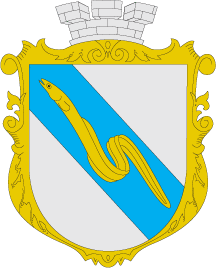
- Flag Coat of arms

- Location in Sumy Oblast Location in Ukraine
- Country: Ukraine
- Oblast: Sumy Oblast
- Raion: Sumy Raion
- Hromada: Krasnopillia settlement hromada

Population (2022)
  - Total: 1,837
- Time zone: UTC+2 (EET)
  - Summer (DST): UTC+3 (EEST)

Uhroidy (Ukrainian: Угроїди; Russian: Угроеды) is a rural settlement in Sumy Raion, Sumy Oblast, Ukraine. It is located on the banks of the Rybytsia, a tributary of the Psel in the drainage basin of the Dnieper. Uhroidy belongs to Krasnopillia settlement hromada, one of the hromadas of Ukraine. Population: 1,837 (2022 estimate).

== History ==
Until 18 July 2020, Uhroidy belonged to Krasnopillia Raion. The raion was abolished in July 2020 as part of the administrative reform of Ukraine, which reduced the number of raions of Sumy Oblast to five. The area of Krasnopillia Raion was merged into Sumy Raion.

Until 26 January 2024, Uhroidy was designated urban-type settlement. On this day, a new law entered into force which abolished this status, and Uhroidy became a rural settlement.

== Geographical location ==
The urban-type settlement of Ugroid is located near the sources of the Rybytsia River, on the slopes of the Central Russian Upland.

The climate is moderately continental. Winter is cool, summer is not hot. The average temperature in July is +19 °C, in January -7.5 °C. The maximum precipitation falls in the summer in the form of rain. The average annual amount is from 650 to 700 mm, changing from west to east.

There are several estuaries and old lakes on the river. The village is adjacent to a forest massif. Among the trees in the forests, oaks, lindens, and maples dominate. Typical large mammals are elk, roe deer, wild boar, squirrels, beavers, hares and wolves. The most common soils in the area are typical chernozem and gray soils.

== Economy ==
=== Transportation ===
The settlement has road access to Krasnopillia which is further connected with Sumy and with Kharkiv via Bohodukhiv.

The closest railway station, approximately 10 kilometres (6.2 mi) south, is in Krasnopillia. It is located on the railway which used to connect Sumy and Belgorod in Russia crossing the Russian border in Pushkarne. There is infrequent local traffic between Sumy and Pushkarne.
