= Brantsivka =

Village in Sumy Oblast, Ukraine

Brantsivka Бранцівка
- Village
- Interactive map of Brantsivka
- Location of Brantsivka Brantsivka (Ukraine)
- Coordinates: 50°36′12″N 35°12′9″E
- Country: Ukraine
- Oblast: Sumy Oblast
- Raion: Sumy Raion
- Hromada: Krasnopillia settlement hromada
- Elevation: 196 m (643 ft)

Population (2001)
  - Total: 688
- Time zone: UTC+2
  - Summer (DST): UTC+3
- Postal code: 42455
- Area code: +380 5459

Brantsivka is a village in Ukraine, in Krasnopillia settlement hromada, Sumy Raion, Sumy Oblast. Until 2016, the local government body was Brantsivka Village Council.

== Geography ==
The village is located 25 km south of the administrative center of the community and the railway station Krasnopillia. It is located on the banks of the Dernova River, which is a tributary of the Vorsklytsia River. It is upstream at a distance of 2.5 km is the village of Lozove and downstream at a distance of 2.5 km is the village of Poliane.

The village stretches along the river for 6 km. Streams flow through the village, which dry up with rapids.

== History ==
Brantsivka was founded in the middle of the 17th century.

The village suffered as a result of the Holodomor carried out by the Soviet Union in 1923–1933 and in 1946–1947, which resulted in the deaths of at least 243 villagers.

On June 12, 2020, in accordance with the Resolution of the Cabinet of Ministers of Ukraine No. 723-r "On the Determination of Administrative Centers and Approval of Territories of Territorial Communities of Sumy Region", it became part of the Krasnopillia settlement hromada.

On July 19, 2020, as a result of the administrative-territorial reform and liquidation of the Krasnopillia Raion, the village became part of the newly formed Sumy Raion.

== Population ==
According to data from 1864, the state settlement, the center of the Zhigailivka Volost of the Kharkov Governorate, had a population of 860 people (406 men and 454 women), 161 households, and an Orthodox church.

By 1914, the number of inhabitants of the village had increased to 2,468 people.

According to the 1989 census of the Ukrainian SSR, the village's population was 863 people, of whom 386 were men and 477 were women.

According to the 2001 Ukrainian census, the village's population was 688 people. The main languages of the village were:

- Ukrainian 97.99%
- Russian 1.72%
- Belarusian 0.14%
- Other/not specified 0.15%
