= Slavhorod, Sumy Oblast =

Village in Sumy Oblast, Ukraine

Slavhorod Славгород
- Village
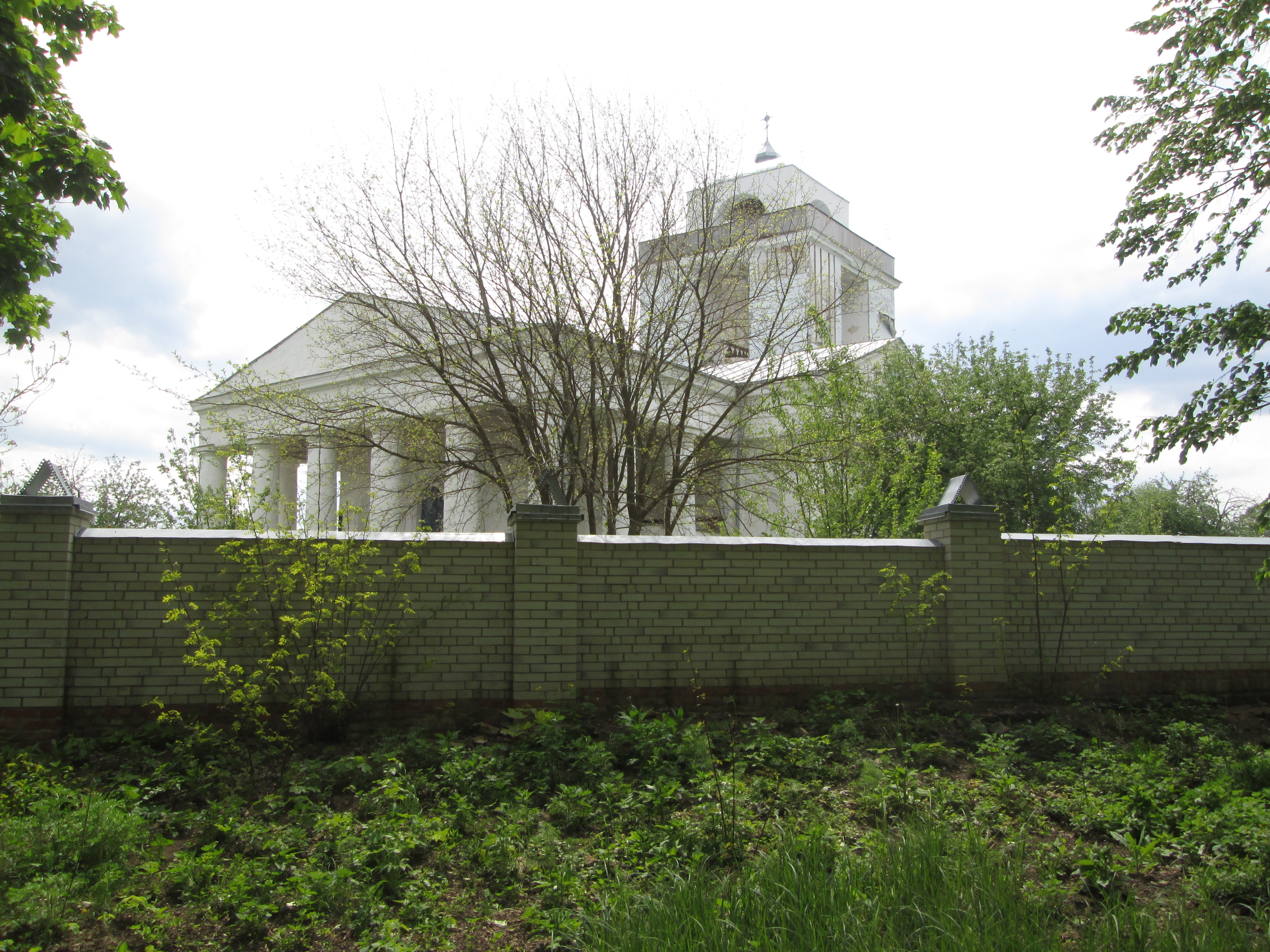
- Trinity Church
- Interactive map of Slavhorod
- Location of Slavhorod Slavhorod (Ukraine)
- Coordinates: 50°35′29″N 35°21′1″E
- Country: Ukraine
- Oblast: Sumy Oblast
- Raion: Sumy Raion
- Hromada: Krasnopillia settlement hromada
- Elevation: 129 m (423 ft)

Population (2001)
  - Total: 909
- Time zone: UTC+2
  - Summer (DST): UTC+3
- Postal code: 42456
- Area code: +380 5459

Slavhorod (Ukrainian: Славгород) is a village in Ukraine, in Krasnopillia settlement hromada, Sumy Raion, Sumy Oblast. Until 2016, the local government body was Slavhorod Village Council.

== Geography ==
The village is located on the left bank of the Pozhnia River, where the Korova River flows into it. 3.5 km away was the village of Cheremushky, which was removed from the register in 2007, 2.5 km upstream of the Pozhnia is the village of Mezenivka, downstream (1 km) is the village of Porozok, on the opposite side of which is the village of Verkhnia Pozhnia

== History ==
The village suffered as a result of the Holodomor carried out by the Soviet Union in 1923–1933 and in 1946–1947.

On June 12, 2020, in accordance with the Resolution of the Cabinet of Ministers of Ukraine No. 723-r "On the Determination of Administrative Centers and Approval of Territories of Territorial Communities of Sumy Region", it became part of the Krasnopillia settlement hromada.

On July 19, 2020, as a result of the administrative-territorial reform and liquidation of the Krasnopillia Raion, the village became part of the newly formed Sumy Raion.

On October 18, 2023, the Trinity Church, which was constructed in 1807, was inscribed on the State Register of Immovable Monuments as a monument of national significance with the protection number 180058.

=== Russo-Ukrainian War ===
On October 7, 2022, a senior soldier of the State Border Guard Service of Ukraine, Valeriy Petrovych Bedelev, died in the village.

On May 12, 2024, at about 9 a.m., a village resident born in 1954 died as a result of enemy strikes. Two more were wounded, men born in 1983 and 2005. The deceased and the wounded were from the same family and were in their yard at the time of the shelling.

On June 30, 2024, the Operational Command North reported another shelling of the village. 3 explosions were recorded, probably from 122 mm artillery.

On August 10, 2024, Operational Command North reported another shelling of the village. 1 explosion was recorded, probably an FPV drone; 7 explosions, probably a 120 mm mortar.

On August 17, 2024, Operational Command North reported shelling of Sumy Oblast. Among the affected settlements, the village of Slavhorod - 2 shelling: 26 explosions, probably an air strike; 10 explosions, probably 152 mm artillery; 3 shelling: 15 explosions, probably a 120 mm mortar. As a result of the shelling, a farm building was damaged.

On August 21, 2024, Russian forces fired mortars at the village. The local fire department was damaged. A fire department employee, a shop assistant, and a local resident received shrapnel wounds. They were provided with medical assistance.

On August 22, 2024, the settlements of Bachivsk, Rudak, Novovasilivka, Chernatske, Porozok, Slavhorod, Karpovychi, Hrabovske, and Pokrovka were hit by Russian artillery fire. This was later reported by the General Staff of the Ukrainian Armed Forces in a briefing.

On August 26, 2024, Russian forces continued to shell the border territories of Sumy Oblast. In particular, in the village, 2 shellings: 7 explosions, probably 122 mm artillery; 1 explosion, probably 120 mm mortar; 2 shellings: 2 explosions, probably FPV drone.

On August 27, 2024, the Operational Command North reported shelling of the village. 6 explosions were recorded, probably a 120 mm mortar; 5 shellings: 14 explosions, probably a FPV drone.

== Population ==
According to data from 1864, the state settlement of Akhtyrsky Uyezd of Kharkov Governorate had a population of 2,312 people (1,144 males and 1,168 females), 340 households, Orthodox church, sugar and saltpeter factories, and 4 annual fairs and bazaars.

As of 1914, the village belonged to the Slavhorod Volost and the number of inhabitants had increased to 7,661 people.

According to the 2001 Ukrainian census, the village's population was 909 people. The main languages of the village were:

- Ukrainian 89.97%
- Russian 9.71%
- Belarusian 0.33%

== Notable people ==
The following were born in the village:

- Antonenko Serhiy (2001 – July 23, 2023) – Ukrainian military man, participant in the War in Donbas. Awarded the Order "For Courage" 3rd degree (14.09.2023)
- Anatoly Verygin – participant in the Soviet–Afghan War, holder of the Order of the Red Star.
- Ivan Goncharenko (1911–1993) – a Ukrainian master of artistic ceramics.
- Hryhorovych Kost (1911–1993) – military and public figure, rebel, assistant commander of the armored train "Karmeliuk", commander of the armored train "Zaporozhets", secretary to the chairman of the Council of Ministers of the UNR government in exile; lieutenant of artillery of the Ukrainian People's Army.
- Mykola Danko – a Ukrainian poet, bibliophile, and one of the leaders of the resistance movement in Sumy in the 1970s and 1980s.
- Petro Sokolov (1827–1887) – a Ukrainian artist and poet.
- Alexei Khalimonov (1909–1987) – a Russian historian and teacher; a famous local historian, researcher of the history of the city of Ostrogozhsk and the Ostrogozhsky District of the Voronezh Oblast.
- Ivan Hitsenko – Hero of the Soviet Union.
