= Prilesye =

Prilesye Прилесье
- Settlement
- Location within Belgorod Oblast Location within Russia
- Coordinates: 50°52′N 35°24′E
- Country: Russia
- Region: Belgorod Oblast
- District: Krasnoyaruzhsky District
- Time zone: UTC+3:00

Prilesye (Russian: Прилесье) is a rural locality (a settlement) in Krasnoyaruzhsky District, Belgorod Oblast, Russia. The population was 128 as of 2010. There are 4 streets.

== Geography ==
Prilesye is located 24 km northwest of Krasnaya Yaruga (the district's administrative centre) by road. There is a farmstead (khutor) Liptsy just west of it, which was abandoned in 2001, while Repyakhovka is the nearest inhabited rural locality, located 4 km east by the road.
