= Marine, Sumy Oblast =

Village in Sumy Oblast, Ukraine

Marine Мар'їне
- Village
- Interactive map of Marine
- Location of Marine Marine (Ukraine)
- Coordinates: 50°55′4″N 35°22′43″E
- Country: Ukraine
- Oblast: Sumy Oblast
- Raion: Sumy Raion
- Hromada: Krasnopillia settlement hromada
- Elevation: 202 m (663 ft)

Population (2001)
  - Total: 58
- Time zone: UTC+2
  - Summer (DST): UTC+3
- Postal code: 42430
- Area code: +380 5459

Marine or Maryine is a village in Ukraine, in Krasnopillia settlement hromada, Sumy Raion, Sumy Oblast. Until 2016, the local government body was Turia Village Council.

== Geography ==
The village of Marine is located on the headwaters of the Gryazny, downstream at a distance of 3 km is the Russian village of Grafovka. At a distance of 1.5 km is the village of Prokhody. The village is located on the border with Russia.

== History ==
The village suffered as a result of the Holodomor carried out by the Soviet Union in 1923–1933 and in 1946–1947.

On June 12, 2020, in accordance with the Resolution of the Cabinet of Ministers of Ukraine No. 723-r "On the Determination of Administrative Centers and Approval of Territories of Territorial Communities of Sumy Region", it became part of the Krasnopillia settlement hromada.

On July 19, 2020, as a result of the administrative-territorial reform and liquidation of the Krasnopillia Raion, the village became part of the newly formed Sumy Raion.

According to DeepStateMap.Live, Russian forces entered the village on 14 April 2026.

== Population ==
According to the 2001 Ukrainian census, the village's population was 58 people. The main languages of the village were:

- Ukrainian 94.83%
- Russian 5.17%
