= Stepok, Sumy Oblast =

Village in Sumy Oblast, Ukraine

Stepok Степок
- Village
- Interactive map of Stepok
- Location of Stepok Stepok (Ukraine)
- Coordinates: 50°50′56″N 35°23′47″E
- Country: Ukraine
- Oblast: Sumy Oblast
- Raion: Sumy Raion
- Hromada: Krasnopillia settlement hromada
- Elevation: 196 m (643 ft)

Population (2001)
  - Total: 63
- Time zone: UTC+2
  - Summer (DST): UTC+3
- Postal code: 42437
- Area code: +380 5459

Stepok is a village in Ukraine, in Krasnopillia settlement hromada, Sumy Raion, Sumy Oblast. Until 2016, the local government body was Pokrovka Village Council.

== Geography ==
The village of Stepok is located near the sources of the Sytna River, 4 km downstream is the village of Repyakhovka, Belgorod Oblast. The Gryazny River originates in the northwest of the village. The village borders Russia.

== History ==
The village suffered as a result of the Holodomor carried out by the Soviet Union in 1923–1933 and in 1946–1947.

On June 12, 2020, in accordance with the Resolution of the Cabinet of Ministers of Ukraine No. 723-r "On the Determination of Administrative Centers and Approval of Territories of Territorial Communities of Sumy Region", it became part of the Krasnopillia settlement hromada.

On July 19, 2020, as a result of the administrative-territorial reform and liquidation of the Krasnopillia Raion, the village became part of the newly formed Sumy Raion.

=== Russo-Ukrainian War ===
On March 19, 2024, the village was twice shelled by Russian forces. The shelling was carried out by cannon artillery, 120 and 82 mm mortars, and tanks.

On July 14, 2024, the village was shelled by Russian forces. 6 explosions were recorded, probably the dropping of explosives from a UAV.

On July 16, 2024, Russian troops shelled the village. One explosion was recorded, probably a VOG drop from a UAV.

On July 28, 2024, the village was again shelled by Russian forces. 3 explosions were recorded, probably from an FPV drone.

On August 1, 2024, the village was again shelled by Russian forces. Two explosions were recorded, probably from an FPV drone.

On August 14, 2024, the Operational Command North reported that Russian forces shelled the Sumy region. 8 explosions were recorded in the village, probably 152 mm artillery.

According to DeepStateMap.Live, Russian forces captured the village on 16 April 2026.

== Population ==
According to the 2001 Ukrainian census, the village's population was 63 people. The main languages of the village were:

- Ukrainian 89.23%
- Russian 10.77%

The village was evacuated due to the Russo-Ukrainian War, with the last resident of the village, 60-year-old Oleksandr Mykolayovych, being killed by a Russian shelling in January 2024.
