= Kolotilovka =

Kolotilovka Колотиловка
- Village
- Interactive map of Kolotilovka
- Location of Kolotilovka Kolotilovka (Russia)
- Coordinates: 50.814°N 35.440°E
- Country: Russia
- Federal subject: Belgorod Oblast
- Administrative district: Krasnoyaruzhsky District

Population (2010 Census)
  - Total: 371
- Time zone: UTC+3 (MSK)
- Postal code: 309427
- OKTMO ID: 14643418101

Kolotilovka (Russian: Колотиловка) is a rural locality (a selo) and the administrative center of Kolotilovskoye Rural Settlement, Krasnoyaruzhsky District, Belgorod Oblast, Russia. The population was 371 as of 2010. It has eight streets.

== Geography ==
Kolotilovka is located 20 km west of Krasnaya Yaruga (the district's administrative centre) by road. Kolotilovka is on the border with Ukraine and the nearest rural locality is Pokrovka in Sumy Oblast, Ukraine.
