= Ilek-Penkovka =

Ilek-Penkovka Илек-Пеньковка
- Settlement
- Interactive map of Ilek-Penkovka
- Location within Belgorod Oblast Location within Russia
- Coordinates: 50°45′N 35°32′E
- Country: Russia
- Region: Belgorod Oblast
- District: Krasnoyaruzhsky District
- Time zone: UTC+3:00

Ilek-Penkovka (Russian: Илек-Пеньковка) is a rural locality (a settlement) and the administrative center of Ilek-Penkovskoye Rural Settlement, Krasnoyaruzhsky District, Belgorod Oblast, Russia. The population was 750 as of 2010. There are 14 streets.

== Geography ==
Ilek-Penkovka is located 10 km southwest of Krasnaya Yaruga (the district's administrative centre) by road. Zadorozhny is the nearest rural locality.
