= Sergiyevka, Krasnoyaruzhsky District, Belgorod Oblast =

Sergiyevka Сергиевка
- Settlement
- Interactive map of Sergiyevka
- Location within Belgorod Oblast Location within Russia
- Coordinates: 50°43′N 35°38′E
- Country: Russia
- Region: Belgorod Oblast
- District: Krasnoyaruzhsky District
- Time zone: UTC+3:00

Sergiyevka (Russian: Сергиевка) is a rural locality (a settlement) and the administrative center of Sergiyevskoye Rural Settlement, Krasnoyaruzhsky District, Belgorod Oblast, Russia. The population was 331 as of 2010. There are 5 streets.

== Geography ==
Sergiyevka is located 12 km south of Krasnaya Yaruga (the district's administrative centre) by road. Krisanovo is the nearest rural locality.
