= Lisne =

Lisne (Ukrainian: Лісне) may refer to several places in Ukraine:

== Chernihiv Oblast ==
- Lisne, Chernihiv Oblast, village in Chernihiv Raion

== Crimea ==
- Lisne, Crimea, village in Sudak Municipality

== Dnipropetrovsk Oblast ==
- Lisne, Dnipropetrovsk Oblast, village in Synelnykove Raion

== Donetsk Oblast ==
- Lisne (urban-type settlement), Donetsk Oblast, urban-type settlement in Makiivka Municipality
- Lisne, Mariupol Raion, Donetsk Oblast, rural settlement in Pokrovsk Raion
- Lisne, Volnovakha Raion, Donetsk Oblast, rural settlement in Volnovakha

== Kharkiv Oblast ==
- Lisne, Bohodukhiv Raion, Kharkiv Oblast, rural settlement in Bohodukhiv Raion
- Lisne, Chuhuiv Raion, Kharkiv Oblast, rural settlement in Chuhuiv Raion
- Lisne, Kharkiv Raion, Kharkiv Oblast, rural settlement in Kharkiv Raion

== Khmelnytskyi Oblast ==
- Lisne, Khmelnytskyi Oblast, rural settlement in Shepetivka Raion

== Kirovohrad Oblast ==
- Lisne, Holovanivsk Raion, Kirovohrad Oblast, rural settlement in Holovanivsk Raion
- Lisne, Kropyvnytskyi Raion, Kirovohrad Oblast, village in Kropyvnytskyi Raion

== Kyiv Oblast ==
- Lisne, Kyiv Oblast, village in Bucha Raion

== Luhansk Oblast ==
- Lisne, Antratsyt Municipality, Luhansk Oblast, rural settlement in Antratsyt Municipality
- Lisne, Krasnyi Luch Municipality, Luhansk Oblast, village in Krasnyi Luch Municipality
- Lisne, Lutuhyne Raion, Luhansk Oblast, rural settlement in Lutuhyne Raion

== Odesa Oblast ==
- Lisne, Odesa Oblast, village in Bolhrad Raion

== Poltava Oblast ==
- Lisne, Poltava Oblast, village in Poltava Raion

== Sumy Oblast ==
- Lisne, Okhtyrka Raion, Sumy Oblast, rural settlement in Okhtyrka Raion
- Lisne, Seredyna-Buda urban hromada, Shostka Raion, Sumy Oblast, village in Shostka Raion
- Lisne, Shostka urban hromada, Shostka Raion, Sumy Oblast, village in Shostka Raion
- Lisne, Yampil settlement hromada, Shostka Raion, Sumy Oblast, village in Shostka Raion
- Lisne, Sumy Raion, Sumy Oblast, village in Sumy Raion

== Vinnytsia Oblast ==
- Lisne, Vinnytsia Raion, Vinnytsia Oblast, village in Vinnytsia Raion

== Zaporizhzhia Oblast ==
- Lisne, Vasylivka Raion, Zaporizhzhia Oblast, village in Vasylivka Raion
- Lisne, Zaporizhzhia Raion, Zaporizhzhia Oblast, village in Zaporizhzhia Raion
