= Dumivka =

Village in Sumy Oblast, Ukraine

Dumivka Думівка
- Village
- Interactive map of Dumivka
- Location of Dumivka Dumivka (Ukraine)
- Coordinates: 50°46′47″N 35°7′9″E
- Country: Ukraine
- Oblast: Sumy Oblast
- Raion: Sumy Raion
- Hromada: Krasnopillia settlement hromada
- Elevation: 173 m (568 ft)

Population (2001)
  - Total: 105
- Time zone: UTC+2
  - Summer (DST): UTC+3
- Postal code: 42441
- Area code: +380 5459

Dumivka is a village in Ukraine, in Krasnopillia settlement hromada, Sumy Raion, Sumy Oblast. Until 2016, the local government body was Samotoivka Village Council.

== Geography ==
The village of Dumivka is located 4 km from the Syrovatka River, 2.5 km away are the villages of Samotoivka and Chernechchyna.

The Rublena River with its confluence begins in the village.

== History ==
The village of Katerynivka (now Dumivka) was founded in 1770 by Mikhail Vlasovsky on lands granted by Catherine the Great. In 1840, Semen Vlasovsky sold part of the village of Katerynivka to the owner of the village of Velykyi Bobryk, Grigory Rakhmanov. The other part went to the Podolsky landowners. The first part was located in the Velykyi Bobrytskyi volost of Sumy district, the second in the Verkhnyosyrovatskyi volost of the same district. At the end of the 19th century, the owner of the Gryaznyanskyi sugar factory, Weisse, built an estate in Katerynivka. In 1905, the estate was attacked by revolutionary workers of the factory, who demanded improved working conditions, a shorter working day and higher wages. An economy was operating to grow sugar beets for the factory. A one-class zemstvo school was opened in 1913.

According to legend, in the middle of the 19th century, the villagers of Katerynivka wrote a letter to the Duma about the difficult situation in the village. No help came, but the village received a parallel name - Dumivka, which after 1917 became the main and only official name of the village. In 1918, German troops were stationed near the village.

The village suffered as a result of the Holodomor carried out by the Soviet Union in 1923–1933 and in 1946–1947. In the 1930s, the central estate of the Budyonny collective farm was located in Dumivka, and until 1951 the village had its own village council.

After the occupation in 1941, a German cemetery (26 graves) was organized on a hill near the village, the remains of which were transferred in 2011 to a centralized German cemetery near the city of Kharkiv. In 1951, the local collective farm named after Budyonny merged with the collective farm named after the newspaper "Pravda" (village of Samotoivka).

On June 12, 2020, in accordance with the Resolution of the Cabinet of Ministers of Ukraine No. 723-r "On the Determination of Administrative Centers and Approval of Territories of Territorial Communities of Sumy Region", it became part of the Krasnopillia settlement hromada.

On July 19, 2020, as a result of the administrative-territorial reform and liquidation of the Krasnopillia Raion, the village became part of the newly formed Sumy Raion.

== Population ==
In 1976, 220 people lived in Dumivka.

According to the 2001 Ukrainian census, the village's population was 63 people. The main languages of the village were:

- Ukrainian 91.51%
- Russian 4.72%
- Romani 2.83%
- Other/Not specific 0.94%

In 2015, the population of the villlage was 37 people.

== Notable people ==
The following were born in the village:

- Oleksandr Mykolayovych Velitchenko - A Ukrainian military man who participated in the Russo-Ukrainian War.
- Kravchenko Mykola Grigorovich - A military intelligence officer, full holder of the Order of Glory, and a collective farmer.
