= Terebreno =

Terebreno Теребрено
- Selo
- Interactive map of Terebreno
- Location within Belgorod Oblast Location within Russia
- Coordinates: 50°43′N 35°30′E
- Country: Russia
- Region: Belgorod Oblast
- District: Krasnoyaruzhsky District
- Time zone: UTC+3:00

Terebreno (Russian: Теребрено) is a rural locality (a selo) and the administrative center of Terebrenskoye Rural Settlement, Krasnoyaruzhsky District, Belgorod Oblast, Russia. The population was 600 as of 2010. There are 9 streets. On 17 December 2023 Russian anti-government groups briefly entered the region to attack military positions.

== Geography ==
Terebreno is located 20 km southwest of Krasnaya Yaruga (the district's administrative centre) by road. Staroselye is the nearest rural locality.
