= Zadorozhny =

Zadorozhny Задорожный
- Settlement
- Location within Belgorod Oblast Location within Russia
- Coordinates: 50°44′N 35°32′E
- Country: Russia
- Region: Belgorod Oblast
- District: Krasnoyaruzhsky District
- Time zone: UTC+3:00

Zadorozhny (Russian: Задорожный) is a rural locality (a settlement) in Krasnoyaruzhsky District, Belgorod Oblast, Russia. The population was 120 as of 2010. There is 1 street.

== Geography ==
Zadorozhny is located 16 km southwest of Krasnaya Yaruga (the district's administrative centre) by road. Ilek-Penkovka is the nearest rural locality.
