= Lisne, Sumy Raion =

Village in Sumy Oblast, Ukraine

Lisne Лісне
- Village
- Interactive map of Lisne
- Location of Lisne Lisne (Ukraine)
- Coordinates: 50°42′12″N 35°19′47″E
- Country: Ukraine
- Oblast: Sumy Oblast
- Raion: Sumy Raion
- Hromada: Krasnopillia settlement hromada
- Elevation: 191 m (627 ft)

Population (2001)
  - Total: 181
- Time zone: UTC+2
  - Summer (DST): UTC+3
- Postal code: 42452
- Area code: +380 5459

Lisne is a village in Ukraine, in Krasnopillia settlement hromada, Sumy Raion, Sumy Oblast. Until 2016, the local government body was Riasne Village Council.

== Geography ==
The village of Lisne is located at one of the sources of the Pozhnia River, downstream at a distance of 6.5 km is the village of Mezenivka. At a distance of 2.5 km is the village of Zemliane, 4.5 km is the village of Riasne.

There is a railway station, Pyatipillya that is 5 km away.

== History ==
The village suffered as a result of the Holodomor carried out by the Soviet Union in 1923–1933 and in 1946–1947.

On June 12, 2020, in accordance with the Resolution of the Cabinet of Ministers of Ukraine No. 723-r "On the Determination of Administrative Centers and Approval of Territories of Territorial Communities of Sumy Region", it became part of the Krasnopillia settlement hromada.

On July 19, 2020, as a result of the administrative-territorial reform and liquidation of the Krasnopillia Raion, the village became part of the newly formed Sumy Raion.

== Population ==
According to the 2001 Ukrainian census, the village's population was 181 people. The main languages of the village were:

- Ukrainian 93.89%
- Russian 3.89%
- Belarusian 1.67%
- Hungarian 0.56%
- Other/Not specific 0.02%

Before the full-scale Russian invasion in 2022, the village of Lisne was home to about 70 people. Due to constant shelling by the Russian military, some of the residents were forced to leave their homes. As of June 2024, 33 people remained in the village.
