= Taratutyne =

Village in Sumy Oblast, Ukraine

Taratutyne Таратутине
- Village
- Interactive map of Taratutyne
- Location of Taratutyne Taratutyne (Ukraine)
- Coordinates: 50°43′51″N 35°22′25″E
- Country: Ukraine
- Oblast: Sumy Oblast
- Raion: Sumy Raion
- Hromada: Krasnopillia settlement hromada
- Elevation: 180 m (590 ft)

Population (2001)
  - Total: 73
- Time zone: UTC+2
  - Summer (DST): UTC+3
- Postal code: 42400
- Area code: +380 5459

Taratutyne is a village in Ukraine, in Krasnopillia settlement hromada, Sumy Raion, Sumy Oblast. Until 2016, the local government body was Krasnopillia Village Council.

== Geography ==
Located in the Musiyiv Yar gorge, 2.5 km away is the village of Novodmitrivka.

The Dovzhik River, a left tributary of the Zakobilnya River, flows through the village. The railway, the Pyatipillya station, is 2 km away.

== History ==
The village suffered as a result of the Holodomor carried out by the Soviet Union in 1923–1933 and in 1946–1947.

On June 12, 2020, in accordance with the Resolution of the Cabinet of Ministers of Ukraine No. 723-r "On the Determination of Administrative Centers and Approval of Territories of Territorial Communities of Sumy Region", it became part of the Krasnopillia settlement hromada.

On July 19, 2020, as a result of the administrative-territorial reform and liquidation of the Krasnopillia Raion, the village became part of the newly formed Sumy Raion.

=== Russo-Ukrainian War ===
On August 26, 2024, Russian invaders continued to shell the border territories of Sumy Oblast. In particular, there were 2 shellings in the village: 5 explosions, probably 122 mm artillery. By 27 April 2026, the village was captured by Russian forces.

Russian forces first entered the village on 20 July 2026.

== Population ==
According to the 2001 Ukrainian census, the village's population was 73 people. The main languages of the village were:

- Ukrainian 89.19%
- Russian 9.46%
- Other/not specified 1.35%
