= Sad, Sumy Oblast =

Village in Sumy Oblast, Ukraine

Sad Сад
- Village
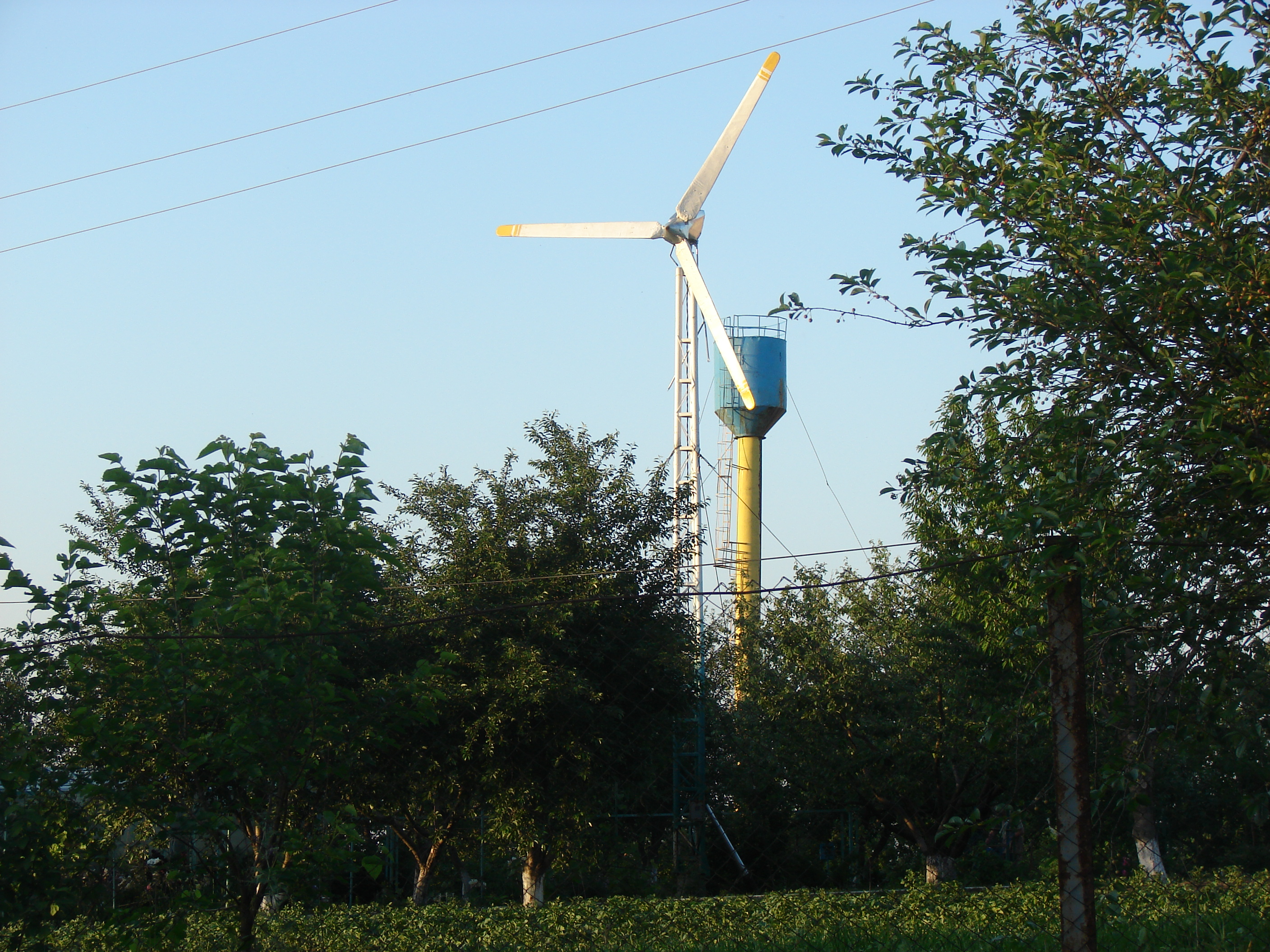
- A wind turbine outside the village

- Location of Sad in Sumy Oblast Location of Sad in Ukraine
- Coordinates: 50°53′03″N 34°42′50″E
- Country: Ukraine
- Oblast: Sumy Oblast
- Raion: Sumy Raion
- Hromada: Sad rural hromada
- Established: 1905

Population
  - Total: 2,348

Sad (Ukrainian: Сад, lit. 'garden'), known from January to February 1977 as Doslidna (Ukrainian: Дослідна, lit. 'experimental'), is a village in Sumy Raion, within Ukraine's central Sumy Oblast. It is the capital of the Sad rural hromada, one of the hromadas of Ukraine. Its population is 2,348 (as of 2024).

== History ==
The present-day village of Sad was founded in 1905 as an agricultural research centre for scientists in Kharkov Governorate. The goal of the centre was to study conditions of chernozem and forest steppe, as well as its effects on agriculture. The research centre was briefly replaced by a sovkhoz between 1930 and 1934, and ceased operations as a result of World War II between October 1941 and September 1943. The centre was reorganised into the village of Doslidne on 5 January 1977, and subsequently renamed to Sad on 16 February 1977 by a decision of the Supreme Soviet of the Ukrainian Soviet Socialist Republic.

Nadia Masalitna has been Sad's mayor since 1994, making her one of the longest-serving politicians in Ukraine's modern history, particularly among female politicians.
