= Grafovka =

Grafovka Графовка
- Settlement
- Interactive map of Grafovka
- Location within Belgorod Oblast Location within Russia
- Coordinates: 50°55′N 35°25′E
- Country: Russia
- Region: Belgorod Oblast
- District: Krasnoyaruzhsky District
- Time zone: UTC+3:00

Grafovka (Russian: Графовка) is a rural locality (a settlement) and the administrative center of Grafovskoye Rural Settlement, Krasnoyaruzhsky District, Belgorod Oblast, Russia. The population was 624 as of 2010. There are 12 streets.

== Geography ==
Grafovka is located 26 km northwest of Krasnaya Yaruga (the district's administrative centre) by road. Repyakhovka is the nearest rural locality.
