= Pavlo Hrabovsky =

Ukrainian poet and revolutionary (1864–1902)

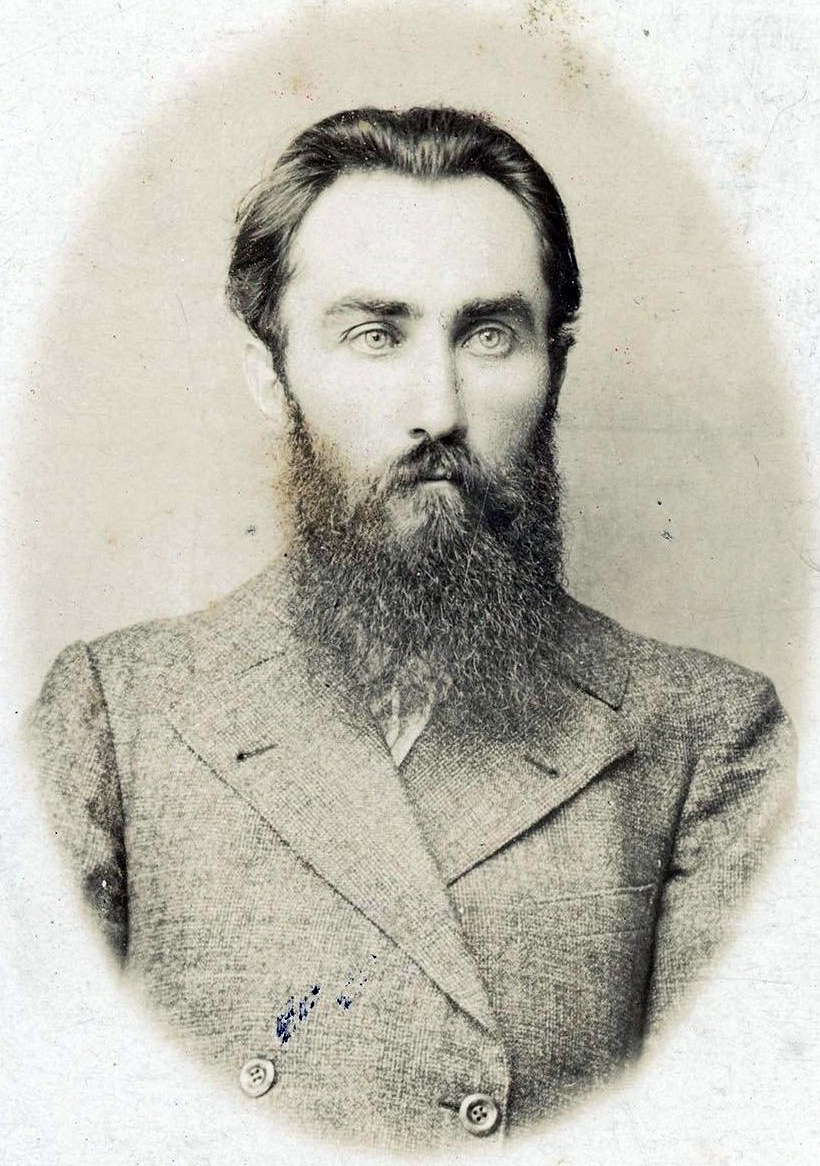
- Born: 11 September 1864 Pushkarne, Akhtyrsky Uyezd, Russian Empire
- Died: 12 December 1902 (aged 38) Tobolsk, Tobolsk Governorate, Russian Empire
- Occupation: Poet, translator, essayist, publicist

Signature
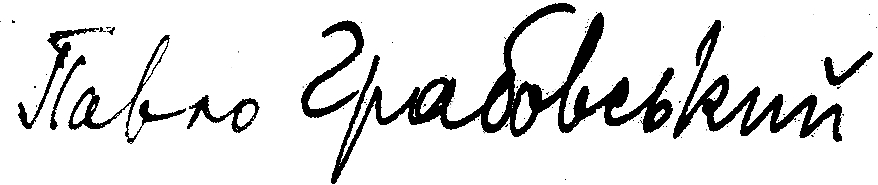

Pavlo Arsenovych Hrabovsky (Ukrainian: Павло Арсенович Грабовський; 11 September [O.S. 30 August] 1864 – 12 December [O.S. 29 November] 1902) was a Ukrainian poet, journalist, translator and revolutionary.

== Biography ==
Hrabovsky was in to the family of a village sexton. His father died while he was at a young age and was raised by his mother. He was educated at the church school in Okhtyrka and at the theological seminary in Kharkov, in the third year he was expelled for participating in the Narodnik movement (in the organization of Black Repartition) and distributing banned literature, then arrested and exiled to his native village under police supervision.

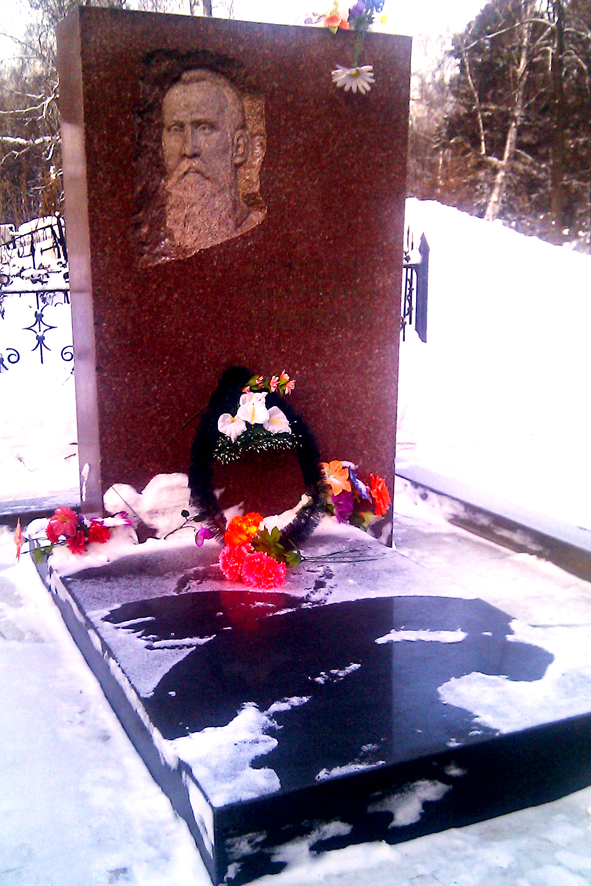
Grave of Pavlo Hrabovsky

In 1885 he went to Kharkov, where he worked as a proofreader in the newspaper "Yuzhny Krai", in the autumn of the same year he was mobilized into the army and sent to serve in the Turkestan Military District. In 1886 in Orenburg he was arrested again for distribution of illegal literature, later he was imprisoned in Izium and Kharkov. In 1888 he was sentenced to 5 years of exile in the Irkutsk Governorate. In 1889, he took part in the drafting and distribution of the "Statement to the Russian Government" against the brutal massacre of prisoners on March 22, 1889. After the text of the statement appeared in the foreign press, he was arrested and accused of drafting a political appeal. In 1889 he was arrested again and imprisoned in Irkutsk for 3.5 years.

Later he was in exile in Vilyuysk and Yakutsk, and then in Tobolsk, where he died of tuberculosis and was buried at the Zavalnoye Cemetery.

== Literary works ==
Hrabovsky was one of the representatives of Ukrainian revolutionary democratic poetry of the late 19th-century and a follower of the tradition of Taras Shevchenko. He considered literature as a means of combating injustice and social evil and was an opponent of the art for art's sake slogan. Poetry, according Hrabovsky, should be a "bold voice for all the offended and oppressed." Many of his poems are sad and were written under the impression of imprisonment. The optimistic feature of Grabovsky's poetry is hope for a better future, despite all the grief of his personal life, good nature, and a call to goodness.

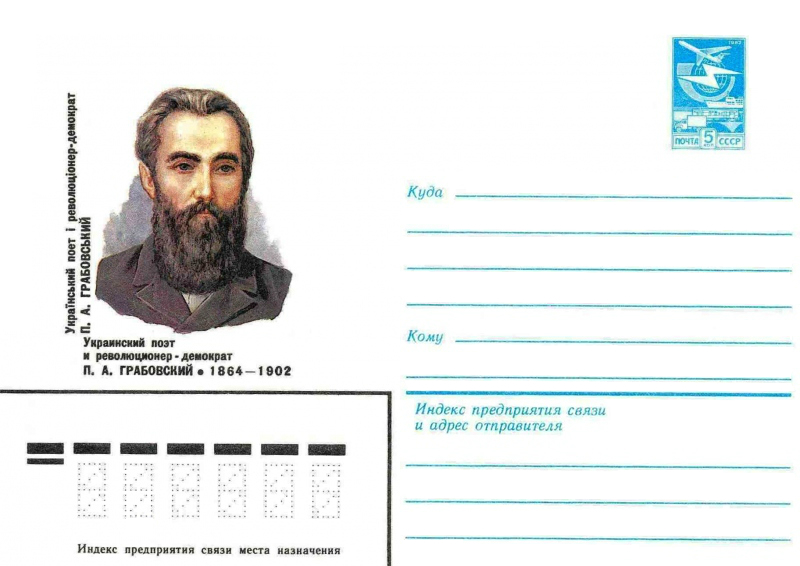
Soviet commemorative envelope with an image of Pavlo Hrabovsky, 1984

Hrabovsky is also the author of numerous translations into Ukrainian of works of world classics, such as Lord Byron, Goethe, Sándor Petőfi, Robert Burns, etc, and Russian poets (Pushkin, Lermontov, Derzhavin etc.) as well as Scandinavian and Georgian writers. He also translated Ukrainian literature into Russian.

== Personal life ==
In 1888, Hrabovsky, in the Moscow transit prison (Butyrka), met a former teacher and a member of the Narodnaya Volya, Nadezhda Malaksiano (Sigida), who was also convicted of revolutionary activity. Many of his lyrical poems are imbued with love for her; the poet dedicated his first poetry collection, Snowdrop, to her. Nadezhda Sigida died in 1889 in the Kara tragedy. Two years before his death in Tobolsk, Hrabovsky married a student of the paramedic-midwife school, Anastasia Nikolaevna Butkovskaya. In 1901, they had a son, Boris, who would later become one of the inventors of television in the Soviet Union.
