= Vysoke, Sumy Raion =

Village in Sumy Oblast, Ukraine

Vysoke Високе
- Village
- Interactive map of Vysoke
- Location of Vysoke Vysoke (Ukraine)
- Coordinates: 50°44′53″N 35°28′9″E
- Country: Ukraine
- Oblast: Sumy Oblast
- Raion: Sumy Raion
- Hromada: Krasnopillia settlement hromada
- Elevation: 196 m (643 ft)

Population (2001)
  - Total: 28
- Time zone: UTC+2
  - Summer (DST): UTC+3
- Postal code: 42450
- Area code: +380 5459

Vysoke is a village in Ukraine, in Krasnopillia settlement hromada, Sumy Raion, Sumy Oblast. Until 2016, the local government body was Hrabovske Village Council.

== Geography ==
The village of Vysoke is located near one of the sources of the Syrovatka River. A small forest, Velyky (oak), adjoins the village.

The nearest station is the Pushkarne railway station, 2 km away, and the former village of Prosiki is 1 km away.

The village borders Russia, on the Russian side the villages of Vysokoye and Pidvysoke of the Belgorod Oblast adjoin.

== History ==
The village suffered as a result of the Holodomor carried out by the Soviet Union in 1923–1933 and in 1946–1947.

On June 12, 2020, in accordance with the Resolution of the Cabinet of Ministers of Ukraine No. 723-r "On the Determination of Administrative Centers and Approval of Territories of Territorial Communities of Sumy Region", it became part of the Krasnopillia settlement hromada.

On July 19, 2020, as a result of the administrative-territorial reform and liquidation of the Krasnopillia Raion, the village became part of the newly formed Sumy Raion.

=== Russo-Ukrainian War ===
On August 14, 2024, the Operational Command North reported that the Russian forces shelled the Sumy Oblast. 1 explosion was recorded in the village, probably a KAB.

In December 2025, Russian forces clashed with Ukrainian forces for the village, which had Russian forces claimed to have captured the village.

Russian forces first entered the village on 19 January 2026. DeepStateMap.Live stated that Vysoke was captured by Russian forces on 7 March 2026. ISW confirmed the capture of the village by Russian forces on 28 May 2026.

== Population ==
According to the 2001 Ukrainian census, the village's population was 28 people. The main languages of the village were:

- Ukrainian 89.29%
- Russian 10.71%
