= Krasnopillia settlement hromada =

Urban hromada of Sumy Oblast, Ukraine

Krasnopillia settlement hromada Краснопільська селищна громада
- Hromada
- Interactive map of Krasnopillia settlement hromada
- Location within Sumy Oblast Location within Ukraine
- Coordinates: 50°46′12″N 35°16′33″E
- Country: Ukraine
- Oblast (province): Sumy Oblast
- Raion (district): Sumy Raion

Area
  - Total: 972.1 km^{2} (375.3 sq mi)

Population (2018)
  - Total: 20,760

Krasnopillia settlement hromada is a territorial hromada in Ukraine, in Sumy Raion, Sumy Oblast. Its administrative center is the city of Krasnopillia. The community area is 555.5 km^{2}, and the population is 16,044 (2018) (excluding the Turyansk village council).

The hromada was formed on December 23, 2016, by merging the Krasnopillia Village Council, Uhroidy Village Council Osoyivka Village Council, Samotoyivka Village Council, Khmelivka Village Council and Chernechchina Village Council in the Krasnopillia Raion. On March 14, 2018, as a result of voluntary accession to the community, the Turia Village Council joined into the hromada.

On July 19, 2020, as a result of the administrative-territorial reform and liquidation of the Krasnopillia Raion, the community became part of the newly formed Sumy Raion.

== Composition ==
The community includes 5 settlements (Krasnopillia, Maiske, Myropilske, Mykhailivske and Uhroidy) and 38 villages:

- Brantsivka
- Chernechchyna
- Dumivka
- Haponivka
- Hlybne
- Hrabovske
- Khmelivka
- Khvoine
- Lisne
- Lozove
- Marine
- Marchenky
- Mezenivka
- Mozkove
- Mykhailivka
- Naumivka
- Novodmytrivka
- Novooleksandrivka
- Okip
- Osoyivka
- Petrushivka
- Pokrovka
- Popivka
- Porozok
- Prokhody
- Riasne
- Samotoivka
- Slavhorod
- Stepok
- Taratutyne
- Turia
- Verkhnia Pozhnia
- Vesele
- Vidnivka
- Voropai
- Vysoke
- Yasenok
- Zemliane
