= Myropilske =

Rural settlement in Sumy Oblast, Ukraine

Myropilske Миропільське
- Rural settlement
- Interactive map of Myropilske
- Location of Myropilske Myropilske (Ukraine)
- Coordinates: 50°56′33″N 35°18′55″E
- Country: Ukraine
- Oblast: Sumy Oblast
- Raion: Sumy Raion
- Hromada: Krasnopillia settlement hromada
- Elevation: 215 m (705 ft)

Population (2001)
  - Total: 158
- Time zone: UTC+2
  - Summer (DST): UTC+3
- Postal code: 42430
- Area code: +380 5459

Myropilske is a rural settlement in Krasnopillia settlement hromada, Sumy Raion, Sumy Oblast, Ukraine. Until 2020, the local government body was the Turia Village Council.

== Geography ==
The village of Myropilske is located near the sources of the Prykil and Udava rivers. The village is bordered by small forest tracts of the Maly Prykil tract.

The border with Russia runs near the village.

== History ==
The village suffered as a result of the Holodomor carried out by the Soviet Union in 1923–1933 and in 1946–1947.

On June 12, 2020, in accordance with the Resolution of the Cabinet of Ministers of Ukraine No. 723-r "On the Determination of Administrative Centers and Approval of Territories of Territorial Communities of Sumy Region", it became part of the Krasnopillia settlement hromada.

On July 19, 2020, as a result of the administrative-territorial reform and liquidation of the Krasnopillia Raion, the village became part of the newly formed Sumy Raion.

=== Russo-Ukrainian War ===
On August 1, 2024, the village was again shelled by the Russian forces. Two explosions were recorded, probably from a 120 mm mortar.

Russian forces first entered the village on 18 April 2026. The village was captured by Russian forces on 23 April 2026.

== Population ==
According to the 2001 Ukrainian census, the village's population was 158 people. The main languages of the village were:

- Ukrainian 90.51%
- Russian 8.86%
- Moldovan (Romanian) 0.63%

As of 2023, the village has 0 residents
