= Tetyana Antypenko =

Ukrainian cross country skier (born 1981)

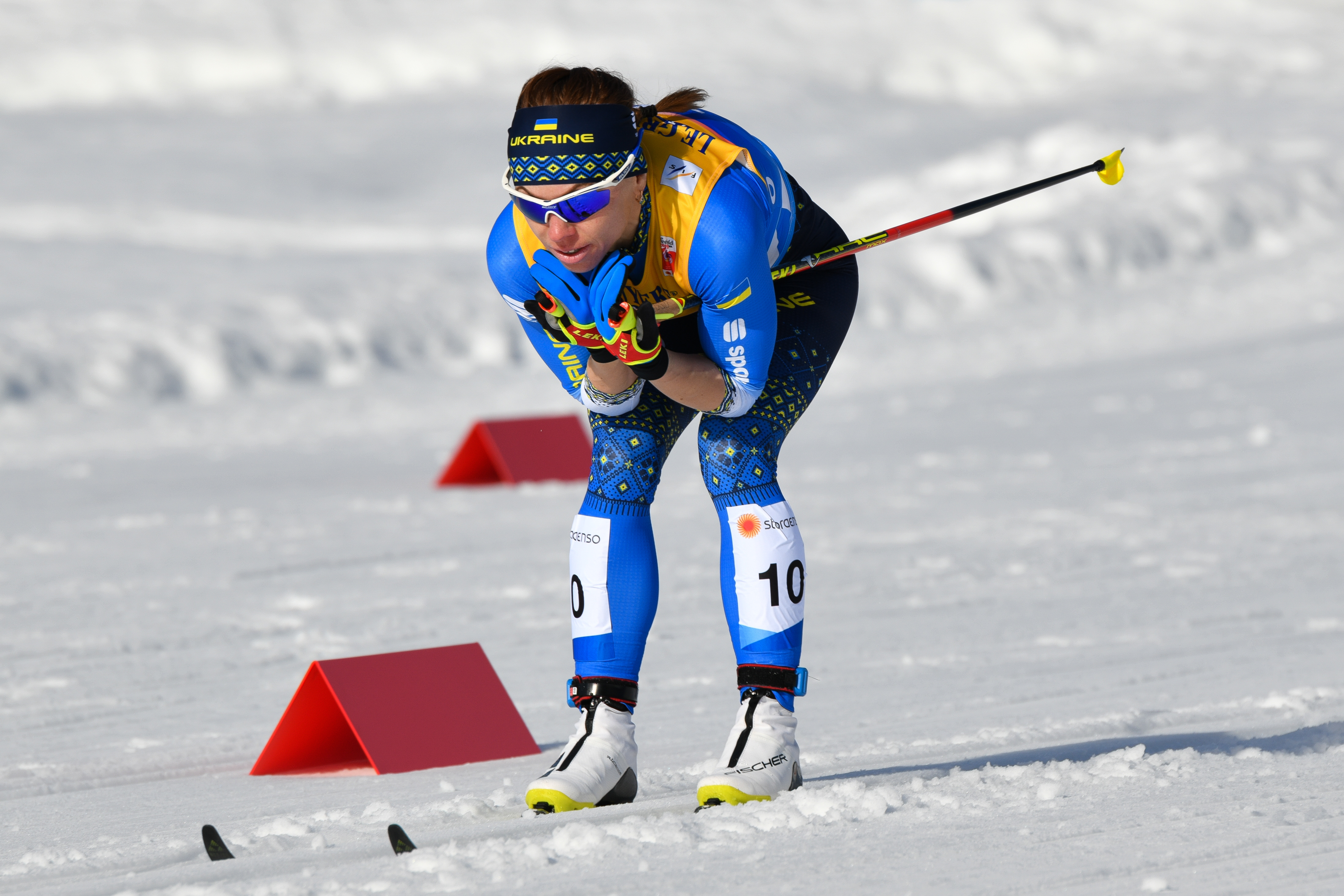

Personal information
- Full name: Антипенко (Завалій) Тетяна Миколаївна
- Born: 24 September 1981 (age 44) Uhroidy, Sumy Oblast, Ukraine
- Height: 1.58 m (5 ft 2 in)

Sport
- Sport: Skiing

World Cup career
- Seasons: 2000–
Medal record
Representing Ukraine
Women's cross-country skiing
Universiade
Silver medal – second place	2009 Harbin	Relay
- Updated on February 4, 2018

Tetyana Antypenko (née Zavalij, born 24 September 1981) is a Ukrainian cross country skier who has competed since 2000. She participated at 2006, 2010, 2014 Winter Olympics.

== Career ==
Tetiana Zavaliy was born in a small town Uhroidy, Sumy Oblast, where she took up skiing in the third form of elementary schools, since it was the only one sport section in the town.

At the FIS Cross-Country World Cup she debuted on 14 February 2004. Later she qualified for 2006 Winter Olympics. Her best personal result was 27th in 10 km classical race. She competed at 2005 World Championships which was for her the only one in the career until 2013.

On 26 February 2009, he won a silver medal in women's relay at 2009 Winter Universiade in Harbin, China.

Zavaliy competed at the 2010 Winter Olympics in Vancouver. There her best personal result was 21st in 30 km classical mass start race.

She made a pause in competitions in 2011–2012. She married and changed her surname to Antypenko. Under this surname she competed at two World championships and two Winter Olympics.

As of February 2018, her best World Cup finish was 14th in skiathlon in Russian Sochi on 2 February 2013. That was also the first season she earned some World Cup points.

== Career results ==
=== Winter Olympics ===
Year	Place	Freestyle	Skiathlon	Classical	Relay	Sprint	Team sprint
2006	Turin, Italy		45	27	8		16
2010	Vancouver, Canada		31	21	13		
2014	Sochi, Russia		51	28	12		
2018	Pyeongchang, South Korea		45			54	

=== World Championships ===
Year	Event	Freestyle	Skiathlon	Classical	Relay	Sprint	Team sprint
2005	Obersdorf, Germany	41	39	45		49	
2013	Val di Fiemme, Italy	42	30	19	10	50	
2017	Lahti, Finland		36	50	LPD	63	15

=== World Cup ===
Season	Sprint	Distance	TOTAL
2012–13		67	92
