= Novodmytrivka, Sumy Oblast =

Village in Sumy Oblast, Ukraine

Novodmytrivka Новодмитрівка
- Village
- Interactive map of Novodmytrivka
- Location of Novodmytrivka Novodmytrivka (Ukraine)
- Coordinates: 50°45′32″N 35°22′50″E
- Country: Ukraine
- Oblast: Sumy Oblast
- Raion: Sumy Raion
- Hromada: Krasnopillia settlement hromada
- Founded: 1745-1760
- Elevation: 170 m (560 ft)

Population (2001)
  - Total: 242
- Time zone: UTC+2
  - Summer (DST): UTC+3
- Postal code: 42400
- Area code: +380 5459

Novodmytrivka is a rural settlement in Krasnopillia settlement hromada, Sumy Raion, Sumy Oblast, Ukraine. Until 2020, the local government body was the Krasnopillia Village Council.

== Geography ==
The Zakobilnya River flows through the village, which flows into the Syrovatka River 10 km later. The village of Krasnopillia is located 2 km downstream.

Several streams flow through the village, which dry up with rapids. A large forest (oak) adjoins the village. There are 2 schools and a dairy farm in the village.

== History ==
The approximate year of foundation is 1745-1760, but definitely not later than 1760. The Central State Historical Archives of Ukraine in Kyiv stores the metric books and confessional records from 1760-1801 of the village of "Zakobyllya". Novodmytrivka was called Zakobylya until 1923.

The village had its own church, but during the peak of the anti-religious board of Nikita Khrushchev in 1958, the church was destroyed. It is not known exactly when the church was built, but it was definitely no later than 1760. Initially, the church was named after Sergius of Radonezh, but after the rededication it became known as Georgievsky.

The village suffered as a result of the Holodomor carried out by the Soviet Union in 1923–1933 and in 1946–1947.

On June 12, 2020, in accordance with the Resolution of the Cabinet of Ministers of Ukraine No. 723-r "On the Determination of Administrative Centers and Approval of Territories of Territorial Communities of Sumy Region", it became part of the Krasnopillia settlement hromada.

On July 19, 2020, as a result of the administrative-territorial reform and liquidation of the Krasnopillia Raion, the village became part of the newly formed Sumy Raion.

Russian forces first entered the village on 28 May 2026.

== Population ==
According to the 2001 Ukrainian census, the village's population was 242 people. The main languages of the village were:

- Ukrainian 93.80%
- Russian 6.20%

In 2023, several dozen residents remained in the village.
