= Repyakhovka =

Repyakhovka Репяховка
- Selo
- Location within Belgorod Oblast Location within Russia
- Coordinates: 50°51′N 35°28′E
- Country: Russia
- Region: Belgorod Oblast
- District: Krasnoyaruzhsky District
- Time zone: UTC+3:00

Repyakhovka (Russian: Репяховка) is a rural locality (a selo) and the administrative center of Repyakhovskoye Rural Settlement, Krasnoyaruzhsky District, Belgorod Oblast, Russia. The population was 777 as of 2010. There are 12 streets.

== Geography ==
Repyakhovka is located 18 km northwest of Krasnaya Yaruga (the district's administrative centre) by road. Grafovka is the nearest rural locality.
