= Lisne, Crimea =

Lisne Лісне
- Village
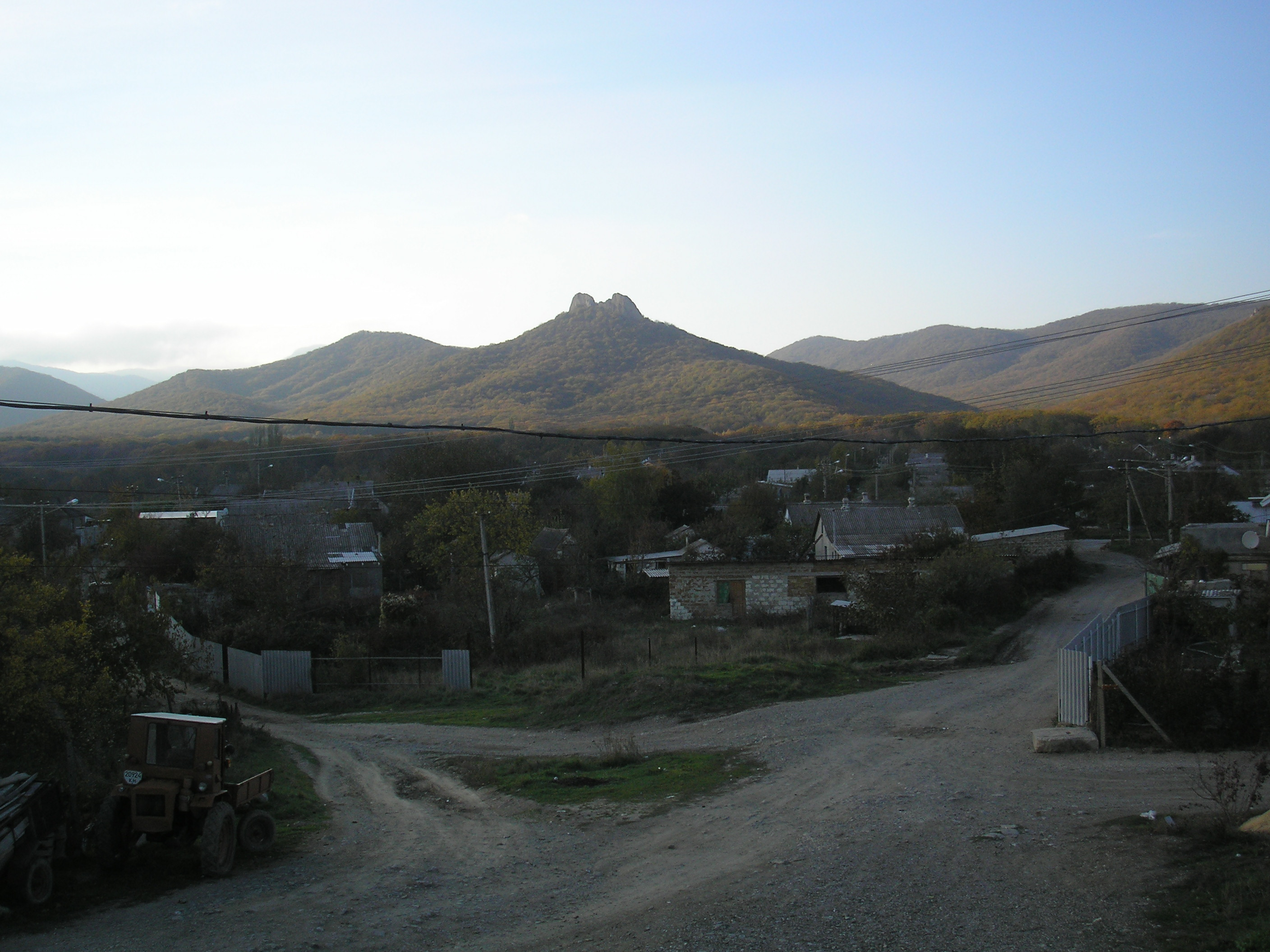
- View of Lisne with the Crimean Mountains in the background.

- Location of Lisne in Crimea
- Coordinates: 44°56′27″N 34°57′16″E
- Country: Ukraine (occupied by Russia)
- Autonomous republic: Crimea (de jure)
- Raion: Feodosia Raion (de jure)
- Federal subject: Crimea (de facto)
- Municipality: Sudak Municipality (de facto)
- First mentioned: 1667
- Elevation: 250 m (820 ft)

Population (2014)
  - Total: 610
- Time zone: UTC+4 (MSK)
- Postal code: 98024
- Area code: +380 6566
- Website: http://rada.gov.ua/

Lisne or Lesnoye (Ukrainian: Лісне; Russian: Лесное) is a village in the Sudak Municipality of the Crimea, a territory recognized by a majority of countries as part of Ukraine and annexed by Russia as the Republic of Crimea.

Lisne is located on Crimea's southern shore in the Crimean Mountains at an elevation of 250 m (820 ft). Its population was 581 in the 2001 Ukrainian census. Current population: 610 (2014 Census).

== History ==
During the 1680s in an Ottoman register of land holdings, the village, which was referred to as Soguksu, was part of the Sudak kadylyk in the Kefe Eyalet. According to the register, there were 19 landowners in the towns, 17 of them were native to the village, and in total they owned 864 Dunams of land.

Previously, the settlement was known as the Suuk-Su village (Crimean Tatar: Suvuq Suv). Following the forced deportation of the Crimean Tatars in 1944, the Presidium of the Supreme Soviet of the Russian SFSR published a decree on May 18, 1948, renaming the settlement along with many others throughout Crimea from their native Crimean Tatar names to their current variants.

== Geography ==
Transport for the city of Lisne is done through the regional highway 35K-006 Grushevka - Sudak according to Russia, or regional highway 35 Simferopol - Sevastopol - Gluboky Yar, according to Ukraine. It is located 65 km from the nearest railway station at Feodosia.

As of 2018, there are 12 streets in the city. As of 2009, the village area was 41.6 hectares with a population of 549 people and a number of households more than 300.

== Demographics ==
Native language according to the 2001 Ukrainian census:

- Russian: 54%
- Crimean Tatar: 24.8%
- Ukrainian: 19.4%
- Belarusian: 0.2%
- "Moldovan" (Romanian): 0.2%
- Others: 1.4%
