= Pokachevo =

Pokachevo Почаево
- Selo
- Interactive map of Pokachevo
- Location within Belgorod Oblast Location within Russia
- Coordinates: 50°38′N 35°32′E
- Country: Russia
- Region: Belgorod Oblast
- District: Grayvoronsky District
- Time zone: UTC+3:00

Pokachevo (Russian: Почаево) is a rural locality (a selo) in Grayvoronsky District, Belgorod Oblast, Russia. The population was 692 as of 2010. There are 11 streets.

== Geography ==
Pokachevo is located 25 km northwest of Grayvoron (the district's administrative centre) by road. Sankovo and Smorodino are the nearest rural localities.
