= Porozok =

Porozok Порозок
- Village
- Interactive map of Porozok
- Location of Porozok within Ukraine Porozok (Sumy Oblast)
- Coordinates: 50°33′31″N 35°22′24″E
- Country: Ukraine
- Oblast: Sumy Oblast
- Raion: Sumy Raion
- Hromada: Krasnopillia settlement hromada
- Founded: 1660
- Elevation: 135 m (443 ft)

Population (2001 census)
  - Total: 533
- Time zone: UTC+2 (EET)
  - Summer (DST): UTC+3 (EEST)
- Postal code: 42457
- Area code: +380 5459
- KATOTTH: UA59080090290069917

Porozok (Ukrainian: Порозок; Russian: Порозок) is a village in Krasnopillia settlement hromada, Sumy Raion, Sumy Oblast, Ukraine. It is located 55.87 kilometres (34.72 mi) southeast (SE) from the centre of Sumy city.

== Geography ==
The village is located on the left bank of the Pozhnia river at the confluence of the Porozok river. The absolute height is 135 metres above sea level.

== History ==
Date of foundation — 1660.

=== Russian invasion of Ukraine ===
Porozok came under fire of Russian forces on multiple occasions.

== Demographics ==
As of the 2001 Ukrainian census, the settlement had 533 inhabitants, whose native languages were 18.54% Ukrainian and 81.46% Russian.
