= Krasnopillia, Sumy Oblast =

Rural locality in Sumy Oblast, Ukraine

Krasnopillia
- Rural settlement

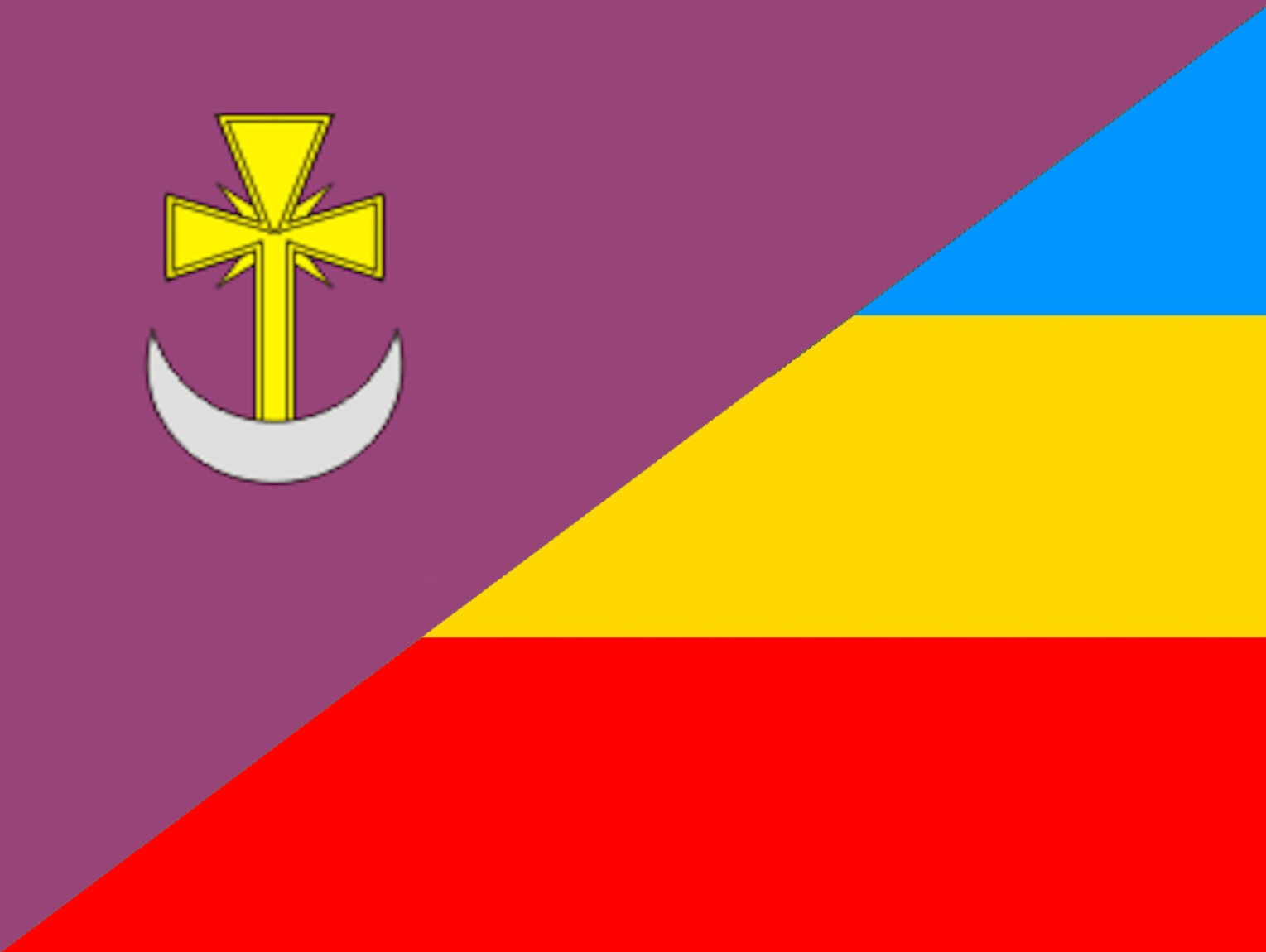
- Flag Seal
- Interactive map of Krasnopillia
- Location of Krasnopilla in Sumy Oblast Location of Krasnopilla in Ukraine
- Coordinates: 50.7732°N 35.2717°E
- Country: Ukraine
- Oblast: Sumy Oblast
- Raion: Sumy Raion
- Hromada: Krasnopillia settlement hromada
- Established: 1640

Area
  - Total: 146 km^{2} (56 sq mi)
- Elevation: 175 m (574 ft)

Population (2022)
  - Total: 7,769
  - Density: 53.2/km^{2} (138/sq mi)
- Time zone: UTC+2 (EET)
  - Summer (DST): UTC+3 (EEST)
- Post Code: 42400
- Area code: +380 5459
- KATOTTH: UA59080090010070278

Krasnopillia (Ukrainian: Краснопілля) is a rural settlement in Sumy Raion, Sumy Oblast, Ukraine, located in the historic region of Sloboda Ukraine. It hosts the administration of Krasnopillia settlement hromada, one of the hromadas of Ukraine. The settlement is 42 km (26 mi) away from Sumy, the regional center, and has a population of 7,769 (2022 estimate).

== Geography ==
Krasnopillia is located on the banks of the Syrovatka River, which is a left tributary of the Psel River, at the confluence of the Gryaznaya River. Krasnopillia is situated in a close proximity to the Russia–Ukraine border. Upstream is the village of Mikhailovka; downstream, 3 km away, are the villages of Samotoyevka and Taratutyne.

== History ==
People began settling in the territory of modern-day Krasnopolye a very long time ago, as evidenced by the discovery of settlements dating back to the Bronze Age and early Iron Age. The town appeared in 1640 as a fort of the Belgorod Defense Line which Russian forces erected in Sloboda Ukraine to secure southern borders of the Tsardom of Russia from raids of Crimean Tatars and Nogais. Around 1640, a fortified settlement, Krasnopolye, was built. It was constructed and guarded by Russian servicemen. Beginning in 1651, the settlement grew rapidly, with many peasants and Cossacks from Right-Bank Ukraine settling here. While serving in regimental and municipal service, they were granted the right to occupy vacant lands and own them tax-free. With the influx of Ukrainians, the principles of Cossack self-government were established in Krasnopolye.

Eventually in the late 1650s, the town developed into a district center of the Sumy Cossack Regiment which also served as a regional subdivision of the Sloboda Ukraine. Military and administrative affairs in the hundred were handled by the hundred-strong elder. The voivode led the Russian population and was in charge of the fortress's military affairs. Krasnopolye eventually acquired greater defensive and border significance. By 1673, 1,136 people lived here, and the fortress itself was a significant fortification. The walls were 3,294 fathoms long, with two gate towers and 12 blind towers rising above them. In case of siege, there was a secret passage leading to the Tonkaya River. The Cossacks had three arquebuses with cannonballs at their disposal. Krasnopolye repeatedly experienced hostile attacks.

In 1659, the Tatars robbed and captured many people from the Krasnopolye hundred. They also attacked in 1663 and 1668. The courage and zeal of the fortress's defenders are evidenced by the mounds, some of which have survived to this day. Krasnopolye's defensive importance declined in the first quarter of the 18th century due to the shift of the Russian state's borders far to the south. The Russian voivode left the town, and maintenance of the fortification ceased. By 1718, it no longer had either troops or artillery

After disbanding the regimental administrative division in 1765, Krasnopillia became a sloboda and a seat of volost (a county subdivision). The main occupation of the local residents became agriculture, and to a lesser extent, cattle breeding and distilling. At the end of the 18th century, over 2,400 state peasants and about 800 serfs lived in Krasnopolye and its surrounding settlements. Sixty years later, the number of state peasants increased to 3,560, and the number of serfs to 836.

In 1886, the population was 5,656, and in 1913, 7,468. The Belgorod Railway, construction of which began in 1898, contributed to Krasnopolye's economic development. The first train passed through railway station on August 2, 1901.

Since the 1920s, it has been a district center. The town suffered from the Soviet Holodomor in Ukraine. During World War II it was under German occupation from October 15, 1941 to 1943. In 1956, it was granted the status of urban-type settlement. In 1973, a butter factory, a bakery, a furniture factory, and an incubator station operated here.

In January 1989 the population was 9,469 people (4,326 men and 5,143 women). In January 2013 the population was 8355 people. Until 2020, it was the administrative seat of Krasnopillia Raion, but is now within Sumy Raion.

During the first days of the Russian invasion of Ukraine, large columns of Russian military vehicles frequently passed through Krasnopillia. On 26 January 2024, a new law entered into force which abolished the urban-type settlement status, and Krasnopillia became a rural settlement.

== Economy ==
- Bread factory;
- Krasnopolsk grain receiving enterprise, LLC;
- Krasnopolsk state forestry;
- Krasnopolsk Avtodor branch;
- Kolos farm.

== Social sphere ==
- School;
- Vocational School No. 43;
- Club;
- Community Center;
- Grammar School.

== Transportation ==
Krasnopillia railway station is located on the railway which connects Sumy and Belgorod in Russia crossing the Russian border in Pushkarne. There is infrequent local traffic between Sumy and Pushkarne. There is no passenger traffic across the border.

== Notable people ==
- Oleksandr Lebedenko (born 1989), footballer
- Valentyna Semerenko (born 1986), biathlete
- Vita Semerenko (born 1986), biathlete
