= Akhtyrsky Uyezd =

Okhtyrsky Uyezd
- Former subdivision of the Russian Empire
- 1780–1923
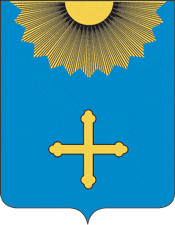
- Coat of arms

- Capital: Okhtyrka
- Population
  - (1897): 161 234
- History
  - Established: 1780
  - Disestablished: 1923
Preceded by
Okhtyrka Regiment

Akhtyrsky Uyezd (Russian: Ахтырский уезд, Ukrainian: Охтирський повіт) was an uyezd (district) in the Kharkov Governorate of the Russian Empire, Ukrainian State and Soviet Ukraine

== History ==
This uyezd was created on April 25, 1780 by order of the Empress Catherine the Great. Since September 1781, Akhtyrka got its own coat of arms.

The uyezd had one town (Okhtyrka) and consisted of 13 volosts.

In the early 1890s, construction of a chaussee began through the uyezd.

In 1895, Akhtyrka railway station was built.

By the Soviet administrative reform of 1923, the uyezd was merged with Bogodukhov uyezd into Bogodukhov okrug.

== Demographics ==
At the time of the Russian Empire Census of 1897, Akhtyrsky Uyezd had a population of 161,243. Of these, 87.6% spoke Ukrainian, 11.3% Russian, 0.5% Belarusian, 0.2% Yiddish, 0.1% Polish and 0.1% German as their native language.

== Sources ==
- Ахтырка // Энциклопедический словарь Брокгауза и Ефрона : в 86 т. (82 т. и 4 доп.). — Т. 2А. СПб., 1891.
