= Krasnoyaruzhsky District =

Krasnoyaruzhsky District Краснояружский район (Russian)
- District
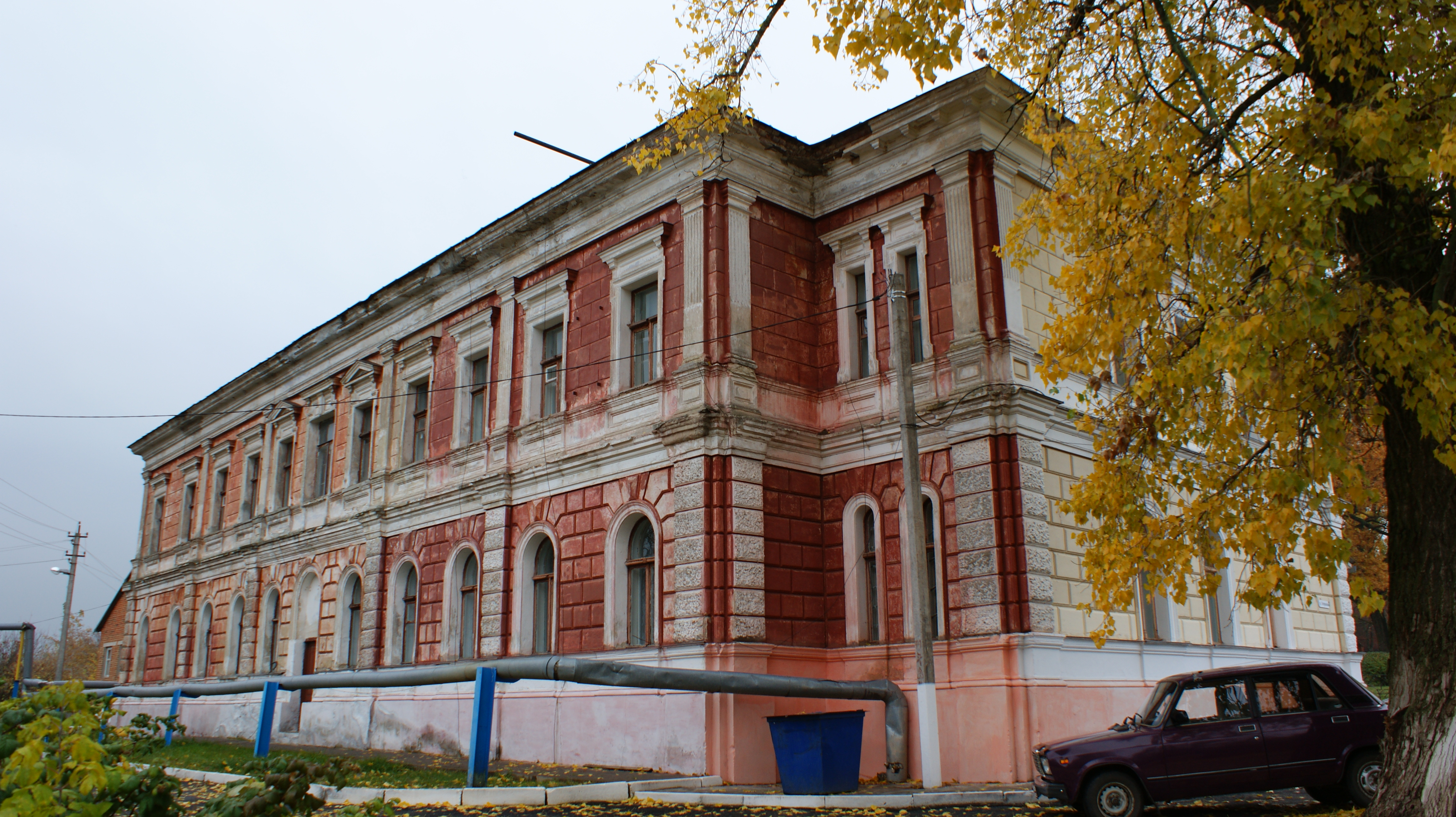
- Kharitonenko House, Krasnaya Yaruga

- Flag Coat of arms
- Location of Krasnoyaruzhsky District in Belgorod Oblast
- Coordinates: 50°48′N 35°39′E
- Country: Russia
- Federal subject: Belgorod Oblast
- Established: 30 July 1928
- Administrative center: Krasnaya Yaruga

Area
  - Total: 479.2 km^{2} (185.0 sq mi)

Population (2010 Census)
  - Total: 14,891
  - Density: 31.07/km^{2} (80.48/sq mi)
  - Urban: 53.9%
  - Rural: 46.1%

Administrative structure
  - Inhabited localities: 1 urban-type settlements, 33 rural localities

Municipal structure
  - Municipally incorporated as: Krasnoyaruzhsky Municipal District
  - Municipal divisions: 1 urban settlements, 7 rural settlements
- Time zone: UTC+3 (MSK)
- OKTMO ID: 14643000
- Website: http://www.yaruga.belnet.ru/

Krasnoyaruzhsky District (Russian: Краснояру́жский райо́н) is an administrative district (raion), one of the twenty-one in Belgorod Oblast, Russia. Municipally, it is incorporated as Krasnoyaruzhsky Municipal District. It is located in the west of the oblast, on the border with Ukraine. Its administrative center is the urban locality (an urban-type settlement) of Krasnaya Yaruga. Population: 14,151 (2021 census); 14,891 (2010 census); 15,128 (2002 Census). The population of Krasnaya Yaruga accounts for 56.2% of the district's total population.

== History ==
For a long time, Krasnaya Yaruga belonged to the Khotmyzhsky District, which was initially part of the Kharkov Viceroyalty (province), and then, in the early 19th century, was incorporated into the Kursk Governorate .

In 1928, when the Belgorod Okrug of the Central Black Earth Oblast was formed, Krasnoyarsk District was created within it, incorporating the lands of Graivorovsky Uyezd. In 1934, the district's lands became part of Kursk Oblast. Upon its creation on January 6, 1954, Krasnoyarsk District was transferred to the newly formed Belgorod Oblast . In 1963, the district was merged with Rakityansky District .

The district was restored to its current borders on April 22, 1991 by Decree No. 1054-1 of the Presidium of the Supreme Soviet of the RSFSR . The administrative center of the district is the urban-type settlement of Krasnaya Yaruga.

Since January 1, 2006, in accordance with the Law of the Belgorod Region dated December 20, 2004, No. 159, the municipal formation "Krasnoyarugsky District" was granted the status of a municipal district . Eight municipal formations were formed on the territory of the district: one urban settlement and seven rural settlements.

On 12 August 2024, evacuation of the civilian population from the Krasnoyaruzsky district was begun due to "enemy activity", according to the governor of Belgorod region, Vyacheslav Gladkov, as a result of the Ukrainian military incursion during the Russo-Ukrainian War. He claimed 11 thousands have left the district, which is approximately three quarters of the population of the district.

== Geography ==
Krasnoyaruzhsky District sits at the western edge of Belgorod Oblast, on the border with Ukraine. It is bordered on the south by Grayvoronsky District, on the west by Sumy Oblast in Ukraine, on the north by Belovsky District, Kursk Oblast, and on the east by Rakityansky District. The administrative center of the district is the town of Krasnaya Yaruga. The district is 55 kilometres (34 mi) west of the city of Belgorod, and is 55 kilometres (34 mi) northwest of the Ukrainian city of Kharkiv.

The area of the district is 479.2 square kilometers (185.0 sq mi). The terrain is hilly plain averaging 200 metres (660 ft) above sea level; the district lies on the Orel-Kursk plateau of the Central Russian Upland.
