= Krasnaya Yaruga =

Krasnaya Yaruga Красная Яруга
- Town
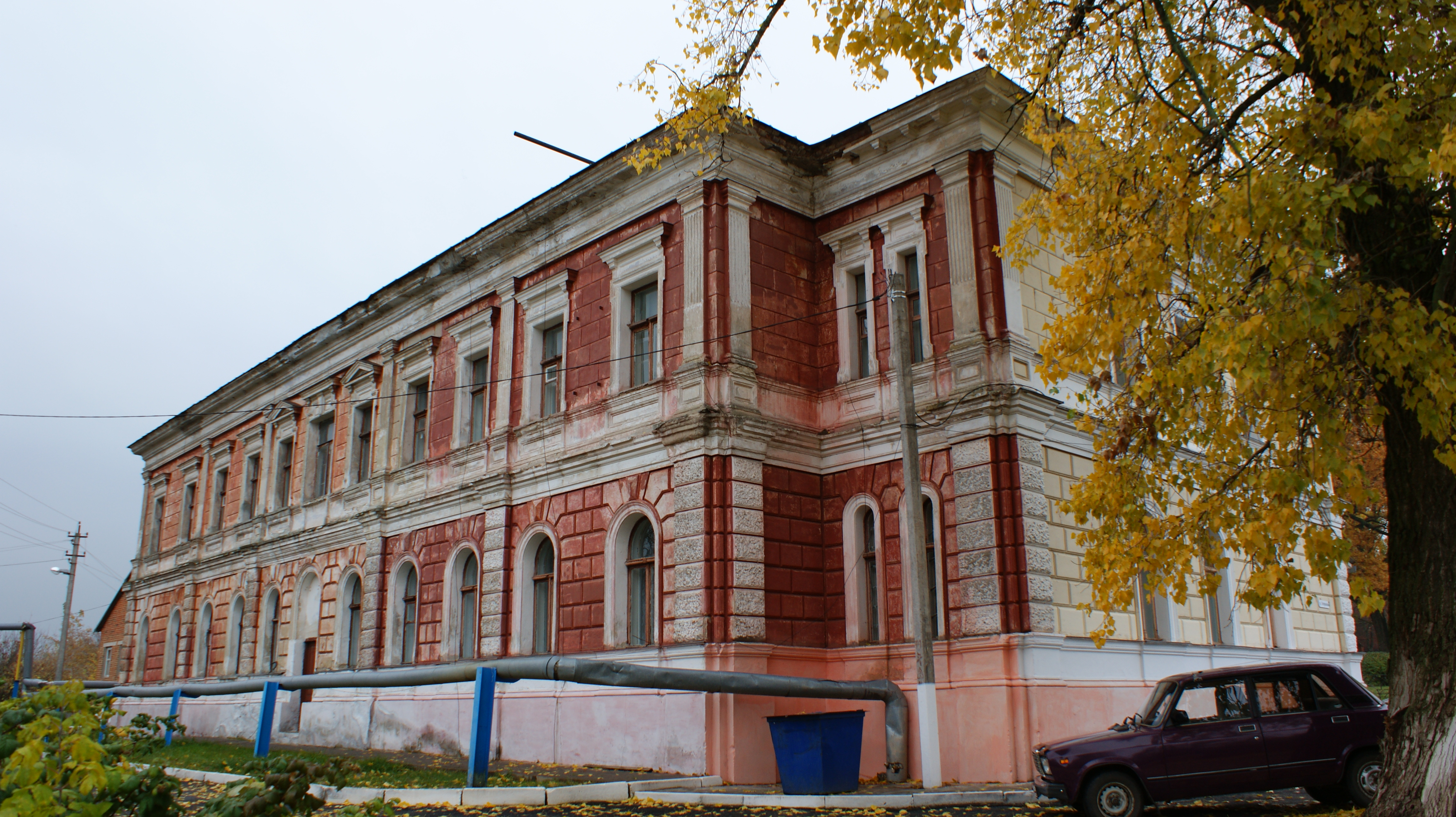
- Kharitonenko House in the town

- Flag Coat of arms
- Interactive map of Krasnaya Yaruga
- Location of Krasnaya Yaruga Krasnaya Yaruga (Belgorod Oblast)
- Coordinates: 50°48′00″N 35°39′00″E
- Country: Russia
- Federal subject: Belgorod Oblast
- First mentioned: 1681
- Town status since: 1958

Population (2010 Census)
  - Total: 8,028
  - Estimate (1 January 2024): 7,937 (−1.1%)

Municipal status
  - Municipal district: Krasnoyaruzhsky Municipal District
  - Urban settlement: Krasnoyaruzhsky Urban Settlement
  - Capital of: Krasnoyaruzhsky Municipal District, Krasnoyaruzhsky Urban Settlement
- Time zone: UTC+3 (MSK)
- Postal code: 309420
- Dialing code: +7 47263
- OKTMO ID: 14643151051

Krasnaya Yaruga (Russian: Кра́сная Яру́га) is an urban-type settlement in Belgorod Oblast in Russia. Population: 7,957 (2021 census); 8,028 (2010 census); 7,823 (2002 census); 7,221 (1989 Soviet census).

== Geography ==
The village is located 4 kilometres (2.5 mi) from the railway station Sveklovichnaya (Russian: Свекловичная) on the Belgorod - Sumy line.

== History ==
The town was first mentioned in 1681. In 1874, a well-known industrialist IG Kharitonenko built a sugar factory in the town. Status of urban-type settlement was granted in 1958. The village is the birthplace of the Hero of the Soviet Union Grigory Tkachenko.
