= Krasnopillia Raion =

Former subdivision of Sumy Oblast, Ukraine

Krasnopillia Raion Краснопільський район
- Raion
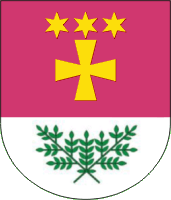
- Flag Coat of arms

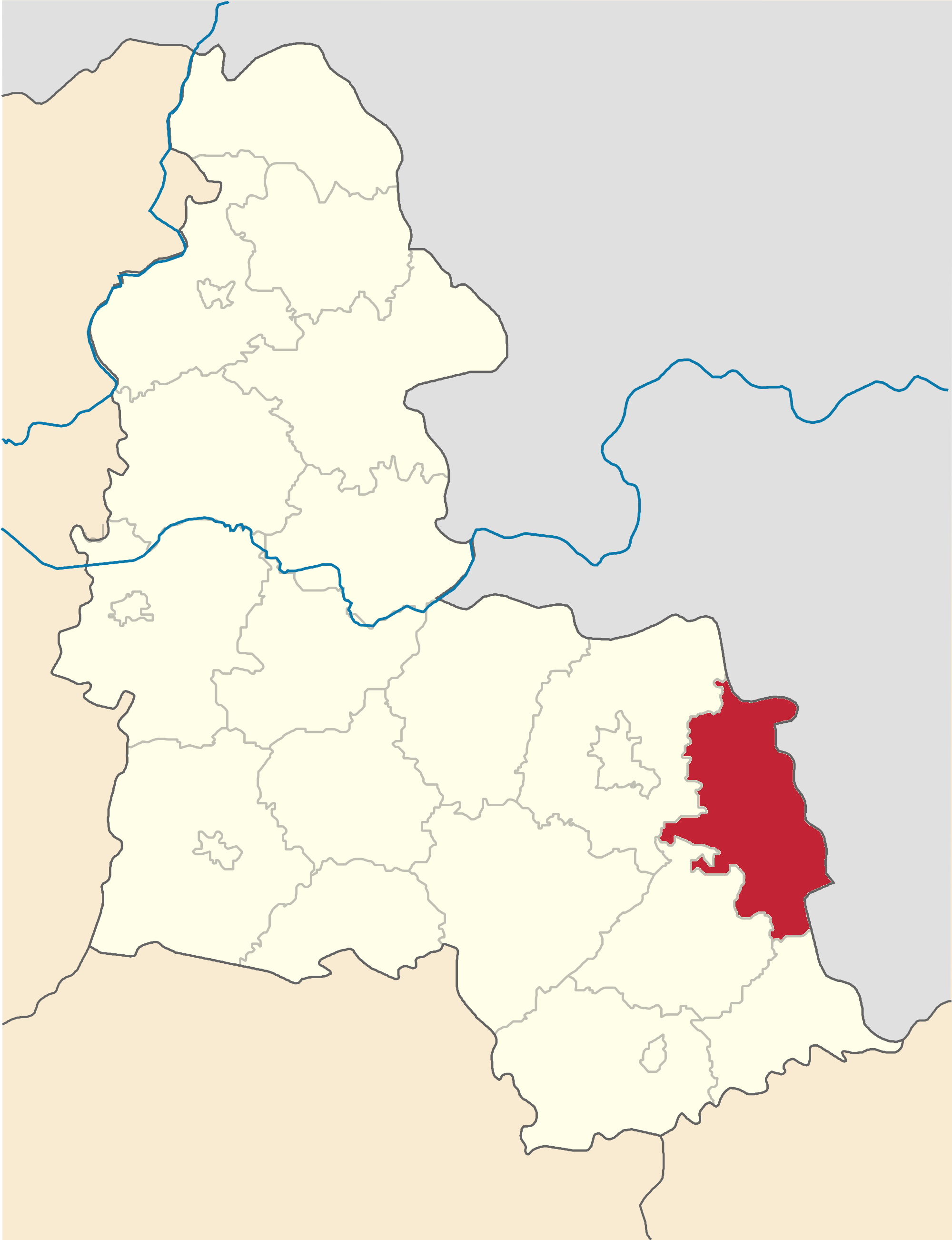
- Raion location in Sumy Oblast
- Coordinates: 50°48′36.0216″N 35°14′20.4144″E
- Country: Ukraine
- Oblast: Sumy Oblast
- Disestablished: 18 July 2020
- Admin. center: Krasnopillia

Area
  - Total: 1,350 km^{2} (520 sq mi)

Population (2020)
  - Total: 26,988
  - Density: 20.0/km^{2} (51.8/sq mi)
- Time zone: UTC+2 (EET)
  - Summer (DST): UTC+3 (EEST)
- Website: http://krasrada.sumy.ua/

Krasnopillia Raion (Ukrainian: Краснопільський район) was a raion in Sumy Oblast, Central Ukraine. The administrative center of the raion was the urban-type settlement of Krasnopillia. The raion was abolished on 18 July 2020 as part of the administrative reform of Ukraine, which reduced the number of raions of Sumy Oblast to five. The last estimate of the raion population was 26,988 (2020 est.).
