= Sumy Raion =

Subdivision of Sumy Oblast, Ukraine

Sumy Raion Сумський район
- Raion
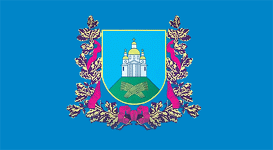
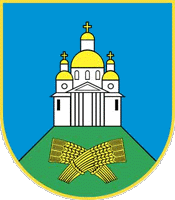
- Flag Coat of arms

- Raion location in Sumy Oblast
- Coordinates: 51°1′32.8944″N 34°51′39.7152″E
- Country: Ukraine
- Oblast: Sumy Oblast
- Admin. center: Sumy
- Subdivisions: 16 hromadas

Area
  - Total: 6,503.7 km^{2} (2,511.1 sq mi)

Population (2022)
  - Total: 434,316
  - Density: 66.780/km^{2} (172.96/sq mi)
- Time zone: UTC+2 (EET)
  - Summer (DST): UTC+3 (EEST)
- Website: http://sumy-region.gov.ua/

Sumy Raion (Ukrainian: Сумський район, romanized: Sumskyi raion) is a raion (district) in Sumy Oblast in central Ukraine. The administrative center of the raion is the city of Sumy, which was formerly administratively incorporated as a city of oblast significance until 2020. Population: 434,316 (2022 estimate).

On 18 July 2020, as part of the administrative reform of Ukraine, the number of raions of Sumy Oblast was reduced to five, and the area of Sumy Raion was significantly expanded. The January 2020 estimate of the raion population was 61,836 (2020 est.).

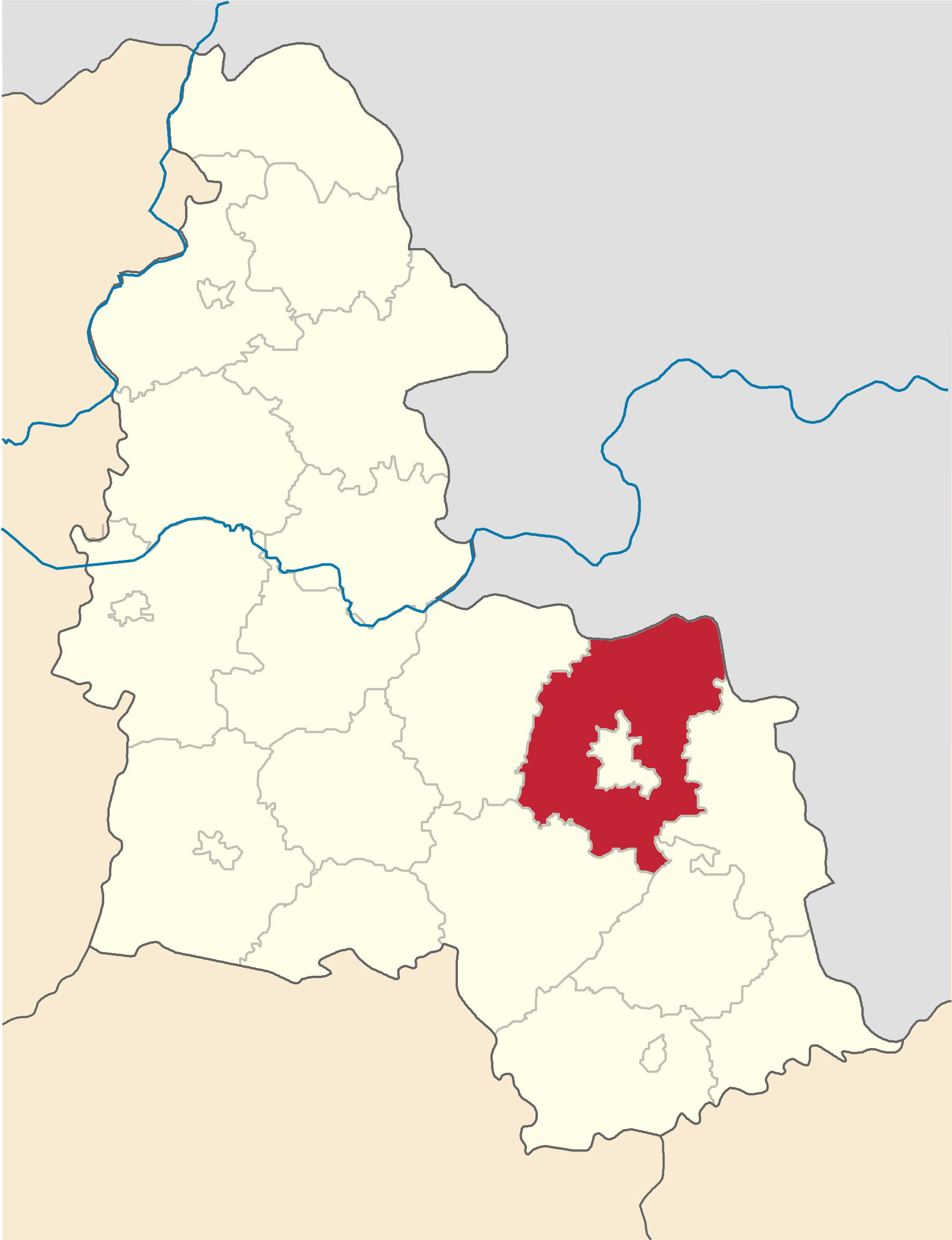
Location of Sumy Raion prior to the 2020 administrative reforms

== Geographic characteristics ==
The area of the district is 6503.7 km^{2}. Sumy Raion is located on the slopes of the Central Russian Upland.

The climate is moderately continental. Winter is cool, summer is not hot. The average temperature in July is +19 °C, in January -7.5 °C. The maximum precipitation falls in the summer in the form of rain. The average annual amount is from 650 to 700 mm, changing from west to east.

Psel, left tributary of the Dnipro flow through the Sumy Raion. The river in the floodplain has many oxbow lakes and artificial lakes.

Sumy Raion is located in the forest-steppe natural zone. Among the trees in the forests, oaks, lindens, and maples dominate. Typical large mammals are elk, roe deer, wild boar, squirrels, beavers, hares and wolves. The most common soils in the area are typical black earths, gray, meadow, and meadow-bog soils.

Sumy Raion has reserves of clay, sapropel, phosphorite.

=== Environmental protection activities ===
In the Sumy Raion, the Michael's Virgin Land Nature Reserve, the Kyianytskyi Park is a monument of landscape architecture of national importance, the Banny Yar and Srednoseymsky nature reserves of national importance are located. Animals and plants listed in the Red Book of Ukraine that are found in the territory of the Sumy Raion: Adonis vernalis, Pulsatilla patens, Stipa capillata, Greater blind mole-rat, Great jerboa. Among the rare bird species, there are the gray magpie, Montagu's harrier, Common kestrel, and woodcock.

== Hromadas of the raion ==
There are 450 hromadas in Sumy Oblast. The number of cities is 4. Sumy Raion includes 16 hromadas, namely: Sumy, Bilopillia, Vorozhba, Lebedyn urban hromadas; Krasnopillia, Mykolaivka, Stepanivka, Khotin settlement hromadas; and Bezdryk, Verkhnia Syrovatka, Mykolaivka, Myropillia, Nyzhnia Syrovatka, Richky, Sad, Yunakivka rural hromadas.

== Bibliography ==
- Національний атлас України/НАН України, Інститут географії, Державна служба геодезії, картографії та кадастру; голов. ред. Л. Г. Руденко; голова ред. кол.Б.Є. Патон. — К.: ДНВП «Картографія», 2007. — 435 с. — 5 тис.прим. — ISBN 978-966-475-067-4.
- Географічна енциклопедія України : [у 3 т.] / редкол.: О. М. Маринич (відповід. ред.) та ін. — К., 1989—1993. — 33 000 екз. — ISBN 5-88500-015-8.
