= Mohrytsia =

Village in Sumy Oblast, Ukraine

Mohrytsia Могриця
- Village
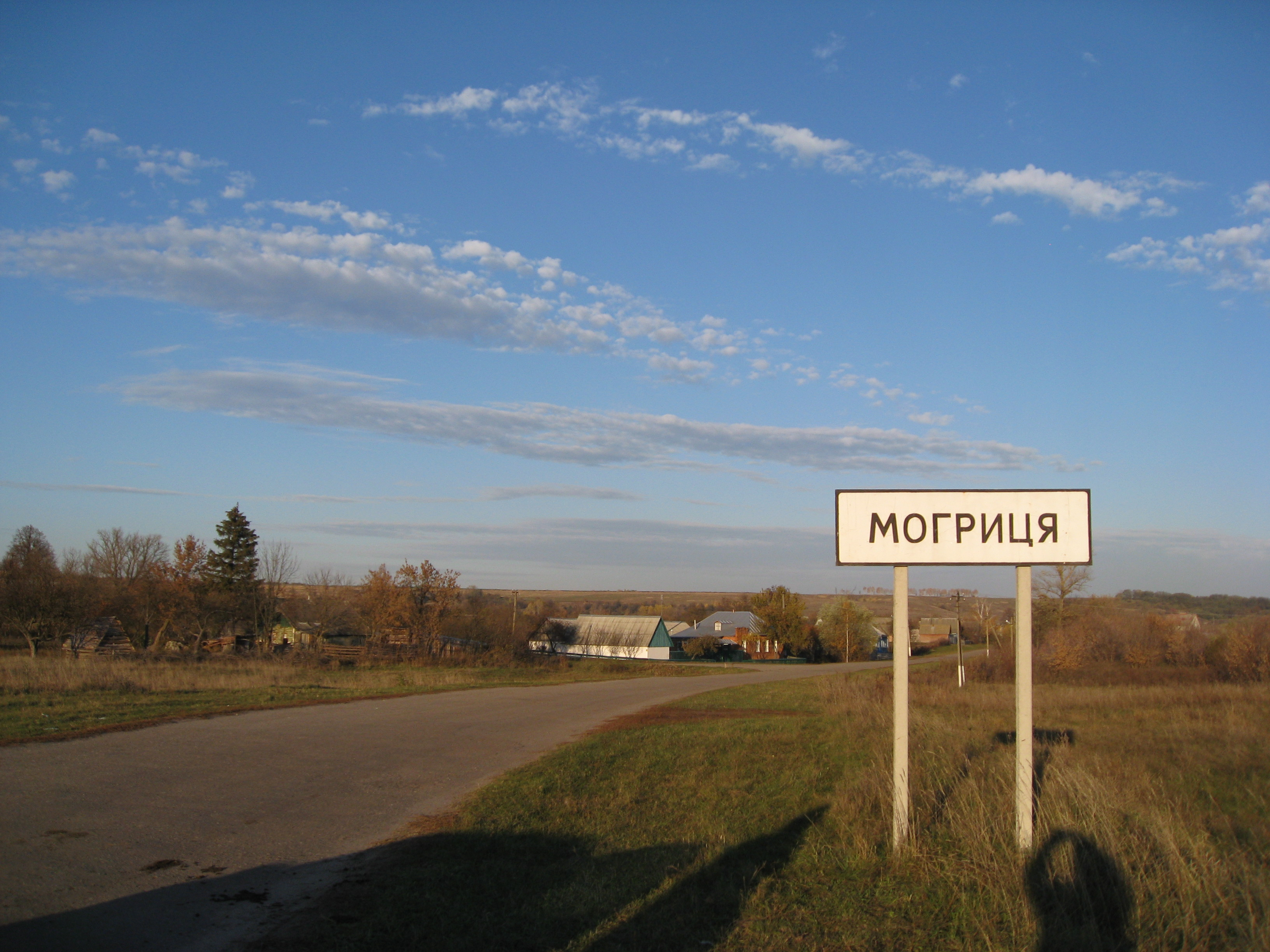
- The entrance to Mohrytsia
- Interactive map of Mohrytsia
- Location of Mohrytsya Mohrytsia (Ukraine)
- Coordinates: 51°2′10″N 35°6′2″E
- Country: Ukraine
- Oblast: Sumy Oblast
- Raion: Sumy Raion
- Hromada: Yunakivka rural hromada
- Founded: 1672
- Elevation: 152 m (499 ft)

Population (2001)
  - Total: 845
  - Estimate (2026): ▼24
- Time zone: UTC+2
  - Summer (DST): UTC+3
- Postal code: 42330
- Area code: +380 542

Mohrytsia (Ukrainian: Могриця) is a village in Yunakivka rural hromada, Sumy Raion, Sumy Oblast, Ukraine. Until 2020, the local government body was the Mohrytsia Village Council.

== Geography ==
The village of Mohrytsia lies on the right bank of the Psel River, upstream at a distance of 6 km is the village of Zapsillia, on the opposite bank is the village of Velyka Rybytsia.

A large forest (oak) adjoins the village.

== History ==
The village of Mohrytsia was founded in 1672. A settlement and settlement of Siverians (8th–10th centuries) were discovered near the village, as well as a kurgan cemetery.

On June 12, 2020, in accordance with the Resolution of the Cabinet of Ministers of Ukraine No. 723-r "On the Determination of Administrative Centers and Approval of Territories of Territorial Hromadas of Sumy Oblast", it became part of the Yunakivka rural hromada.

On July 19, 2020, as a result of the administrative-territorial reform and liquidation of the Sumy Raion (1923–2020), the community joined the newly formed Sumy Raion.

On February 23, 2023, by decision No. 4 of the Yunakivka Village Council "On renaming streets and alleys in settlements of the Yunakivka Rural Territorial Community", it was decided to rename the street in Mohrytsia without changing the numbering of buildings from Sudzhanska Street to Lisova Street, from Pershotravneva Street to Travneva Street and from Gagarina Street to Myru Street.

=== Russo-Ukrainian war ===
On May 4, 2022, between 6 and 7 a.m., Russian troops attacked the border in Sumy Oblast twice. According to the State Border Guard Service of Ukraine, the occupiers struck from aircraft at the area of the Yunakivka border guard department of the Sumy border detachment. According to the head of the Sumy OVA, Dmytro Zhyvytsky, between 6 and 7 a.m., there was artillery shelling from Grads along the border near Yunakivka. There were also several shots from a helicopter near the territory near Mohrytsia. According to the agency, there were no casualties or damage to infrastructure as a result of the shelling.

On January 30, 2024, Russian forces dropped explosives from a drone in the Yunakivka rural hromada of Sumy Oblast, killing a man as a result of the shelling, the OVA press service reported.

On July 14, 2024, the village was shelled by Russian troops. Two explosions were recorded, probably from a 120 mm mortar.

On August 1, 2024, the village was again shelled by Russian troops. 2 attacks were recorded: 3 explosions, probably an FPV drone.

On August 4, 2024, the settlement was subjected to another shelling by Russian troops. One explosion was recorded, probably a VOG discharge from a UAV.

On August 8, 2024, Russian forces hit the village with an airstrike on a village, four people died: a 23-year-old man, a 22-year-old man, a 6-year-old girl and a six-year-old boy. The head of the Sumy Oblast Military Administration Volodymyr Artiukh reported that brother and sister were in the yard of a school, which was completely destroyed as a result of a shelling.

On August 11, 2024, the village was once again shelled by Russian troops. According to the Operational Command North, 1 explosion was recorded, probably a KAB.

On August 17, 2024, the Operational Command North reported shelling of the Sumy Oblast. Among the affected settlements was the village of Mohrytsia – 1 explosion, probably a KAB. By 30 July 2026, the village was captured by Russian forces.

== Monuments ==
Not far from the village is the botanical reserve of national importance "Bannyi Yar". This is an old forest with steep ravines and gullies. Relict plants have been preserved in these forests – Lunaria and ostrich fern. The main tree species are oak, maple, hornbeam and linden.

Near Mohrytsia and Zapsillia there are chalk and lime quarries with kilns, where a significant number of paleontological finds have been discovered.

== Population ==
According to the 2001 Ukrainian census, the village's population was 845 people. The main native languages of the village were:

- Ukrainian 96.35%
- Russian 3.42%
- Armenian 0.24%

In 2023, the population of the village was 670 people. By 2025, the population of the village was 35 people.

== Notable people ==
The following were born in the village:

- Mykhailo Lykhovyd (1922–1944) – a Soviet military pilot, Hero of the Soviet Union, posthumously.
- Mykhailo Lushpa – a communist and economic activist in Konotop and Sumy.

== Gallery ==
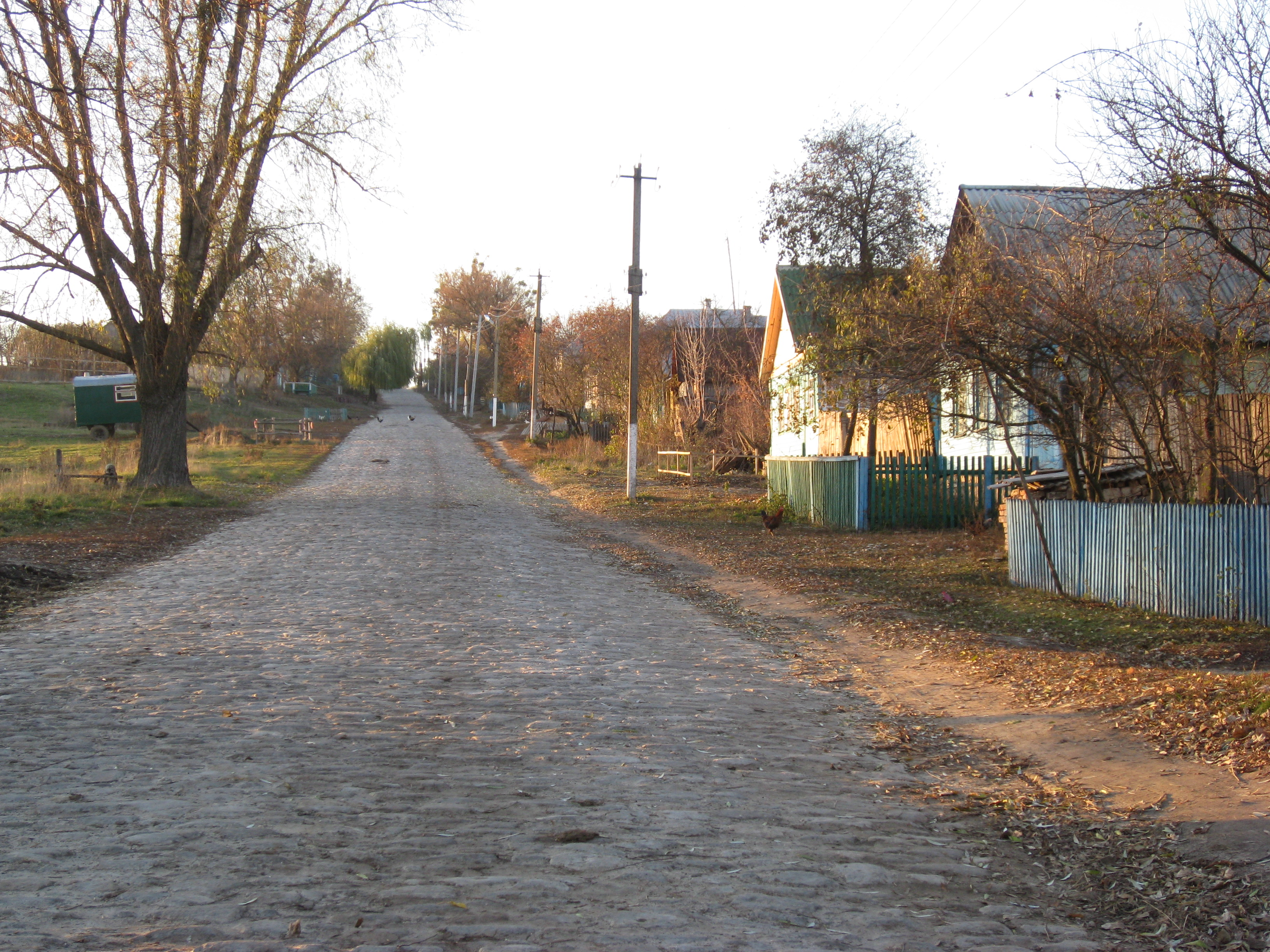
View of the main street (northern part of the village)

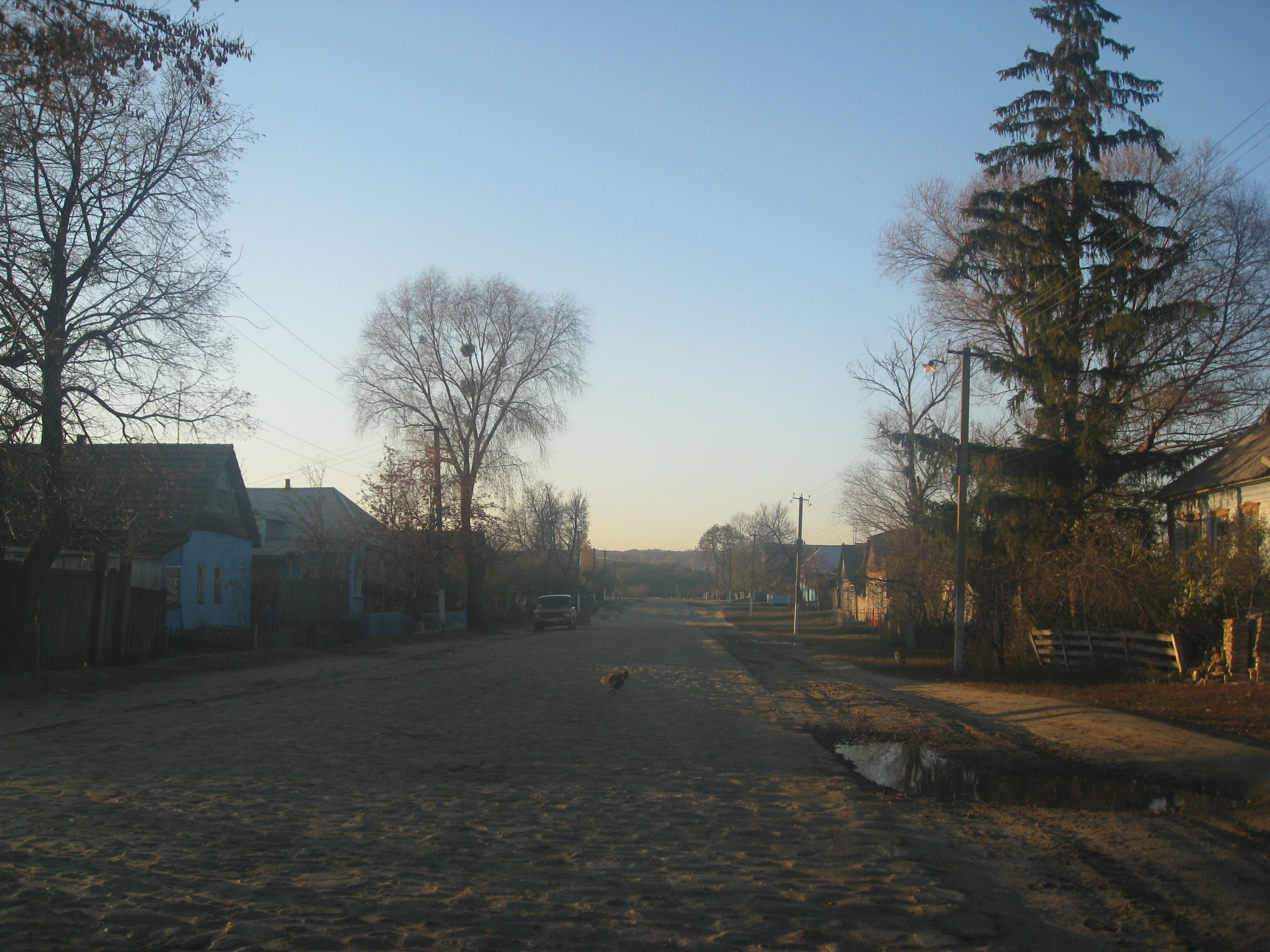
View of the main street (southern part of the village)
