= Sinne, Sumy Oblast =

Village in Sumy Oblast, Ukraine

Sinne Сінне
- Village
- Interactive map of Sinne
- Location of Sinne Sinne (Ukraine)
- Coordinates: 50°57′51″N 35°5′2″E
- Country: Ukraine
- Oblast: Sumy Oblast
- Raion: Sumy Raion
- Hromada: Myropillia rural hromada
- Elevation: 151 m (495 ft)

Population (2001)
  - Total: 466
- Time zone: UTC+2
  - Summer (DST): UTC+3
- Postal code: 42420
- Area code: +380 5459

Sinne is a rural settlement in Myropillia rural hromada, Sumy Raion, Sumy Oblast, Ukraine. Until 2020, the local government body was the Sinnivska Village Council.

== Geography ==
The village is located on the banks of the Sinna River, which flows into the Psel River after 7 km. The villages of Barylivka, Hrunivka and Hnylytsia are located 3 km away.

== History ==
The village suffered as a result of the Holodomor carried out by the Soviet Union in 1923–1933 and in 1946–1947.

On June 12, 2020, in accordance with the Resolution of the Cabinet of Ministers of Ukraine No. 723-r "On the Determination of Administrative Centers and Approval of Territories of Territorial Communities of Sumy Region", it became part of the Myropillia rural hromada.

On July 19, 2020, as a result of the administrative-territorial reform and liquidation of the Krasnopillia Raion, the village became part of the newly formed Sumy Raion.

=== Russo-Ukrainian War ===
On June 8, 2023, the Russian army struck the premises of the Sinnivka branch of the Myropil Lyceum with a "Shahed" drone.

On July 16, 2024, Russian troops shelled the village. Two explosions were recorded, probably from a Lancet UAV.

On August 11, 2024, the village was once again shelled. According to the Operational Command North, 2 shellings were recorded: 3 explosions, probably KAB.

On August 17, 2024, the Operational Command North reported shelling of Sumy Oblast. Among the affected settlements was the village of Sinne - 1 explosion, probably a rocket strike.

== Population ==
According to the 2001 Ukrainian census, the village's population was 466 people. The main languages of the village were:

- Ukrainian 96.79%
- Russian 2.99%
- Bulgarian 0.21%
- Other/not specified 0.01%

By 2025, the population of the villlage was completely evacuated.

== Notable people ==
The following were born in the village:

- Yuriy Oleksandrovych Andrienko (1993–2014) - A Ukrainian soldier who participated in the Russo-Ukrainian war.
