= Myropillia, Sumy Oblast =

Village in Sumy Oblast, Ukraine

Myropillia Миропілля
- Village
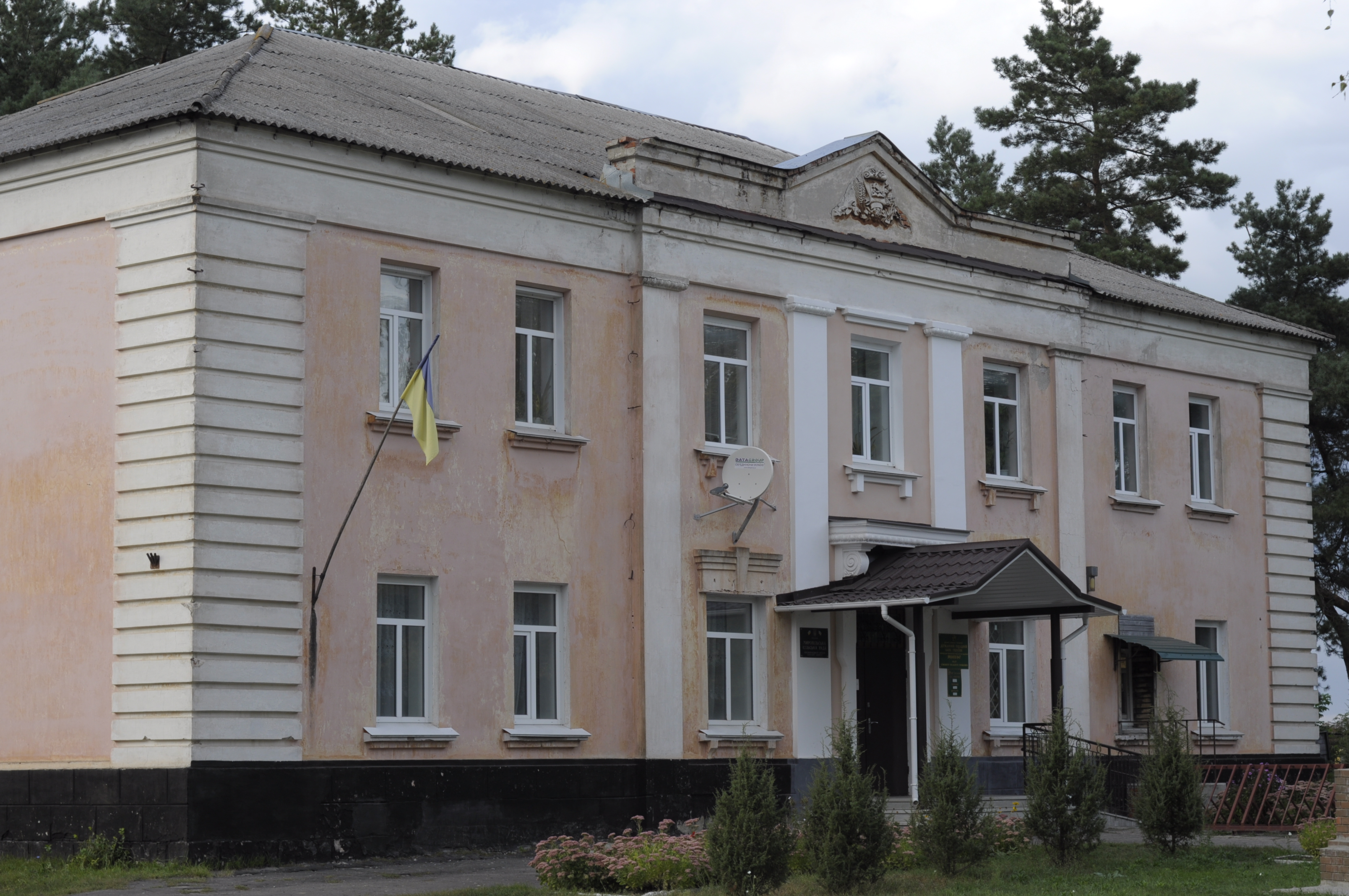
- Miropillia Village Council.

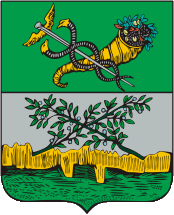
- Coat of arms
- Interactive map of Myropillia
- Location of Myropillia in Sumy Oblast Location of Myropillia in Ukraine
- Coordinates: 51°01′25″N 35°15′31″E
- Country: Ukraine
- Oblast: Sumy Oblast
- Raion: Sumy Raion
- Hromada: Myropillia rural hromada
- Established: c. 1650

Population (2001)
  - Total: 2,873
- Time zone: UTC+2 (EET)
  - Summer (DST): UTC+3 (EEST)
- Postal code 1: 42410
- Postal code 2: 42415
- KATOTTH: UA59080170010043659

Myropillia (Ukrainian: Миропілля, pronounced [mɪroˈpilʲːɐ]; Russian: Мирополье) is a village in Sumy Raion, Sumy Oblast, Ukraine. It is the administrative centre of Myropillia rural hromada, one of the hromadas of Ukraine. Its population is 30 (as of April 2025).

== Geography ==
The village of Myropillia is located on the left bank of the Psyol River, where it is joined by its tributary Udava River. Upstream, 1 km away, is the village of Oleksandriia, downstream, 3.5 km away, is the village of Velyka Rybytsia, and on the opposite bank is the village of Zapsillia. The Russian–Ukrainian border runs approximately 1 km from the village.

== History ==
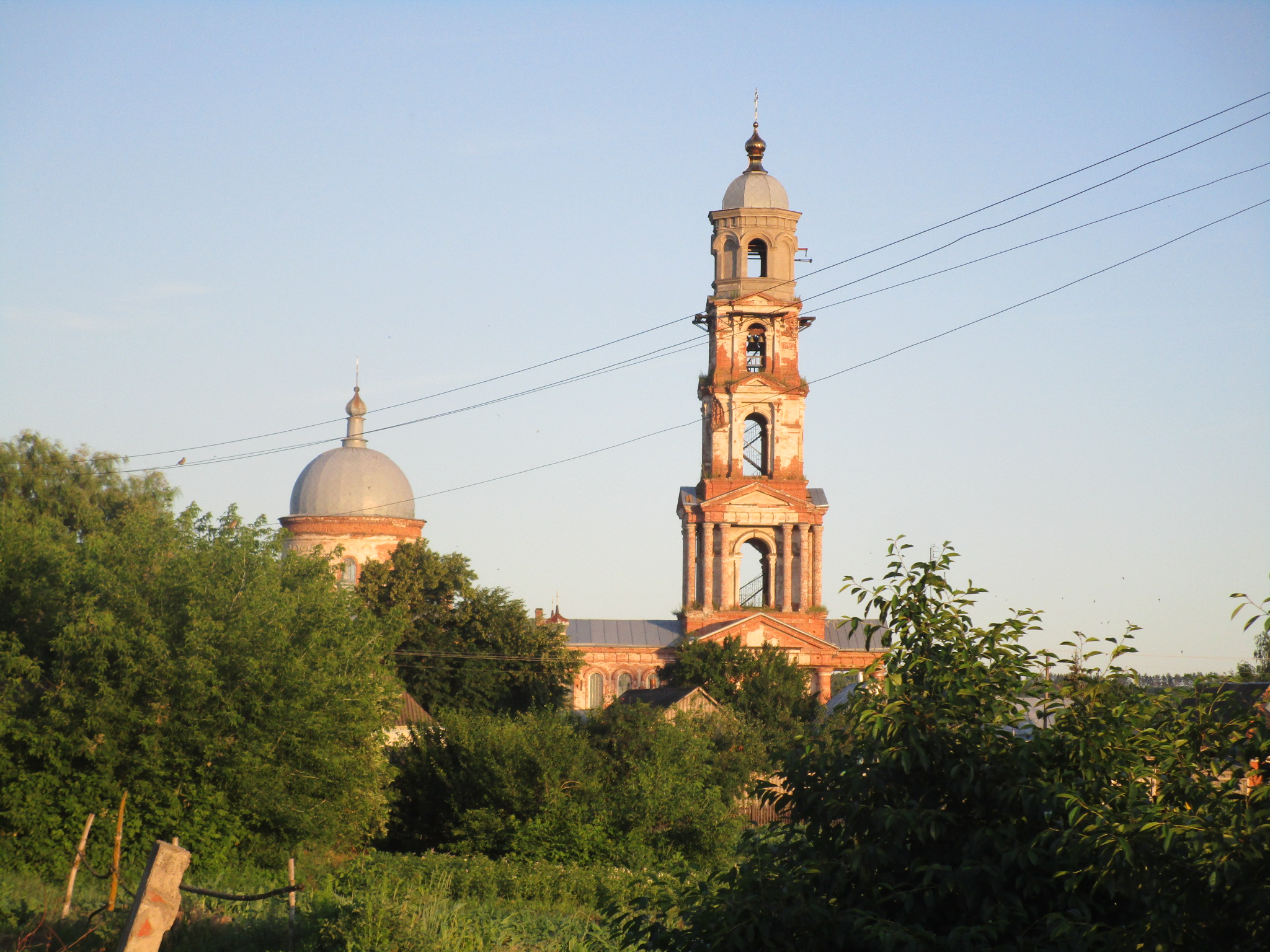
St. Nicholas Church in Miropillia.

Miropillia was founded around 1650 with the permission of Tsar Alexei Mikhailovich by settlers fleeing the punitive actions of the Polish-Lithuanian Commonwealth. It was one of the Slobozhanshchina Cossack settlements. It was populated by settlers from Podolia, some of whom came from Miropol (Zhytomyr Oblast) a town in Volhynia who gave the settlement its name. According to local legend, the settlement was named for a local river known as the Myrna Pilka, which dried up around the time of alleged 15th- and 16th-century settlement. Myropillia was granted the status of a city in 1670, and had its own sotnia within the Sumy Regiment of the Cossack Hetmanate. In 1678, Miropillia consisted of a small town, a fort, and a trading post. The perimeter of the town was 215 fathoms, and the fort was 291 fathoms. Large forests and swamps surrounded it, which to some extent protected the town from attacks.

In 1708, when Peter the Great divided the Russian state into provinces, the town of Miropolye was assigned to the Kiev Governorate, and in 1719, to the Belgorod Governorate. In 1727, the Belgorod Governorate was separated from the Kiev Governorate, and the city of Miropillia remained as part of it. Miropillia and the Miropilskiy District were subordinate to the Belgorod Governorate in civil matters (a Voivodeship Chancellery was established in the city), but militarily, the town continued to operate under the sotnia administration, subordinate to Sumy. In 1764, according to the decree of Catherine II the separate voivodeship office in Miropolye was abolished, the cities of Miropolye, Karpov and Sudzha were supposed to have one voivodeship office. In 1765, the Sloboda Ukraine Governorate was formed from the districts of Slobozhanshchina, but Miropolye was left as part of the Belgorod province. Nevertheless, the sotnia rule was preserved, and Miropolye remained militarily subordinate to the Sumy province. In 1779, the Belgorod Governorate was abolished, and Miropolye was transferred to the Sloboda Ukraine Governorate, which in 1780 was transformed into the Kharkov Viceroyalty.

In 1781, along with other cities in the Kharkiv Viceroyalty, a coat of arms was established for Miropolye: "At the top of the shield is the Kharkiv coat of arms. At the bottom is a portion of a field sown with rye and two olive branches placed crosswise in a silver field, signifying the name of this city." In 1796, as a result of the provincial reform of Paul I, the Slobodsko-Ukrainian province was restored, the Miropolye Uyezd was abolished, and Miropillia became part of the Sudzhansky Uyezd of the Kursk Governorate as a provincial town. In 1860, new coats of arms were designed for the district towns of Kursk province, but they were never officially adopted. Miropillia was the only provincial town for which a new coat of arms was also designed. According to the census of 1897, 10,101 people lived in Miropol, of which 9,927 (98.28%) indicated Ukrainian (in the census - “Little Russian”) language as their native language, Russian (“Great Russian”) - 170 (1.68 %), other languages - 4 (0.04%).

At the beginning of the 20th century, Miropolye had 8 churches, a life-size monument to Alexander II, a volost administration building, an almshouse, schools, shops, 26 windmills, and 44 forges. The residents were primarily engaged in farming, and shoemaking was well-developed—the town had zemstvo shoemakers' workshops, opened on the initiative of Prince Pavel Dolgorukov, chairman of the Sudzhan Zemstvo Council. The town's main street was called Kurskaya.

In the spring of 1918, Miropolye entered the zone of influence of the German Empire and the Ukrainian State. In the autumn of 1918, the 1st Dnieper Detachment of the RSFSR was stationed in the Miropillia area, waging a guerrilla war against German and Ukrainian troops in the neutral zone—a 10-kilometer strip between the Ukrainian State and Soviet Russia. By the end of 1918, the regiment became part of the 1st Ukrainian Insurgent Division, which was transferred to Ukrainian territory in December to fight against the forces of Hetman Pavel Skoropadsky, and then the Directorate of the Ukrainian People's Republic. From July to November 1919, Sudzhansky County was under the control of the Armed Forces of South Russia under the command of Anton Denikin. Soviet power in Miropolye was finally established in late November 1919.

By the resolution of the Presidium of the All-Russian Central Executive Committee of May 12, 1924, Sudzhansky Uyezd was abolished, and Miropolye became part of the newly formed Borisovsky District (Grayvoronsky Uyezd since 1925) of Kursk Governorate, Russian SFSR. On 16 October 1925, the Krenichanskaya Volost of Grayvoronsky Uyezd, including the town of Miropolye, were transferred to the Ukrainian SSR. From September 1927, it was the center of the Miropolye District in the Sumy District; from February 27, 1932, the district was in the Kharkiv Oblast; and from January 10, 1939, in the Sumy Oblast. As a result of collectivisation, the Holodomor, and World War II, there was a high death rate. During the Great Patriotic War, Miropolye was occupied by Nazi troops. In late February and early March 1943, the 232nd Rifle Division (2nd Formation) fought heavily for Miropolye, eventually liberating it. After the war, Miropolye became a village.

During the Russian invasion of Ukraine, Myropillia's location five kilometres from the Russia–Ukraine border has led to significant problems for the village. Village infrastructure has been repeatedly attacked by Russian forces, and, according to local activist Tetiana Nahulova, as much as 60% of the population has fled. On 2 May 2026, Russian forces claimed control over the village.

== Demographics ==
According to the 2001 Ukrainian census, Myropillia has a population of 2,873. 95.61% of respondents to the 2001 census in Myropillia stated that their native language was Ukrainian. Of the remainder, 4.07% stated that their native language was Russian, 0.17% said that their native language was Armenian, and 0.03% each answered that their native language was Belarusian, Moldovan (Romanian), or German. As of April 2025, the village had a population of 30.

| Language | Population | Share |
|---|---|---|
| Ukrainian | 2,747 | 95.61% |
| Russian | 117 | 4.06% |
| Other | 9 | 0.33% |
| Total | 2,873 | 100.00% |

== Social sphere ==
=== Education ===
- Kindergarten,
- School,
- Interschool Educational Complex.

=== Economics ===
- Dairy and Poultry Farms,
- Druzhba, Agricultural Firm, LLC,
- Lan, Agricultural Firm, LLC,
- Brick Factory.

== Culture ==
From 1996 to 2014 in June, an annual religious procession was held from the Gornalsky Nikol'skiy Belogorskiy Monastyr', Sudzhansky District, Kursk Oblast to the village of Miropillia.

== Notable people ==
- Anna Hidora, painter.
- Borys Lazariev, physicist.
- Kost Moshchenko, museologist, ethnographer, painter, architect, and historian.
- Hnat Mykhailychenko, member of the Central Rada.
- Vitalii Piddubnyi, soldier of the Ministry of Internal Affairs of Ukraine killed during the War in Donbas.
- Ivan Povkh, water turbine physicist.
- Ahapii Shamrai, literary historian.
- Anatolii Taran, poet and journalist.
- Ivan Yeremenko, educator.

== Gallery ==
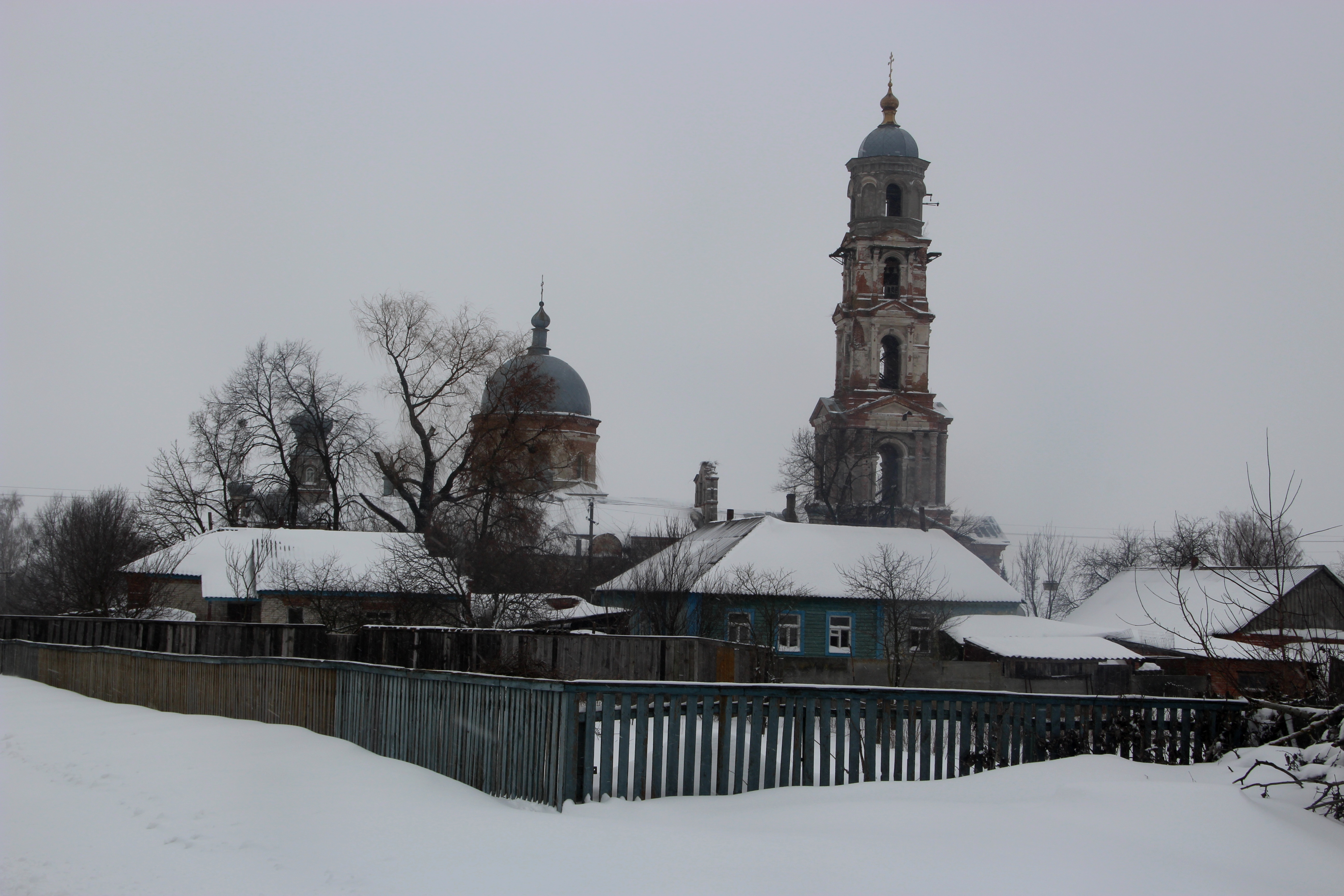
St. Nicholas Church

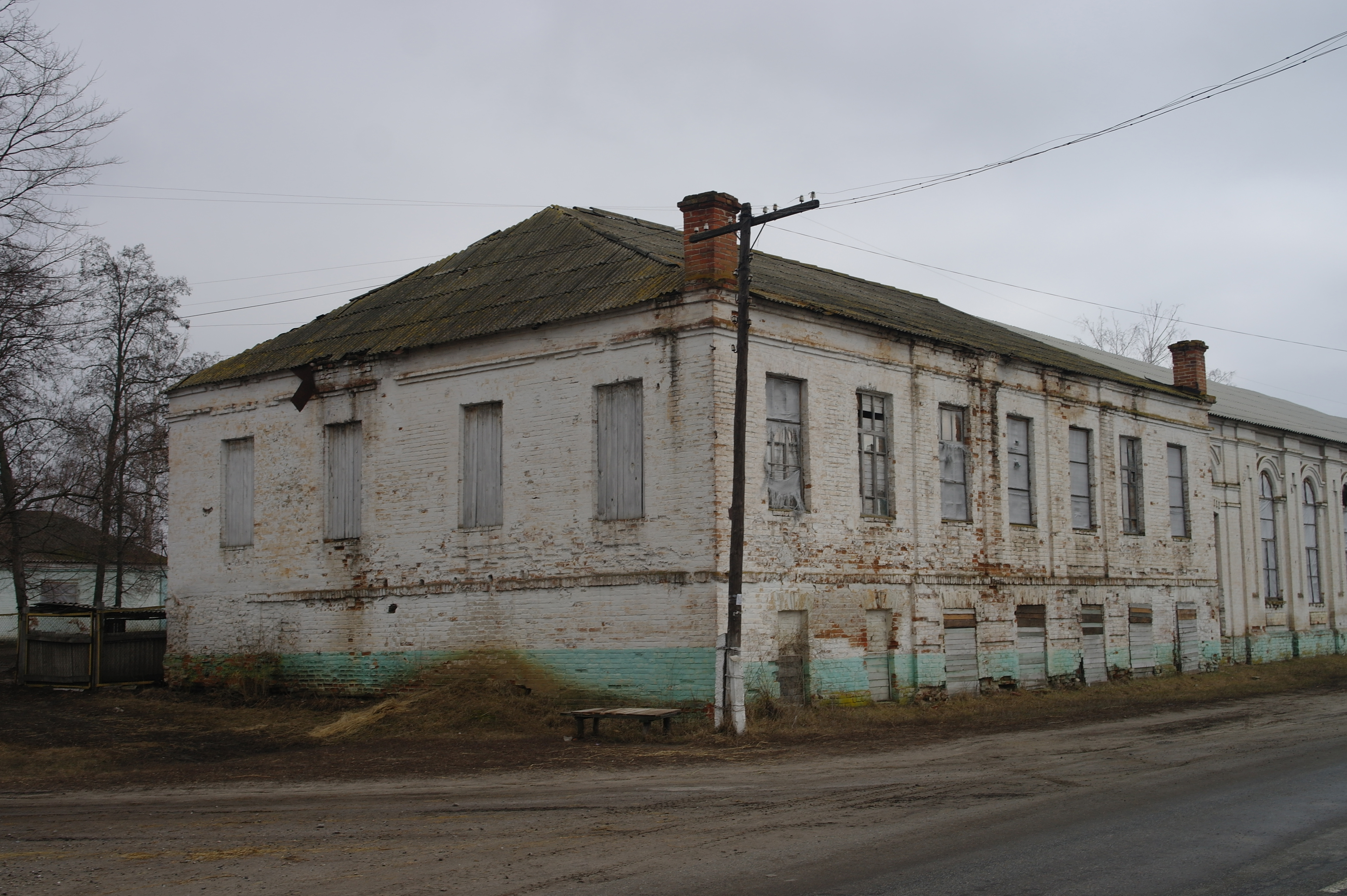
Former shoe factory

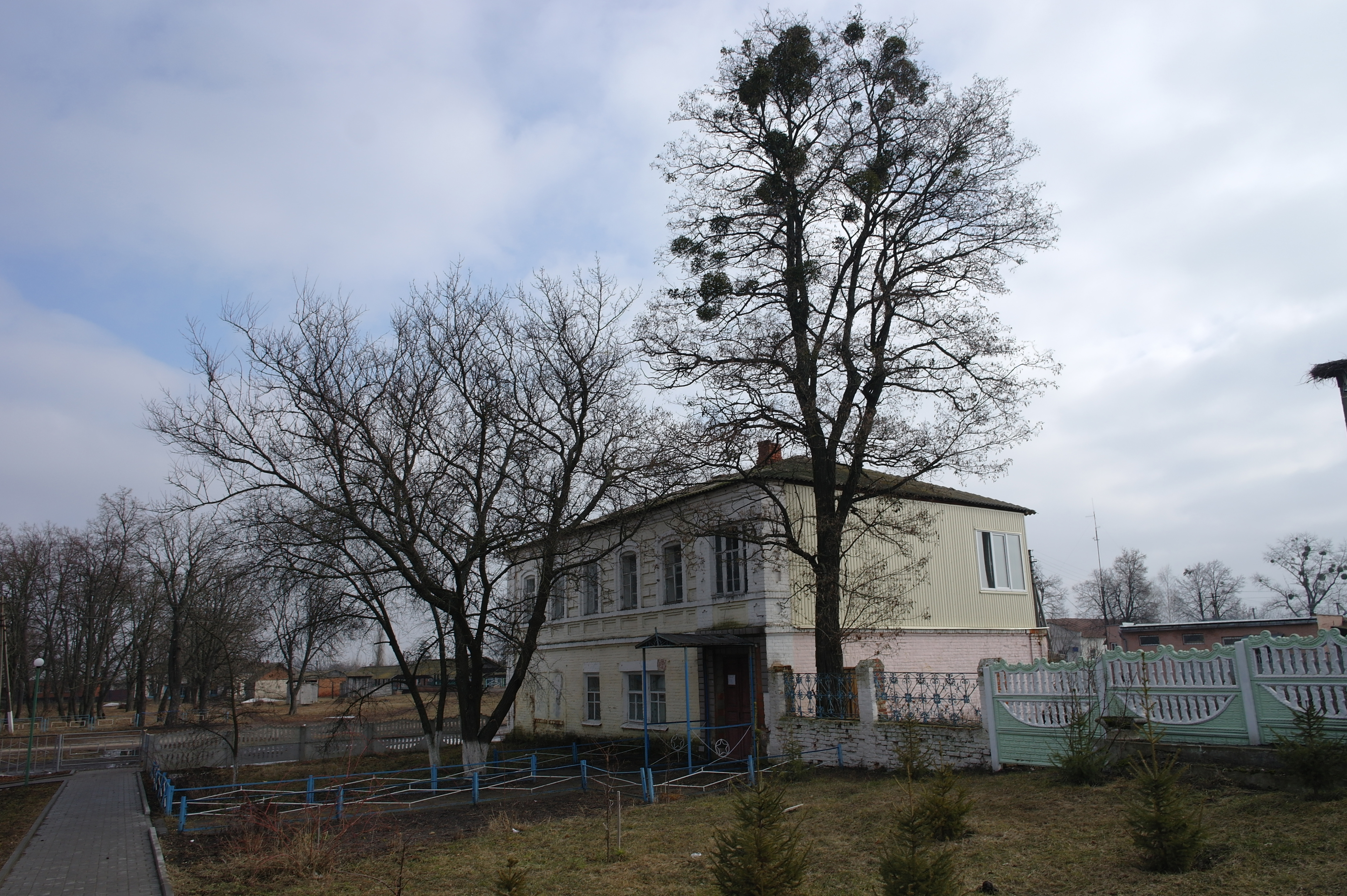
Shop

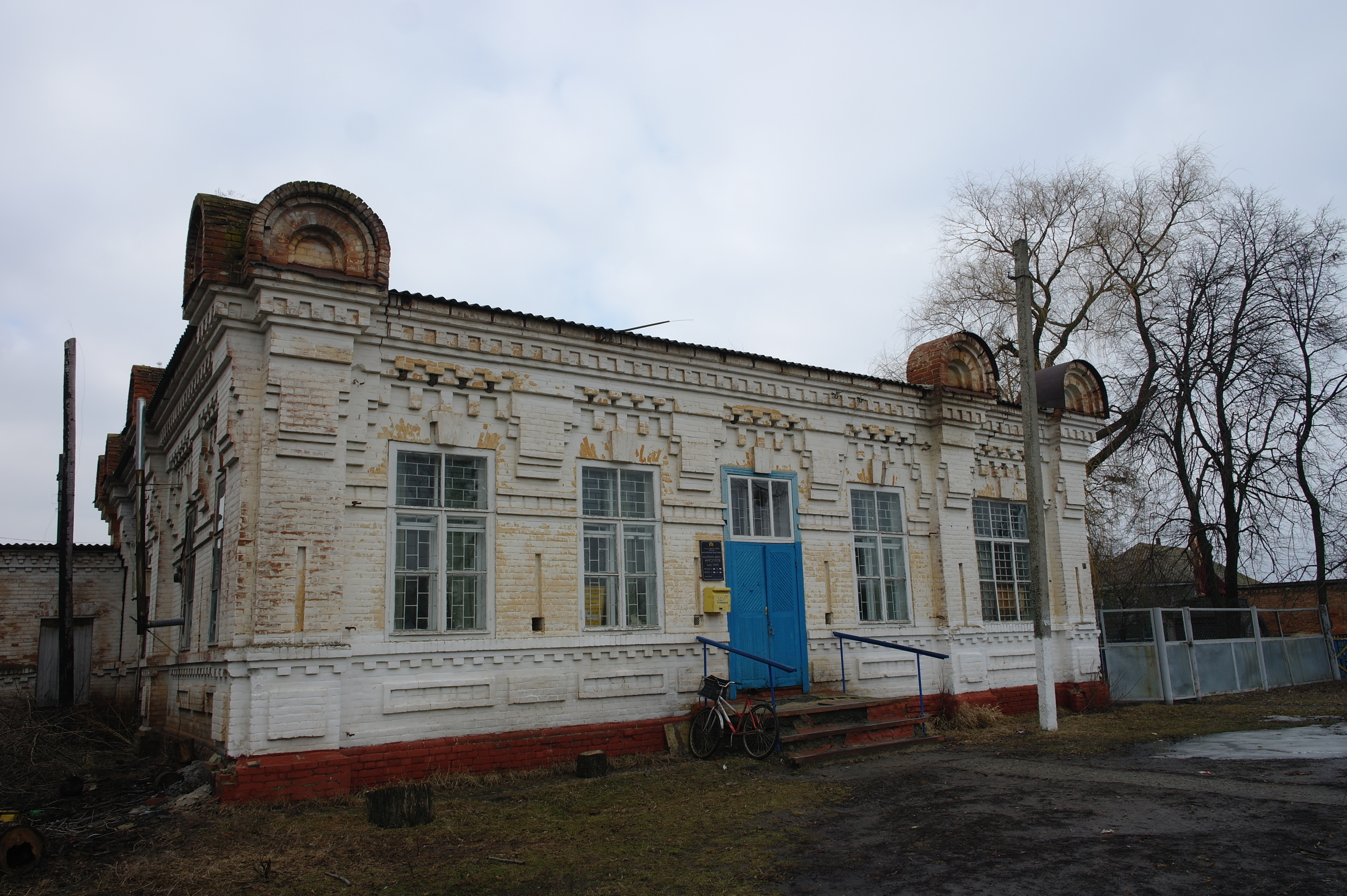
Post office

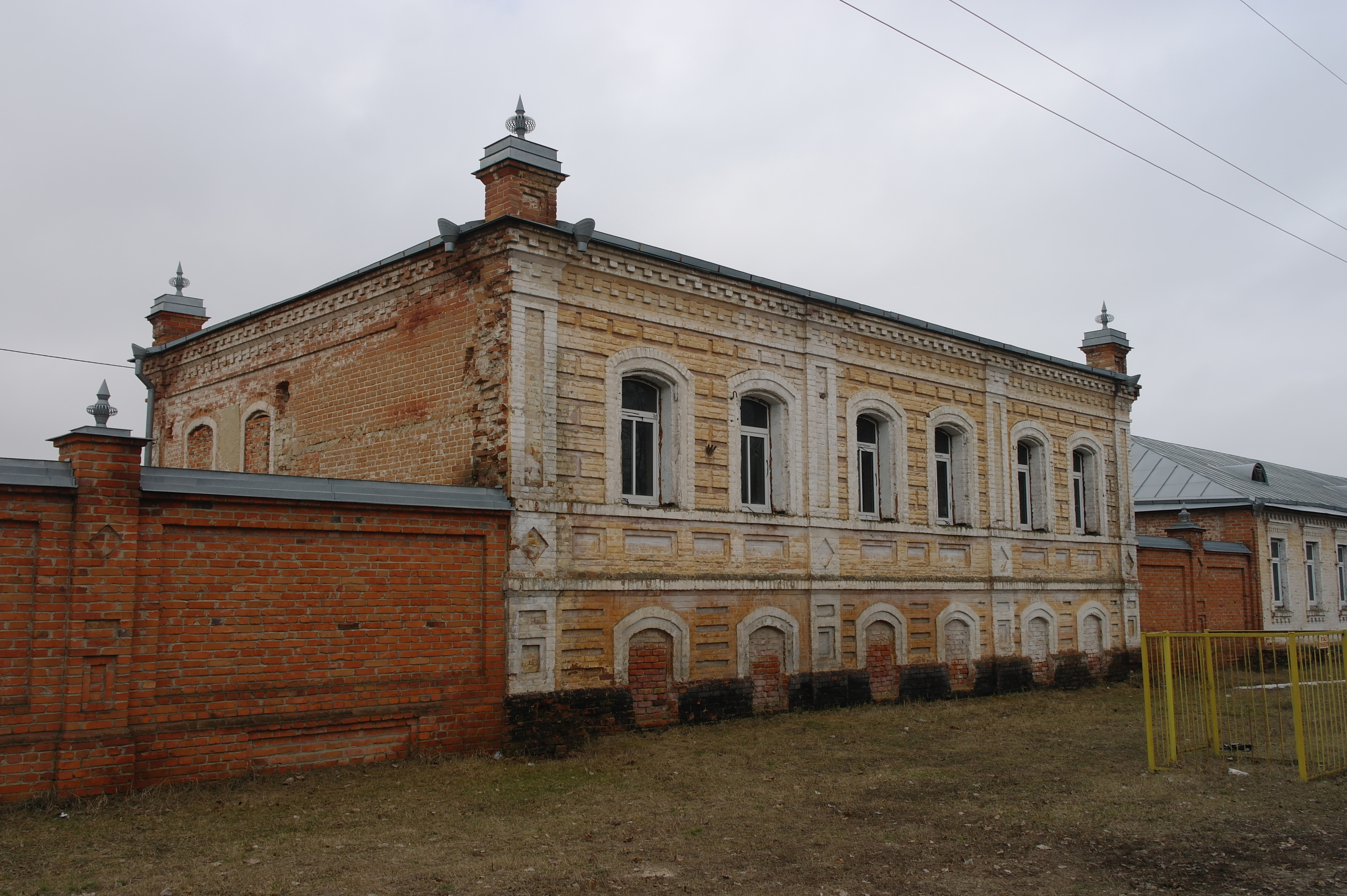
Sumska Street

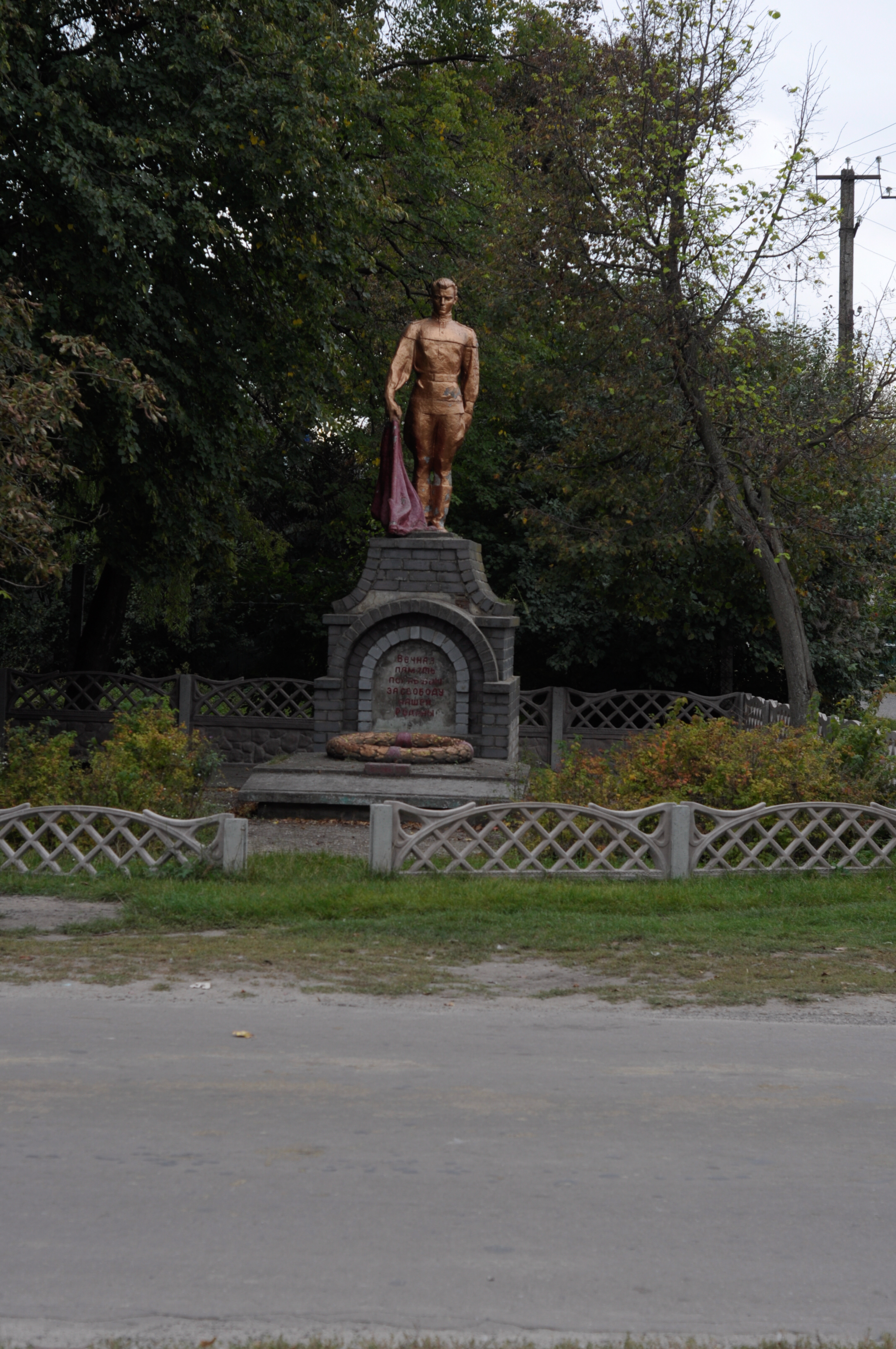
Monument to the fallen Red Army soldiers of the World War II
