= Oleksandriia, Sumy Oblast =

Village in Sumy Oblast, Ukraine

Oleksandriia Олександрія
- Village
- Interactive map of Oleksandriia
- Location of Oleksandriia Oleksandriia (Ukraine)
- Coordinates: 51°3′22″N 35°17′8″E
- Country: Ukraine
- Oblast: Sumy Oblast
- Raion: Sumy Raion
- Hromada: Myropillia rural hromada
- Elevation: 136 m (446 ft)

Population (2001)
  - Total: 9
- Time zone: UTC+2
  - Summer (DST): UTC+3

Oleksandriia is a village in Ukraine, in Myropillia rural hromada, Sumy Raion, Sumy Oblast. Until 2016, the local government body was Myropillia Village Council.

== Geography ==
The village of Oleksandriia is located on the border with Russia, 3 km from the right bank of the Psel River. The village of Myropillia is located 1 km away .

A drying stream with ravines flows through the village. Not far from the village is the Oleksandrivsky Hydrological Reserve.

== History ==
The village suffered as a result of the Holodomor carried out by the Soviet Union in 1923–1933 and in 1946–1947.

On June 12, 2020, in accordance with the Resolution of the Cabinet of Ministers of Ukraine No. 723-r "On the Determination of Administrative Centers and Approval of Territories of Territorial Communities of Sumy Region", it became part of the Myropillia rural hromada.

On July 19, 2020, as a result of the administrative-territorial reform and liquidation of the Krasnopillia Raion, the village became part of the newly formed Sumy Raion.

=== Russo-Ukrainian War ===
On May 30, 2025, Russian forces advanced near the village of Oleksandriia, which has resulted in DeepStateMap.Live designating Oleksandriia as a contested village that is part of the grey zone.

== Population ==
According to the 2001 Ukrainian census, the village's population was 9 people. The main languages of the village were:

- Ukrainian 88.89%
- Russian 11.11%
