= Velykyi Prykil =

Village in Sumy Oblast, Ukraine

Velykyi Prykil Великий Прикіл
- Village
- Interactive map of Velykyi Prykil
- Location of Velykyi Prykil Velykyi Prykil (Ukraine)
- Coordinates: 50°55′54″N 35°15′18″E
- Country: Ukraine
- Oblast: Sumy Oblast
- Raion: Sumy Raion
- Hromada: Myropillia rural hromada
- Elevation: 159 m (522 ft)

Population (2001)
  - Total: 191
- Time zone: UTC+2
  - Summer (DST): UTC+3
- Postal code: 42422
- Area code: +380 5459

Velykyi Prykil is a rural settlement in Myropillia rural hromada, Sumy Raion, Sumy Oblast, Ukraine. Until 2020, the local government body was the Malorybytsia Village Council.

== Geography ==
The village of Velykyi Prykil is located on the left bank of the Prykil River, upstream at a distance of 2.5 km is the village of Petrushivka, downstream 3 km is the village of Mala Rybytsia. The Yar Dyakonov River, a tributary of the Prykil River, also flows in the village.

== History ==
The village suffered as a result of the Holodomor carried out by the Soviet Union in 1923–1933 and in 1946–1947.

On June 12, 2020, in accordance with the Resolution of the Cabinet of Ministers of Ukraine No. 723-r "On the Determination of Administrative Centers and Approval of Territories of Territorial Communities of Sumy Region", it became part of the Myropillia rural hromada.

On July 19, 2020, as a result of the administrative-territorial reform and liquidation of the Krasnopillia Raion, the village became part of the newly formed Sumy Raion.

During the Russo-Ukrainian war, Russia claimed to have captured the village on August 30, 2026, which Ukrainian forces have denied.

== Population ==
According to the 2001 Ukrainian census, the village's population was 191 people. The main languages of the village were:

- Ukrainian 98.45%
- Russian 1.03%
- Belarusian 0.52%

By 2025, the population of the village was completely evacuated.

== Notable people ==
The following were born in the village:

- Yuriy Andrienko (1924–1986) - A innovator in agricultural production, head of the collective farm "Lenin's Path" ("Lenin's Testament") of the Krasnopillia Raion of Sumy Oblast. Deputy of the Supreme Soviet of the Ukrainian Soviet Socialist Republic of the 6th-7th convocations. Hero of Socialist Labour.
- Vasyl Volodymyrovych Bryukhovetsky - A specialist in the field of strength and plasticity physics. Doctor of Physical and Mathematical Sciences (2006).
