= Kamiane =

Kamiane (Ukrainian: Камяне) may stand for:

- Kamiane, Sumy Oblast, a village in Sumy Oblast of Ukraine
- Kamiane, Luhansk Oblast, an urban-type settlement in Luhansk Oblast of Ukraine
- Kamiane, Zaporizhzhia Oblast, an urban-type settlement in Zaporizhzhia Oblast of Ukraine
