= Budylka =

Village in Sumy Oblast, Ukraine

Budylka Будилка
- Village
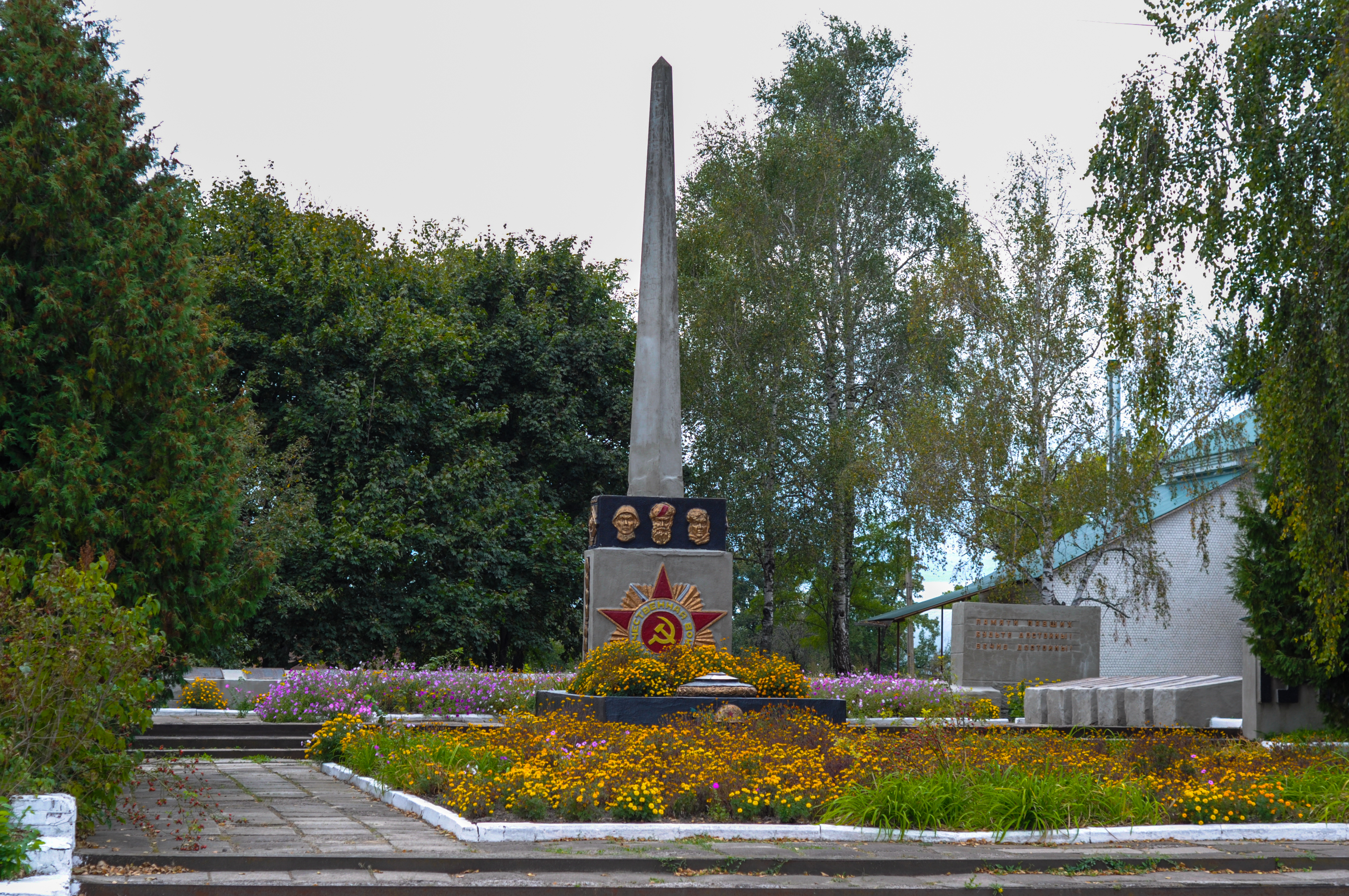

- Location of Budylka in Sumy Oblast Location of Budylka in Ukraine
- Coordinates: 50°29′50″N 34°25′51″E
- Country: Ukraine
- Oblast: Sumy Oblast
- Raion: Sumy Raion
- Hromada: Lebedyn urban hromada

Area
  - Total: 4 km^{2} (1.5 sq mi)

Population
  - Total: 2,049

Budylka is a village in Ukraine in the Sumy Raion of the Sumy Oblast. The population is 2049 people.

== Geography ==
The village of Budylka is located on the banks of the Budylka river, which after 5 km flows into the Psel river. 1.5 km upstream is the village of Kulichka, 3 km downstream is the village of Selyshche. Other nearby villages include Dremlyuhy and Borovenka. A large forest massif (pine) adjoins the village.

== Transport ==
The T 1906 highway passes through the village. A railway branch connects the village to Lebedyn.

== History ==
The village was founded in the 1730s at the center of the two Budylka sotnias of the Sumy Regiment.

According to data from 1864, in the state village of Lebedyn volost of Lebedyn poviat of Kharkiv gubernia, 1,328 people (654 men and 674 — women), resided there among 215 farm households.

As of 1885, 1,080 residents lived in 332 farm households, supported by an Orthodox church and a school.

As of 1914 the village belonged to Borovenka volost, while inhabitants increased to 2966.

On June 12, 2020, it became part of the Lebedyn urban hromada.

On July 19, 2020, after the liquidation of Lebedynskyi district, the village became part of Sumy Raion.

On February 21, 2025, the Russian army launched a missile strike on the village of Budylka, damaging 15 houses in the centre of village, injuring noone.

== Demographics ==
According to the 2001 Census of Ukraine, the village had 2036 people.

=== Languages ===
Distribution of the population by native language according to the 2001 census:

| Language | Percentage |
|---|---|
| Ukrainian | 94.44% |
| Russian | 5.03% |
| Belarusian | 0.15% |
| Armenian | 0.05% |
| other | 0.33% |

== Notables ==
- Ziuzia Serhyi Anatoliyovych (1971) — cardiovascular surgeon. Has a patent for a device for destroying blood vessels.
- Demydenko Oleksandr Stepanovych (1940) — poet-songwriter, author of lyrics for over 200 songs. Best known as the lyricist for the song "The Clouded Sky Is Crying". Member of the National Union of Writers of Ukraine (since 2009).
- Nazarenko Yevhen Danylovych (1938–2009) — Ukrainian local historian, historian, teacher.
- Nikonenko Leonid Maksymovych (1929–2016) — Ukrainian writer, playwright, theater actor.
- Strelchenko Nelya Naumivna (1941) — Ukrainian teacher.
- Shupyk Platon Lukych (1907–1986) — Minister of Health of the Ukrainian SSR.

== Sources ==
Історія міст та сіл України. Том Сумська область. стор. 388
