= Myropillia rural hromada =

Urban hromada of Sumy Oblast, Ukraine

Myropillia rural hromada Миропільська сільська громада
- Hromada
- Interactive map of Myropillia rural hromada
- Location within Sumy Oblast Location within Ukraine
- Coordinates: 51°01′25″N 35°15′31″E
- Country: Ukraine
- Oblast (province): Sumy Oblast
- Raion (district): Sumy Raion

Area
  - Total: 298.6 km^{2} (115.3 sq mi)

Population (2018)
  - Total: 4,525

Myropillia rural hromada is a territorial community in the Sumy Raion, in Sumy Oblast, in Ukraine. The administrative center is the village of Myropillia.

The area of the community is 298.6 km^{2}, and the population is 4,525 (2018). On March 13 2025, 543 inhabitants were evacuated from Myropillia rural hromada and Yunakivka rural hromada.

It was formed on August 25, 2016, by merging the Zapsillia Village Council, Mala Rybytsia Village Council, Myropillia Village Council and Sinnivska Village Council of the Krasnopillia Raion.

On July 19, 2020, as a result of the administrative-territorial reform and liquidation of the former Sumy Raion (1923–2020), the community joined the newly formed Sumy Raion.

== Composition ==
The hromada includes 10 villages:

- Barylivka
- Hnylytsia
- Hrunivka
- Mala Rybytsia
- Myropillia
- Oleksandriia
- Sinne
- Velyka Rybytsia
- Velykyi Prykil
- Zapsillia
