= Petrushivka, Sumy Oblast =

Village in Sumy Oblast, Ukraine

Petrushivka Петрушівка
- Village
- Interactive map of Petrushivka
- Location of Petrushivka Petrushivka (Ukraine)
- Coordinates: 50°54′11″N 35°17′19″E
- Country: Ukraine
- Oblast: Sumy Oblast
- Raion: Sumy Raion
- Hromada: Krasnopillia settlement hromada
- Elevation: 170 m (560 ft)

Population (2001)
  - Total: 170
- Time zone: UTC+2
  - Summer (DST): UTC+3
- Postal code: 42432
- Area code: +380 5459

Petrushivka is a rural settlement in Krasnopillia settlement hromada, Sumy Raion, Sumy Oblast, Ukraine. Until 2020, the local government body was the Uhroidy Village Council.

== Geography ==
The village of Petrushivka is located near the sources of the Prykil River, downstream at a distance of 2.5 km is the village of Velykyi Prykil.

There is a small dam on the river.

A small forest area adjoins the forest.

== History ==
The village suffered as a result of the Holodomor carried out by the Soviet Union in 1923–1933 and in 1946–1947.

On June 12, 2020, in accordance with the Resolution of the Cabinet of Ministers of Ukraine No. 723-r "On the Determination of Administrative Centers and Approval of Territories of Territorial Communities of Sumy Region", it became part of the Krasnopillia settlement hromada.

On July 19, 2020, as a result of the administrative-territorial reform and liquidation of the Krasnopillia Raion, the village became part of the newly formed Sumy Raion.

== Population ==
According to the 2001 Ukrainian census, the village's population was 170 people. The main languages of the village were:

- Ukrainian 94.74%
- Russian 4.68%
- Moldovan (Romanian) 0.58%

By 2025, the population of the villlage was completely evacuated.
