= Mala Rybytsia =

Village in Sumy Oblast, Ukraine

Mala Rybytsia Мала Рибиця
- Village
- Uspenskyi church in the village.
- Interactive map of Mala Rybytsia
- Location of Mala Rybytsia Mala Rybytsia (Ukraine)
- Coordinates: 50°57′6″N 35°12′46″E
- Country: Ukraine
- Oblast: Sumy Oblast
- Raion: Sumy Raion
- Hromada: Myropillia rural hromada
- Elevation: 139 m (456 ft)

Population (2001)
  - Total: 496
- Time zone: UTC+2
  - Summer (DST): UTC+3
- Postal code: 42422
- Area code: +380 5459

Mala Rybytsia is a rural settlement in Myropillia rural hromada, Sumy Raion, Sumy Oblast, Ukraine. Until 2020, the local government body was the Malorybytsia Village Council.

== Geography ==
The village is located in the north of the district, mainly on the right bank of the Rybytsia River at the confluence of the Prykil River. 1.5 km upstream is the village of Osoyivka, and 5 km downstream is Velyka Rybytsia.

The distance from Sumy is about 30 km (by road - 43 km [ 2 ] ), to Krasnopillia - 30 km [ 2 ], where the nearest railway station is located.

The altitude above sea level is 139 m.

== History ==
The village was founded in the 1780s. Since the 1680s, it has been the administrative center of the Rybnytska Hundred of the Sumy Regiment.

The village suffered as a result of the Holodomor carried out by the Soviet Union in 1923–1933 and in 1946–1947.

395 residents of Mala Rybytsia fought on the fronts of World War II, 127 of them were awarded orders and medals of the USSR for their courage and bravery in battle, 225 died. In 1963, an obelisk of Glory was erected in the village to honor the soldiers of the village who fell on the fronts of the war. A native of the village , ace pilot Stepan Ridny, was awarded the title of Hero of the Soviet Union.

In the post-war period, the village was home to the central estate of the collective farm "Kommunar", which had 3,719 hectares of agricultural land, including 2,620 hectares of arable land. These were multi-branch farms, where grain and industrial crops were grown, and meat and dairy cattle were raised.

On June 12, 2020, in accordance with the Resolution of the Cabinet of Ministers of Ukraine No. 723-r "On the Determination of Administrative Centers and Approval of Territories of Territorial Communities of Sumy Region", it became part of the Myropillia rural hromada.

On July 19, 2020, as a result of the administrative-territorial reform and liquidation of the Krasnopillia Raion, the village became part of the newly formed Sumy Raion. On 2 October 2026, Russian forces claimed captured the village.

== Infrastructure ==
The village has a comprehensive school of grades I-III, a club, a library, a medical center, shops and a communications center.

There is a dairy farm and an industrial clay deposit has been explored.

== Population ==
According to the 2001 Ukrainian census, the village's population was 496 people. The main languages of the village were:

- Ukrainian 95.14%
- Russian 4.86%

In 2025, the population of the villlage was 8 people.

== Notable people ==
The following were born in the village:

- Viktor Zhuk (1939–1980) - A participant in the Soviet–Afghan War, holder of the Order of the Red Banner (posthumously).
- Stepan Ridny - A Soviet military pilot, Hero of the Soviet Union.
- Mykhaylo Fomenko - A Ukrainian football player, head coach of the Ukraine national football team.
- Ivan Andrievsky - A Soviet veterinarian.
