= Zapsillia, Sumy Oblast =

Village in Sumy Oblast, Ukraine

Zapsillia Запсілля
- Village
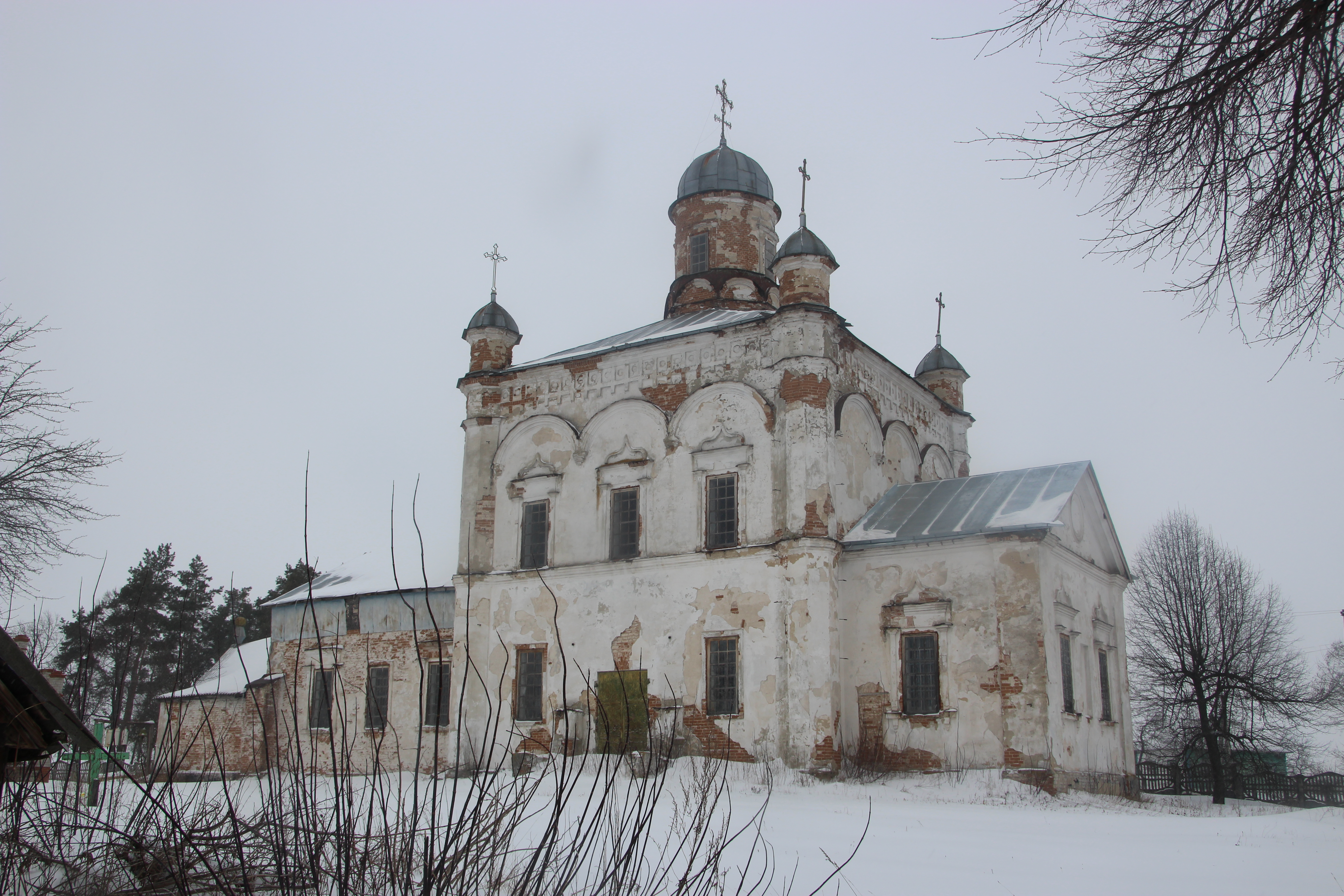
- Trinity Church, Zapsillia
- Interactive map of Zapsillia
- Location of Zapsillia Zapsillia (Ukraine)
- Coordinates: 51°1′27″N 35°12′52″E
- Country: Ukraine
- Oblast: Sumy Oblast
- Raion: Sumy Raion
- Hromada: Myropillia rural hromada
- Founded: 1680
- Elevation: 140 m (460 ft)

Population (2001)
  - Total: 654
  - Estimate (2025): 4
- Time zone: UTC+2
  - Summer (DST): UTC+3
- Postal code: 42417
- Area code: +380 5459

Zapsillia is a rural settlement in Myropillia rural hromada, Sumy Raion, Sumy Oblast, Ukraine. Until 2020, the local government body was the Zapsillia Village Council.

== Geography ==
The village of Zapsillia is located on the right bank of the Psel River, upstream at a distance of 2 km is the village of Gornal, downstream at a distance of 6 km is the village of Mohrytsya, on the opposite bank are the villages of Myropillia and Velyka Rybytsia.

The village is located 40 km north of the district center and railway station Krasnopillia.

== History ==
The village was founded in 1680. In 1671, Zapsillia was part of the city of Myropillia and had a Russian-style wooden church in honour of the Holy Trinity.

Near the village of Velyka Rybytsia, a settlement from Scythian times, a Slavic settlement and a settlement of northerners (8th–10th centuries) were discovered.

The village suffered as a result of the Holodomor carried out by the Soviet Union in 1923–1933 and in 1946–1947.

On June 12, 2020, in accordance with the Resolution of the Cabinet of Ministers of Ukraine No. 723-r "On the Determination of Administrative Centers and Approval of Territories of Territorial Communities of Sumy Region", it became part of the Krasnopillia settlement hromada.

On July 19, 2020, as a result of the administrative-territorial reform and liquidation of the Krasnopillia Raion, the village became part of the newly formed Sumy Raion.

=== Russo-Ukrainian War ===
On July 14, 2024, the village was shelled by Russian forces. 2 explosions were recorded, probably 122 mm artillery. As a result of the shelling, a private residential building was damaged. On August 10, 2024, the village was again subjected to Russian attacks. According to the Operational Command North, 3 explosions were recorded, probably KAB.

On August 17, 2024, the Operational Command North reported shelling of Sumy Oblast. Among the affected settlements was the village of Zapsillia - 1 explosion, probably a KAB. Russian forces first entered the village on 9 June 2026. As of July 2026, the village is under control of Russian forces.

== Population ==
According to the 2001 Ukrainian census, the village's population was 654 people. The main languages of the village were:

- Ukrainian 93.46%
- Russian 6.24%
- Armenian 0.15%
- Belarusian 0.15%

== Notable people ==
The following were born in the village:

- Krut Oleksandr Anatoliyovych - A Ukrainian scientist, Doctor of Sciences, Specialist in the field of coal technologies.
- Yevhen Anatolyevich Bilokovalenko - A Ukrainian soldier, a participant in the Russo-Ukrainian war.
- Petro Miroshnychenko - Participant in World War II, commander of the infantry reconnaissance platoon of the 717th Rifle Regiment of the 170th Rifle Division of the 48th Army of the 1st Belorussian Front, lieutenant, Hero of the Soviet Union.
