= Psel (river) =

River in Ukraine

Psel Psyol
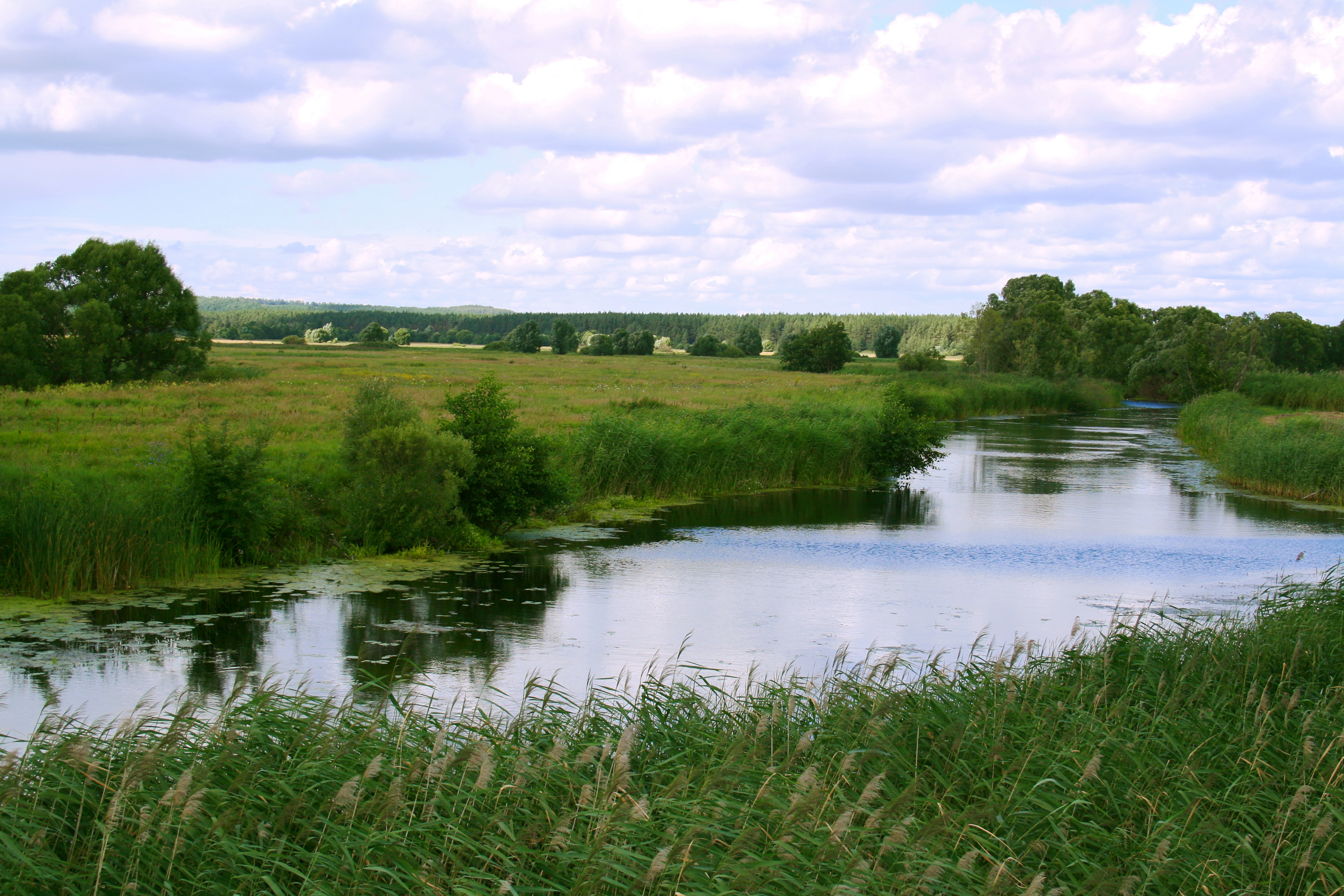
- The Psel near Ivnya

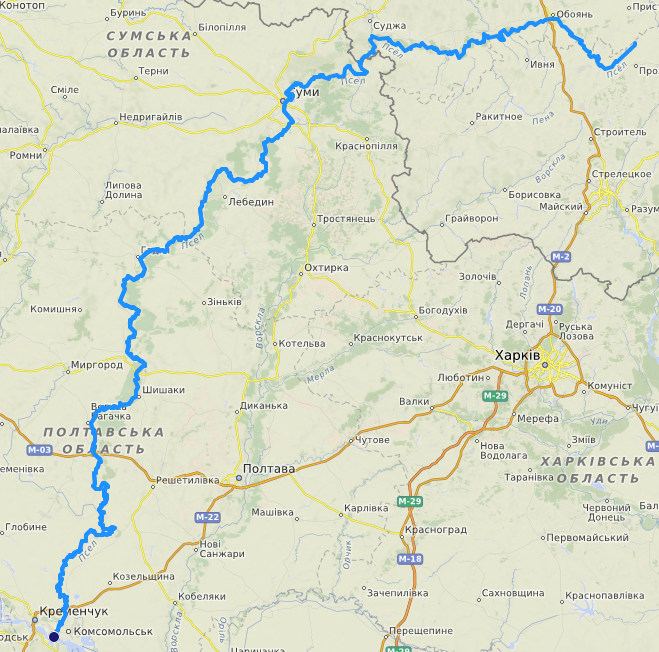
- Psel River
- Native name: Псел (Ukrainian)

Location
- Country: Russia, Ukraine
- Oblast: Russia Kursk Oblast Belgorod Oblast Ukraine Sumy Oblast Poltava Oblast

Physical characteristics
- Source
  - location: Upstream of Prigorki, Prokhorovsky District, Belgorod Oblast, Russia
  - coordinates: 51°07′58″N 36°44′52″E
  - elevation: 247 m (810 ft)
- Mouth: Dnieper
  - location: Downstream of Kremenchuk, Poltava Oblast, Ukraine
  - coordinates: 49°01′16″N 33°32′03″E
- Length: 717 km (446 mi)
- Basin size: 22,800 km^{2} (8,800 sq mi)

Basin features
- Progression: Dnieper→ Dnieper–Bug estuary→ Black Sea
- Tributaries
  - left: Pena, Hrun-Tashan, Hovtva
  - right: Sudzha, Hrun, Khorol

The Psel or Psyol (Ukrainian: Псел; Russian: Псёл) (Note: Also spelled as Ukrainian: Псьол, Псло, romanized: Psiol, Pslo) is a river, a left tributary of the Dnieper, which flows through Russia and Ukraine.

The Psel has a length of 717 kilometres (446 mi) and a drainage basin of 22,800 square kilometres (8,800 sq mi). The river's right bank is high and steep, unlike the low, left bank. Its periods of freezing range from December until the end of February to the beginning of April.

== Tributaries ==
The following rivers are tributaries to the river Psel (from source to mouth):

Left: Ilyok, Pena, Udava, Rybytsia, Sinna, Syrovatka, Ustya, Lehan, Vilshanka, Budylka, Bobrava, Borovenka, Vepryk, Bobryk, Tukh, Glinitsa, Bakai, Lyutenka, Hrun-Tashan, Hovtva, Rudka

Right: Sudzha, Porozok, Oleshnia, Sumka, Vorozhba, Mezhyrichka, Hrun, Rashevka, Vuzka, Vovnianka, Balakliyka, Khorol, Manzheliya, Omelnyk, Belichka, Bahachka, Sukhyi Kahamlyk

== Settlements ==
Cities and towns located on the river are: Sumy, Ukraine, the administrative center of Sumy Oblast; Oboyan, Kursk Oblast, Russia; and Hadiach, Poltava Oblast, Ukraine.

=== Russia ===
- Belgorod Oblast
  - Prokhorovsky District
    - Prigorki, Verkhnyaya Olshanka, Srednyaya Olshanka, Bugrovka, Beregovoye Vtoroye, Prelestnoye, Andreyevka, Vasilyevka, Yudinka, Kostroma, Vesyoly
  - Ivnyansky District
    - Olkhovatka, Cherenovo, Peschanoye, Samarino
- Kursk Oblast
  - Oboyansky District
    - Peresyp, Semyonovka, Shipy, Znobilovka Kamynino, Goryaynovo, Afanasyevo, Oboyan, Trubezh, Anakhino, Lunino, Turovka, Gremyachka, Kartamyshevo, Shmyrevo
  - Belovsky District
    - Kurochino, Kursk Oblast, Gochevo, Strigosly, Bobrava, Loshakovka, Korochka, Peschanoye, Sukhodol, Giryi, Belitsa, Kursk
  - Sudzhansky District
    - Spalnoye, Borki, Fanseyevka, Kurilovka, Guyevo, Gornal

=== Ukraine ===
- Sumy Oblast
  - Zapsillya, Myropyllia, Velyka Rybytsia, Hrunivka, Bytytsya, Pushkarivka, Velyka Chernechchyna, Zelenyi Hai, Homyne, Sumy, Barvinkove, Stare Selo, Patriotivka, Kerdylivshchyna, Staronove, Byshkin, Tokari, Kulyky, Kurgan, Chervlene, Prystailove, Bobrove, Kamyane
- Poltava Oblast
  - Myrhorod Raion
    - Plishyvets, Duchyntsi, Brovarki, Hadiach, Velbyvka, Mali Budyshcha, Sosnivka, Rashivka, Lysivka, Mlyny, Pereviz, Mala Obukhivka, Velyka Obukhivka, Panasivka, Savyntsi, Velyki Sorochintsy, Malyi Pereviz, Pokrovske, Baranivka, Velykyi Pereviz, Shyshaky, Yaresky, Nyzhni Yaresky, Psilske, Velyka Bahachka, Harnokut, Luhove, Dzyubivshchyna, Krasnohorivka, Herusivka, Balakliya, Kolosivka,
  - Poltava Raion
    - Ostapye, Zapsillya, Pidhirya, Suhorabivka
  - Kremenchuk Raion
    - Popivka, Zamozhne, Manzheliya, Lamane, Plavni, Prylipka, Kyselivka, Hovtva, Zahrebellya, Yurky, Nyzhnya Manuilivka, Pisky, Knyshivka, Hunky, Zapsyllya, Omelnyk, Fedorenky, Kramarenky, Romanky, Onyshenky, Shcherbaky, Potoky, Pridnipryanske, Kuzmenky, Kyyashky, Dmytrivka

== Flora and fauna ==
The fauna on the riversides of the Psel includes hares, foxes, deer, wild boar, and beavers. There are a great variety of birds, such as wild duck and gray heron. Along the riversides there are forest areas, predominantly consisting of deciduous trees. There are also conifers on the sandy areas of the bank. There are also numerous meadows.

In the river there are about 50 species of fish such as crucian, bream, tench, roach, and others. There are also catfish, pike, and perch.
