= Mykhaylo Fomenko =

Ukrainian footballer (1948–2024)

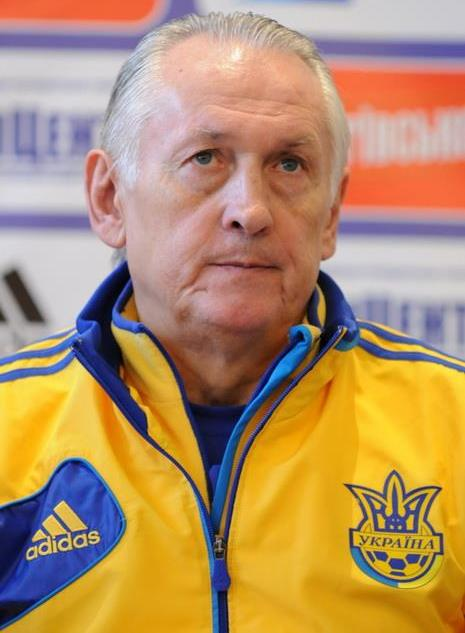
- Fomenko in 2013

Personal information
- Full name: Mykhaylo Ivanovych Fomenko
- Date of birth: 19 September 1948
- Place of birth: Mala Rybytsia, Sumy Oblast, Ukrainian SSR, USSR
- Date of death: 29 April 2024 (aged 75)
- Place of death: Sumy
- Height: 1.80 m (5 ft 11 in)
- Position: Defender

Youth career
- 1962–1965: Spartak Sumy

Senior career*
| Years | Team | Apps | (Gls) |
| 1965–1970 | Spartak Sumy | 48 | (8) |
| 1970–1972 | Zorya Luhansk | 59 | (1) |
| 1972–1979 | Dynamo Kyiv | 173 | (0) |
| Total | | 280 | (9) |

International career
| 1972–1976 | USSR | 24 | (0) |

Managerial career
- 1979: Frunzenets Sumy
- 1980–1985: Dynamo Kyiv (as instructor)
- 1985–1986: Desna Chernihiv
- 1987: Kryvbas Kryvyi Rih
- 1987–1990: Guria Lanchkhuti
- 1990–1991: Al-Rasheed and Iraq
- 1991–1992: Avtomobilist Sumy
- 1993: Dynamo Kyiv
- 1994: Veres Rivne
- 1994: Guinea
- 1994–1996: CSKA-Borysfen Kyiv
- 1996–2000: Metalist Kharkiv
- 2000–2001: CSKA Kyiv
- 2001–2002: Metalist Kharkiv
- 2003: Metalurh Zaporizhia
- 2003–2005: Metalist Kharkiv
- 2005: Spartak Sumy (vice-president)
- 2005–2008: Tavriya Simferopol
- 2010–2011: Salyut Belgorod
- 2012–2016: Ukraine
Medal record
Men's football
Representing Soviet Union
| Bronze medal – third place | 1976 Montreal | Team competition |
UEFA European Championship
| Silver medal – second place | 1972 Belgium |
- * Club domestic league appearances and goals

Mykhaylo Ivanovych Fomenko (Ukrainian: Михайло Іванович Фоменко; 19 September 1948 – 29 April 2024) was a Ukrainian football player and coach.

As a player, he was capped 24 times for the Soviet Union, and, as a head coach, became the second ever manager – after Oleh Blokhin – to take the Ukraine national team to an international finals tournament, reaching UEFA Euro 2016.

Fomenko was famous for his coaching in Dynamo Kyiv, winning its first Ukrainian gold medals for the club, first Ukrainian Cup for the club and most notably, defeating Barcelona in the first leg of the Champions League tournament. Barcelona, under Johan Cruyff and with such star players as Ronald Koeman and Pep Guardiola, ended up to be finalist of that UEFA Champions League season.

Fomenko died in Sumy on 29 April 2024, at the age of 75.

== Playing career ==
Fomenko was an integral part of Dynamo Kyiv's achievements in the 1970s at the club level, which included hoisting the 1975 Winners Cup and Super Cup.

== Coaching career ==
After graduating from the Higher School of Coaches in Moscow in 1979, Fomenko coached numerous Ukrainian clubs, most notably Dynamo Kyiv. With Fomenko the club won its first Ukrainian gold medals, and its first Ukrainian Cup, both in 1993 and most notably, beating Barcelona in the first leg of the Champions League tournament. Barcelona ended up being finalist of that 39th season of the UEFA Champions League. Before that success, in the end of 1989, he promoted the Georgian club Guria Lanchkhuti to the Soviet Top league and in 2001 reached the Ukrainian Cup final with CSKA Kyiv, which was the best result in the club's history.

On 26 December 2012, Fomenko was given a one-year contract – with a possible second-year extension – as head coach of the Ukraine national team after the Football Federation of Ukraine had failed to retain Harry Redknapp and Sven-Göran Eriksson for the role. Fomenko coached Ukraine to six 2014 FIFA World Cup qualification wins, coming against Poland (twice), Moldova, Montenegro, San Marino and France, as well as one draw against England.

After placing second in their qualifying group, Ukraine was matched against France in the second round of UEFA qualifiers. Despite winning the first leg 2–0 at home, Ukraine fell 3–0 away to lose 3–2 on aggregate, thus failing to make the 2014 World Cup finals. Despite this, Fomenko indicated he would like to continue in his role and lead Ukraine in its UEFA Euro 2016 qualifying campaign, and on 6 February 2014, the Football Federation of Ukraine announced it had extended his contract until the end of 2015.

Fomenko ultimately led Ukraine to successful qualification in the Euro 2016 finals in France after finishing in third place in its qualifying group, setting up a playoff matchup against Slovenia. Here, Ukraine won 3–1 on aggregate to ensure the nation's spot in France. Fomenko subsequently extended his contract to coach Ukraine up to Euro 2016 until 30 July 2016, though he was promised another extension should Ukraine perform well at Euro 2016. Ukraine, however, had a disastrous tournament, losing all three group stage matches, including a defeat against the then world champions Germany (2–0) and, most shockingly, a loss to Northern Ireland (2–0), which sent Ukraine to an early exit.

== Managerial statistics ==
As of 21 June 2016

| Team | From | To | Record | | | | |
| Team | From | To | G | W | D | L | Win % |
|---|---|---|---|---|---|---|---|
| Ukraine | December 2012 | June 2016 | 37 | 24 | 6 | 7 | 64.86 |
| Total | | | 37 | 24 | 6 | 7 | 64.86 |

== Honours ==
=== Player ===
Dynamo Kyiv

- Soviet Top League: 1974, 1975, 1977
- Soviet Cup: 1974, 1978
- UEFA Cup Winners' Cup: 1975
- UEFA Super Cup: 1975

Soviet Union

- Olympic Games bronze: 1976

Individual

- Merited Master of Sport of the USSR

=== Manager ===
Dynamo Kyiv

- Ukrainian Top League: 1993
- Ukrainian Cup: 1993; runner-up: 2001
