= Prelestnoye =

Prelestnoye Прелестное
- Selo
- Location within Belgorod Oblast Location within Russia
- Coordinates: 51°01′N 36°36′E
- Country: Russia
- Region: Belgorod Oblast
- District: Prokhorovsky District
- Time zone: UTC+3:00

Prelestnoye (Russian: Прелестное) is a rural locality (a selo) and the administrative center of Prelestnenskoye Rural Settlement, Prokhorovsky District, Belgorod Oblast, Russia. The population was 892 as of 2010. There are 5 streets.

== Geography ==
Prelestnoye is located 11 km west of Prokhorovka (the district's administrative centre) by road. Mikhaylovka is the nearest rural locality.
