= Kamiane, Sumy Oblast =

Village in Sumy Oblast, Ukraine

Kamiane Камяне
- Village
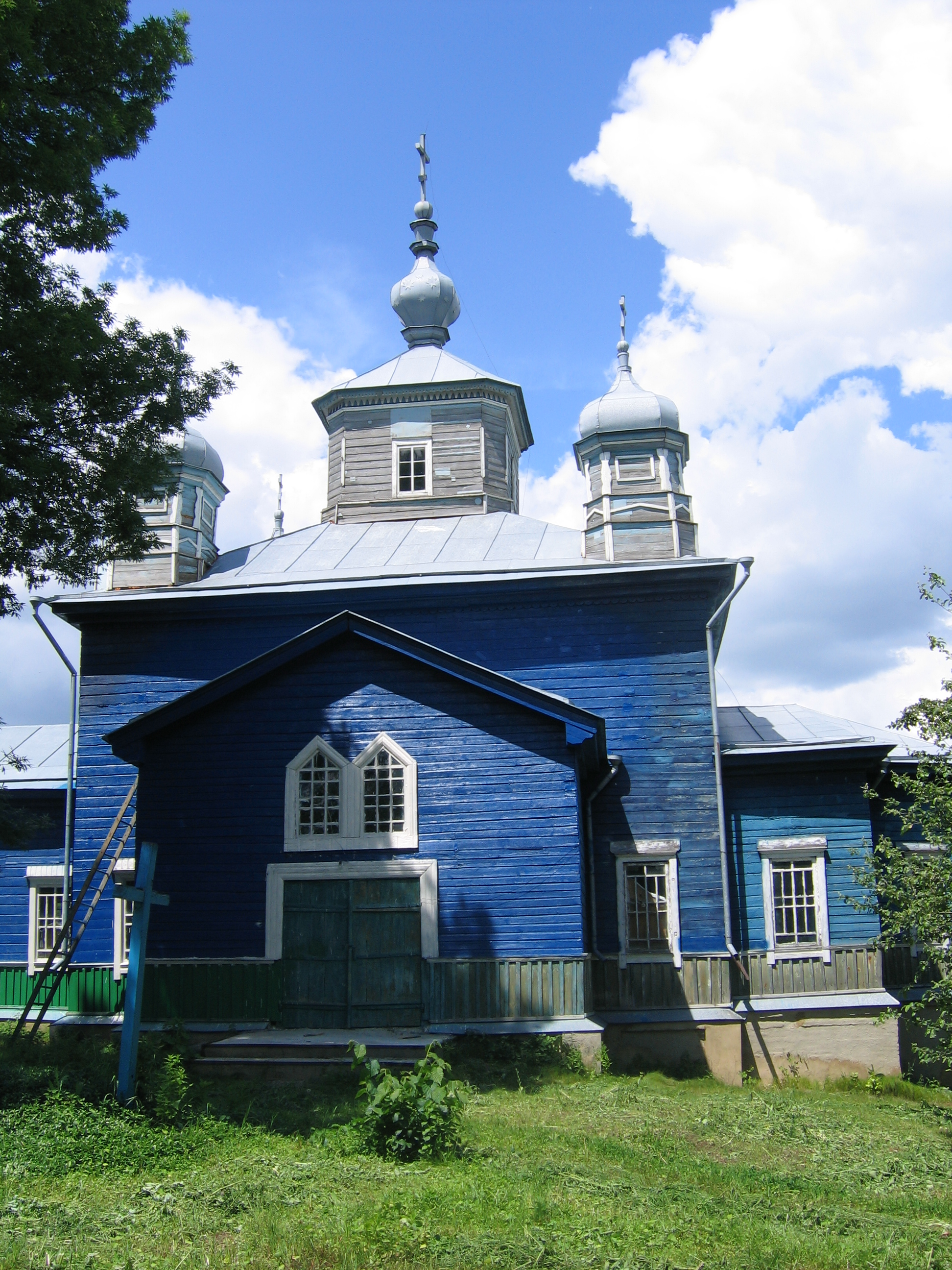
- Church in Kamiane
- Interactive map of Kamiane
- Location of Kamiane Kamiane (Ukraine)
- Coordinates: 50°27′46″N 34°17′37″E
- Country: Ukraine
- Oblast: Sumy Oblast
- Raion: Sumy Raion
- Hromada: Lebedyn urban hromada
- Founded: 1647
- Elevation: 126 m (413 ft)

Population (2001)
  - Total: 837
- Time zone: UTC+2
  - Summer (DST): UTC+3
- Postal code: 42233
- Area code: +380 5445

Kamiane (Ukrainian: Камяне; Russian: Каменное, romanized: Kammenoye) is a village in the Sumy Raion of Sumy Oblast (province), Ukraine.

Kamiane is a very old village with rich history, located on the right bank of Psel River, in the North-Eastern Ukraine.

In January 2010 a wooden church built in 1870 burned down in the village.
