= Prigorki =

Prigorki Пригорки
- Khutor
- Location within Belgorod Oblast Location within Russia
- Coordinates: 51°07′N 36°43′E
- Country: Russia
- Region: Belgorod Oblast
- District: Prokhorovsky District
- Time zone: UTC+3:00

Prigorki (Russian: Пригорки) is a rural locality (a khutor) in Prokhorovsky District, Belgorod Oblast, Russia. The population was 142 as of 2010. There are 3 streets.

== Geography ==
Prigorki is located 19 km north of Prokhorovka (the district's administrative centre) by road. Verkhnyaya Olshanka is the nearest rural locality.
