= Hrunivka =

Village in Sumy Oblast, Ukraine

Hrunivka Грунівка
- Village
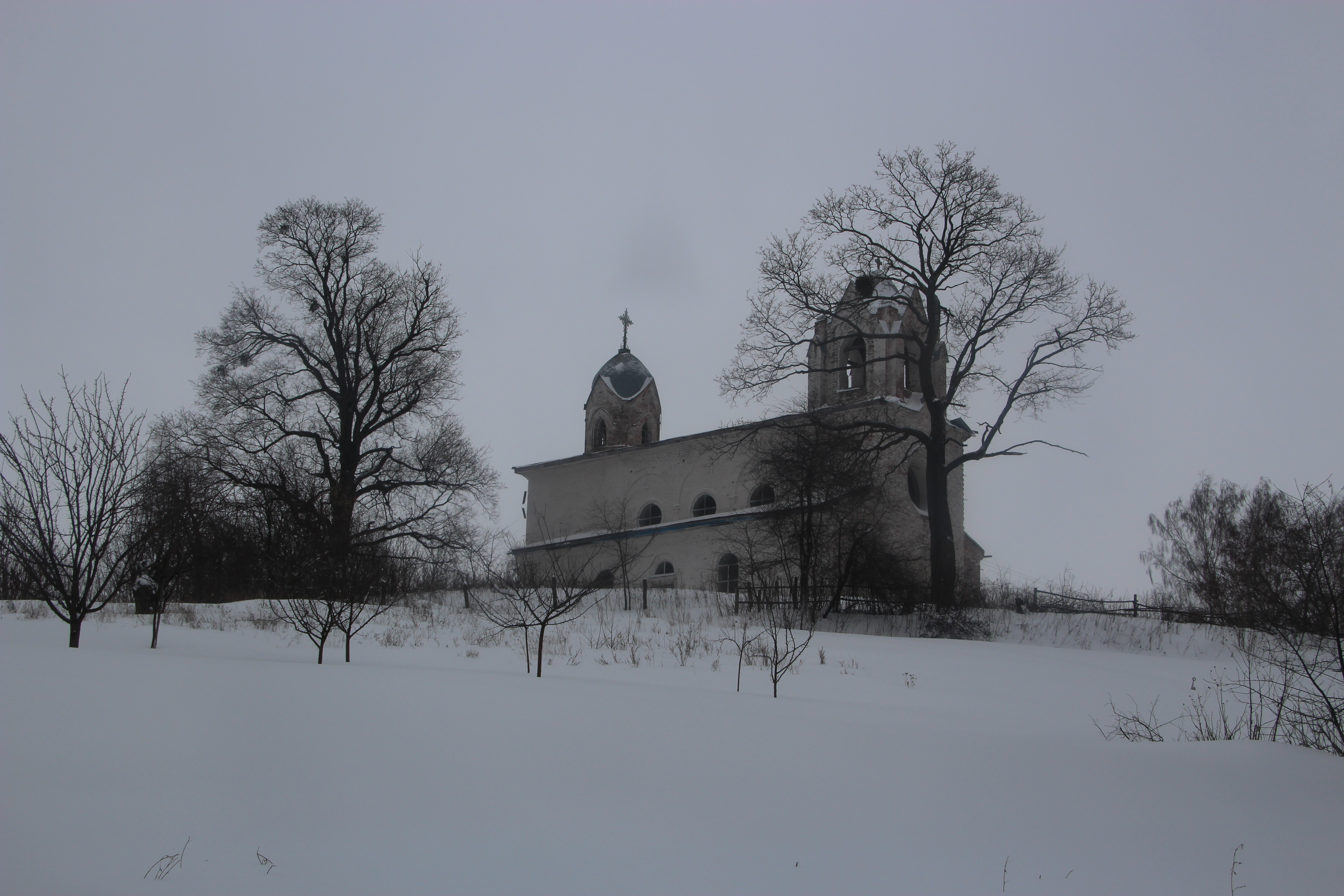
- St. Michael's Church, Hrunivka
- Interactive map of Hrunivka
- Location of Hrunivka Hrunivka (Ukraine)
- Coordinates: 50°59′39″N 35°6′43″E
- Country: Ukraine
- Oblast: Sumy Oblast
- Raion: Sumy Raion
- Hromada: Myropillia rural hromada
- Elevation: 172 m (564 ft)

Population (2001)
  - Total: 159
- Time zone: UTC+2
  - Summer (DST): UTC+3
- Postal code: 42420
- Area code: +380 5459

Hrunivka is a rural settlement in Myropillia rural hromada, Sumy Raion, Sumy Oblast, Ukraine. Until 2020, the local government body was the Sinnivska Village Council.

== Geography ==
The village is located on the left bank of the Psel River, 3 km upstream is Velyka Rybytsia, 2.5 km downstream is Barylivka, and on the opposite bank is Mogrytsia.

== History ==
The village suffered as a result of the Holodomor carried out by the Soviet Union in 1923–1933 and in 1946–1947.

On June 12, 2020, in accordance with the Resolution of the Cabinet of Ministers of Ukraine No. 723-r "On the Determination of Administrative Centers and Approval of Territories of Territorial Communities of Sumy Region", it became part of the Myropillia rural hromada.

On July 19, 2020, as a result of the administrative-territorial reform and liquidation of the Krasnopillia Raion, the village became part of the newly formed Sumy Raion.

== Religion ==
The Michael the Archangel religious community of the Ukrainian Orthodox Church of the Kyiv Patriarchate has been registered in the village since 1995. The abbot is Bishop Nikodim Kobzar.

== Population ==
According to the 2001 Ukrainian census, the village's population was 159 people. The main languages of the village were:

- Ukrainian 96.88%
- Russian 3.13%

By 2025, the population of the villlage was completely evacuated.
