= Vesyoly, Prokhorovsky District, Belgorod Oblast =

Vesyoly Весёлый
- Khutor
- Location within Belgorod Oblast Location within Russia
- Coordinates: 51°03′N 36°32′E
- Country: Russia
- Region: Belgorod Oblast
- District: Prokhorovsky District
- Time zone: UTC+3:00

Vesyoly (Russian: Весёлый) is a rural locality (a khutor) in Prokhorovsky District, Belgorod Oblast, Russia. The population was 123 as of 2010. There are 2 streets.

== Geography ==
Vesyoly is located 17 km west of Prokhorovka (the district's administrative centre) by road. Kostroma is the nearest rural locality.
