= Grayvoronsky Uyezd =

Subdivision of Kursk Governorate, Russian Empire

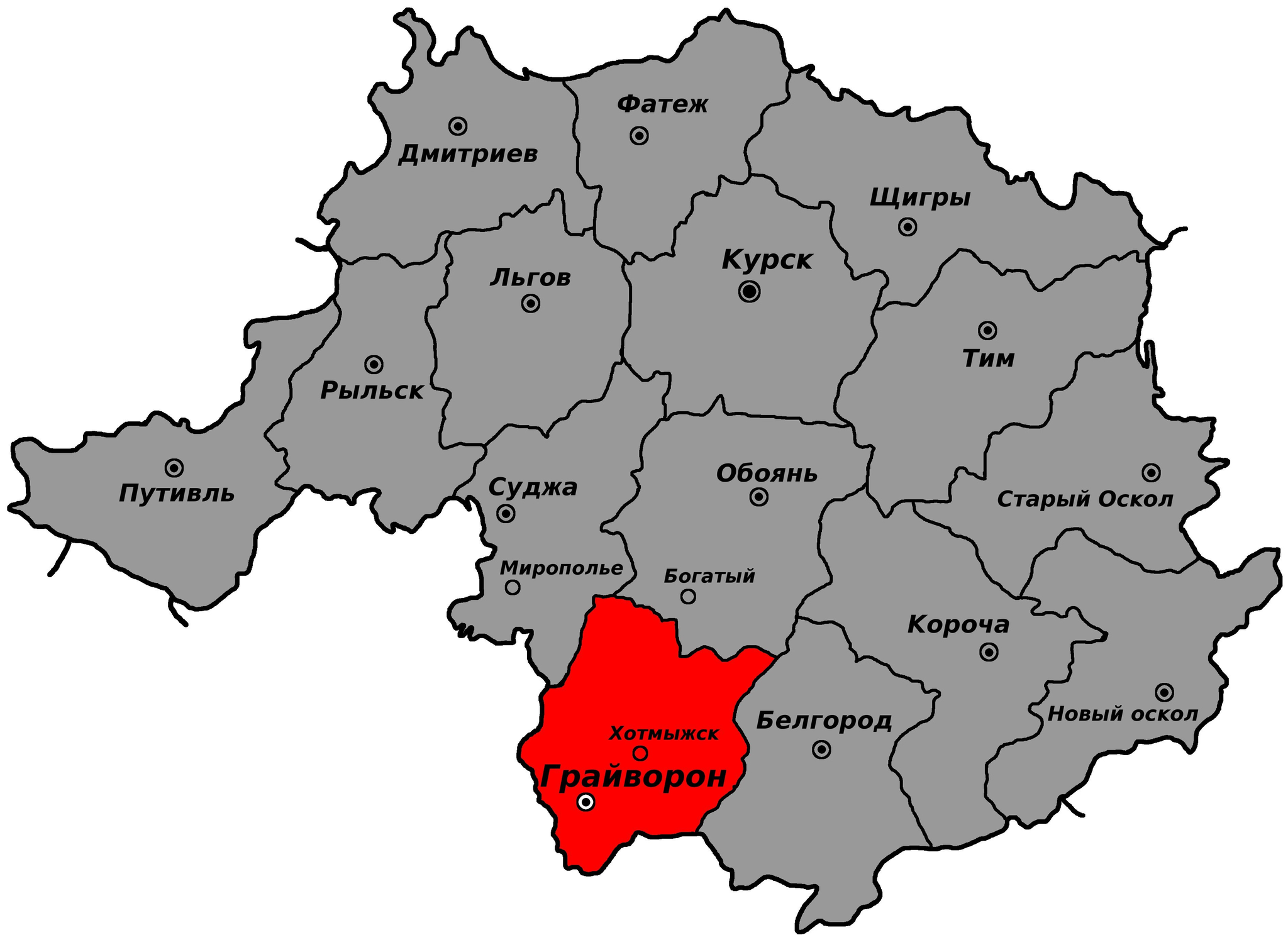
Map showing Grayvoron uyezd

Grayvoronsky Uyezd (Russian: Гра́йворонский уе́зд; Ukrainian: Грайворонський повіт, romanized: Hraivorons'kyi povit) was one of the subdivisions of the Kursk Governorate of the Russian Empire. It was situated in the southern part of the governorate. Its administrative centre was Grayvoron.

== Demographics ==
At the time of the Russian Empire Census of 1897, Grayvoronsky Uyezd had a population of 177 479. Of these, 58.9% spoke Ukrainian, 40.9% Russian and 0.1% Polish as their native language.
