= Velyka Rybytsia =

Village in Sumy Oblast, Ukraine

Velyka Rybytsia Велика Рибиця
- Village
- Interactive map of Velyka Rybytsia
- Location of Velyka Rybytsia Velyka Rybytsia (Ukraine)
- Coordinates: 51°0′44″N 35°10′28″E
- Country: Ukraine
- Oblast: Sumy Oblast
- Raion: Sumy Raion
- Hromada: Myropillia rural hromada
- Elevation: 147 m (482 ft)

Population (2001)
  - Total: 683
- Time zone: UTC+2
  - Summer (DST): UTC+3
- Postal code: 42418
- Area code: +380 5459

Velyka Rybytsia is a rural settlement in Myropillia rural hromada, Sumy Raion, Sumy Oblast, Ukraine. Until 2020, the local government body was the Zapsillia Village Council.

== Geography ==
The village of Velyka Rybytsia is located on the left bank of the Psel River at the confluence of the Rybytsia River, upstream at a distance of 4 km is the village of Myropillia, downstream at a distance of 3.5 km is the village of Hrunivka, on the opposite bank is the village of Zapsillia. The river in this place is winding, forming estuaries, old ponds and swampy lakes. To the north of the village is the Myropilskyi nature reserve.

The village is located a few kilometers from the state border of Russia.

== History ==
In 1979, the communist authorities destroyed the wooden Church of the Assumption of the Blessed Virgin Mary.

The village suffered as a result of the Holodomor carried out by the Soviet Union in 1923–1933 and in 1946–1947.

In the 1991 referendum to confirm the act of restoring Ukraine's state independence, the absolute majority of villagers voted positively.

On June 12, 2020, in accordance with the Resolution of the Cabinet of Ministers of Ukraine No. 723-r "On the Determination of Administrative Centers and Approval of Territories of Territorial Communities of Sumy Region", it became part of the Myropillia rural hromada.

On July 19, 2020, as a result of the administrative-territorial reform and liquidation of the Krasnopillia Raion, the village became part of the newly formed Sumy Raion.

=== Russo-Ukrainian War ===
On July 14, 2024, the village was shelled by Russian forces. Two attacks were recorded: two explosions, probably an FPV drone. As a result of the shelling, a private residential building was damaged.

On August 11, 2024, the village was shelled by Russian forces. According to the Operational Command North, three shellings were recorded: eight explosions, probably KAB.

== Population ==
According to the 2001 Ukrainian census, the village's population was 683 people. The main languages of the village were:

- Ukrainian 96.81%
- Russian 3.19%

In 2025, the population of the village was 5 people.
