= Konotop =

City in Sumy Oblast, Ukraine

Konotop Конотоп
- City
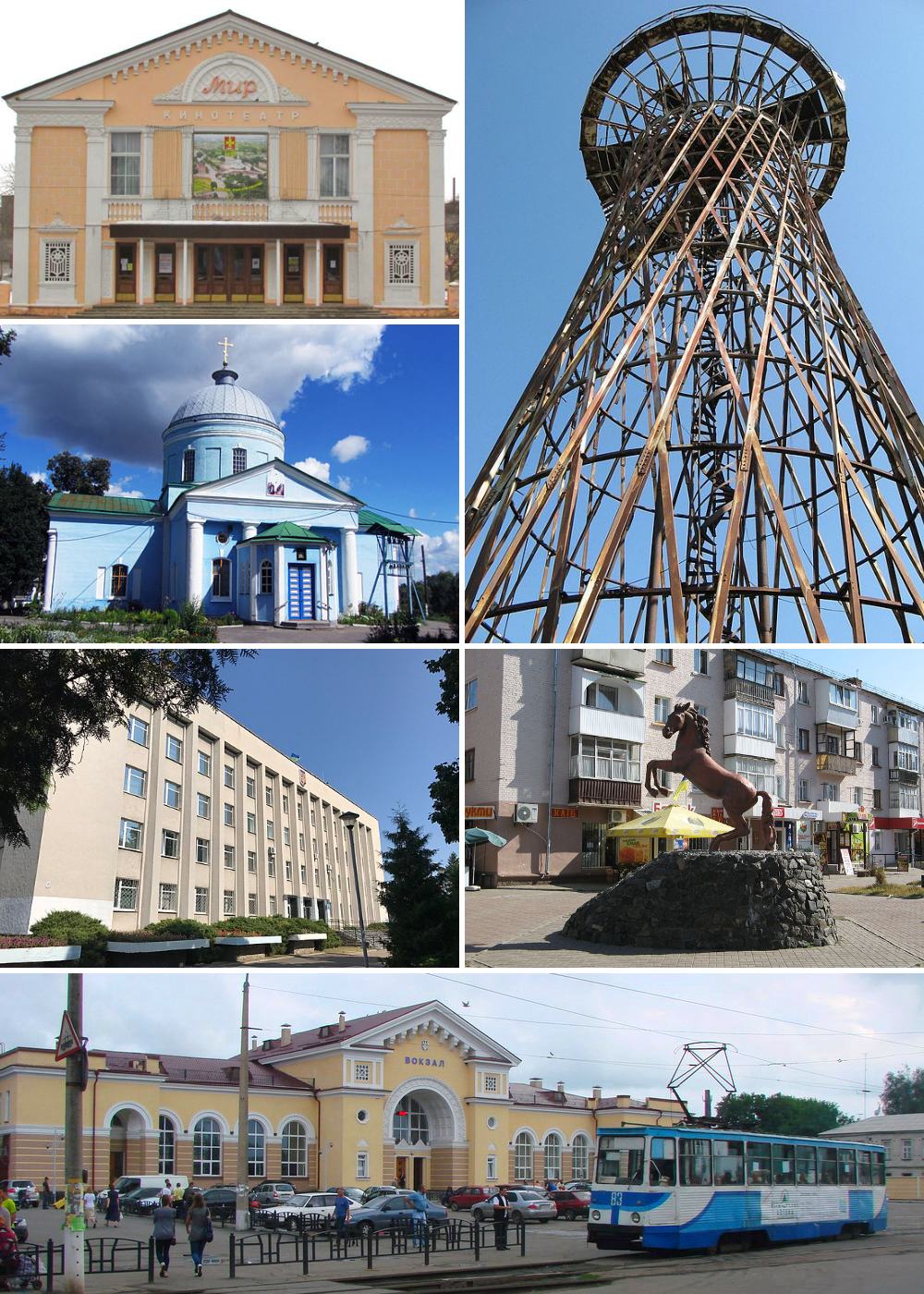
- Counterclockwise (from upper right): Shukhov Tower, Myr Cinema, Ascension Cathedral, Konotop City Council Building, Konotop railway station and tram, Monument of Horse

- Flag Coat of arms
- Interactive map of Konotop
- Location within Sumy Oblast Location within Ukraine
- Coordinates: 51°13′N 33°12′E
- Country: Ukraine
- Oblast: Sumy Oblast
- Raion: Konotop Raion
- Hromada: Konotop urban hromada
- Founded: 1634

Government
  - Mayor: Artem Semenikhin (Svoboda)

Area
  - Total: 43.78 km^{2} (16.90 sq mi)
- Elevation: 142 m (466 ft)

Population (2022)
  - Total: 83,543
- Time zone: UTC+2 (EET)
  - Summer (DST): UTC+3 (EEST)
- Postal codes: 41600–41615
- Area code: +380 5447
- Website: Official website

Konotop (Note: See § Name for alternative spellings and pronunciations.) is a city in northeastern Ukraine located in Sumy Oblast. Konotop serves as the administrative center of Konotop Raion within the oblast. Its population before the Russian invasion of Ukraine was approximately 83,543 (2022 estimate), making it the second-largest city in Sumy Oblast.

Konotop is believed to have been settled in 1634, with the granting of the settlement to a Polish nobleman. A fortress was then built on the site of the settlement, which led to the city being the site of numerous battles in the late 1600s, such as the Battle of Konotop and the Battle of Konotop (1668), after it was seized by the Cossack Hetmanate. The Cossacks then ruled the city for decades until 1764, when the Hetmanate was incorporated into the Little Russia Governorate of the Russian Empire, and later the Chernigov Governorate. The city would then rapidly grow, shifting from agricultural work to relying on railroad work, as multiple important railway lines started running through the city in the late 1800s. After the October Revolution, it was claimed by the Ukrainian SSR after a change of hands in 1919, and was annexed into the Soviet Union in 1922. The city was then devastated by World War II, where it was the site of a prisoner of war camp for captured Soviets, with an estimated 30,000 people dying in the city in total during this time. After gradually recovering, the "Chervonyi Metalist" electromechanical plant took on a greater role in the city's economy, and after the collapse of the Soviet Union the city became part of a newly independent Ukraine. In 2022, as part of the northern front of the Russian invasion, the city briefly came under siege in February 2022, although by April all Russians left the entire raion. Since then, the city has been under full Ukrainian control.

Konotop has historically been an important railway centre in Sumy Oblast, although the industry has since then shifted to aircraft repair and the manufacturing of internal combustion engines. Cultural landmarks include the Shukhov Water Tower and memorials to the Battle of Konotop and Kazimir Malevich. The city is also well known more recently for its association with the witches of Konotop, which started with the novella The Witch of Konotop in 1833 and has since been adapted into multiple plays and films. The main museums of the city are the O. M. Lazarevsky Konotop Regional Studies Museum, the Mikhail Dragomirov Estate Museum, and the Konotop Aviation Museum. The city is home to the association football club FC Shakhtar Konotop, which plays in the Sumy Oblast Football Championships, with their home ground being at Yunist Stadium. The city is also home to multiple institutions of higher education, most of which are branches of Sumy State University.

== Name ==
=== Current name ===
- Ukrainian: Конотоп [konoˈtɔp]
- Russian: Конотоп [kənɐˈtop]

=== Name history ===
Konotop itself is not unique and is a very common toponym not just in Ukraine, but in other Slavic countries such as Poland, Belarus, and Russia. Konotop has also occasionally been referenced by Russian-language speakers as a placeholder name for a remote, backwater place. It is also a common hydronym, being used to describe the right tributary of Yezuch (part of the river Desna), a right tributary of the Cerem (part of the river Sluch), and as a left tributary of the river Pripyat. In several dialects of Ukrainian, the konotop (Ukrainian: конотоп) also refers to the herbaceous plant, common knotweed. However, the first use of the settlement name to refer to the present-day city in the oblast was in the Polish language in October 1634. In a document, the then-King of Poland, Władysław IV Vasa, approved the granting of land to a local nobleman known as Mykola Cetysov. The translations on to what exactly the king said when granting the settlement differ: an early translation says that the king said "Конотоп, Городище, Єзуч", referencing Konotop as a hillfort, while a later translation reads it as "Конотоп, (та) городище Язуче", referring to Konotop as a separate settlement that was not a hillfort, and that Yazuche was the hillfort. Unofficial, non-primary sources in Polish even refer to Konotop earlier than this, stating that Mykhailo Voronych, a Polish official from Baturyn, attempted to "colonise" a Konotop in 1629-1631 by offering exemption from levies. However, the land grant by the king from 1634 is considered the earliest primary source.

==== Etymology of Konotop ====
The exact origin of the word konotop is disputed, with two different accounts. The most widespread version is that the word konotop denotes a place where horses drowned, that is, any swampy, impassable place. This theory is believed to come from scholar V. A. Zhuchkevych, who found that derivations meaning "horse-drowning ford" are commonplace and not a local legend. He also argued for this interpretation because of the nearby village of Hruzke, which is derived from грузнути, meaning "to get stuck or mired", suggesting the area was commonly described as boggy. Eduard Murzaev, another linguist, also says the word itself comes from "horses stomp", which was transformed into a noun with the help of the word-forming method of baseline. Two local legends are said to explain why the name came to be, although neither is thought to be historically accurate. The first legend says that Konotop as a settlement existed even before the Mongol-Tatar invasion. According to legend, during the passage of the Tatar cavalry in the area, many horses and riders died in impassable swamps, leading to the area being called konotop — a swampy place where horses drowned. The second legend says the name came to be during a visit by the Russian Empress, Catherine II, when her horses were said to have drowned while crossing into the settlement.

Another, albeit less widespread theory, is that the word konotop is actually derived from a nearby hydronym, instead of the hydronym being derived from the settlement. The specific river that the city is sometimes said to be named after is the Konotopka River, which is said to have flowed alongside the southern side of the fortress in the city and is a left tributary of the Yezuch River. In this version, the name of the river is said to derive from an Old East Slavic word meaning "a whirlpool in a river".

== History ==
=== Early history ===
Settlements existing along the Yezuch riverbanks are thought to have existed during the Neolithic era, including in nearby areas such as modern-day Dukhanivka and Khyzhky, which are directly east, a short distance from Konotop. The excavations there are often classified into their own culture, which was called the Lysohubivka culture by the archaeologist V. Neprina in the 1970s. The area is also mentioned during the Bronze Age, with the numerous kurgans that are documented in the surrounding villages, including a stone axe-hammer from the Bronze Age that was found in Konotop itself. Modern-day Konotop would then be referenced again during the Kievan Rus' period. During this time, the region would become a contested area as part of the Novgorod-Seversk of the Principality of Chernigov, with the struggles between the different branches of the Rurikid dynasty. However, Konotop itself is not directly mentioned within the Primary Chronicle despite most of the surrounding villages being so, which has led some historians such as Ivan Lysyi to theorise that the town of Lypovytsk, which was mentioned in the chronicles, is Konotop. This remained unconfirmed and is merely a local theory. In excavations done on the left bank of the Yezuch in 1997-98, there was evidence found that the area was settled during the Kievan Rus' period, specifically during the late era, with the finding of an ancient settlement that covered 7.5 hectares, although no fortifications were found that would've been typical. A later 2005 excavation, however, did find Old Rus' material such as ceramics and defensive fortifications such as a rampart in the site that may have been "Yazuche", which would be later mentioned in 1634, and is believed to be an ancient settlement on the territory of Konotop.

However, regardless of whether the settlement actually existed during this time, the area would be destroyed by the Mongol invasion of Kievan Rus'. The area was believed to be resettled during the reign of Vytautas the Great as part of the Grand Duchy of Lithuania. After the Lithuanian–Muscovite War (1500–1503), Konotop was annexed into the Grand Duchy of Moscow, which would last until the Truce of Deulino following the Polish–Russian War (1609–1618), when it became part of the Polish–Lithuanian Commonwealth. After gaining the area, the Polish government would then start a wave of Polonisation of the lands, which is thought to have affected Yazuche, with an administrative official known as Mykhailo Voronych undertaking these efforts specifically in the area of Konotop from 1629-1931 by offering settlers a thirty-year exemption on levies.

=== Founding and Cossacks ===
==== Polish founding ====
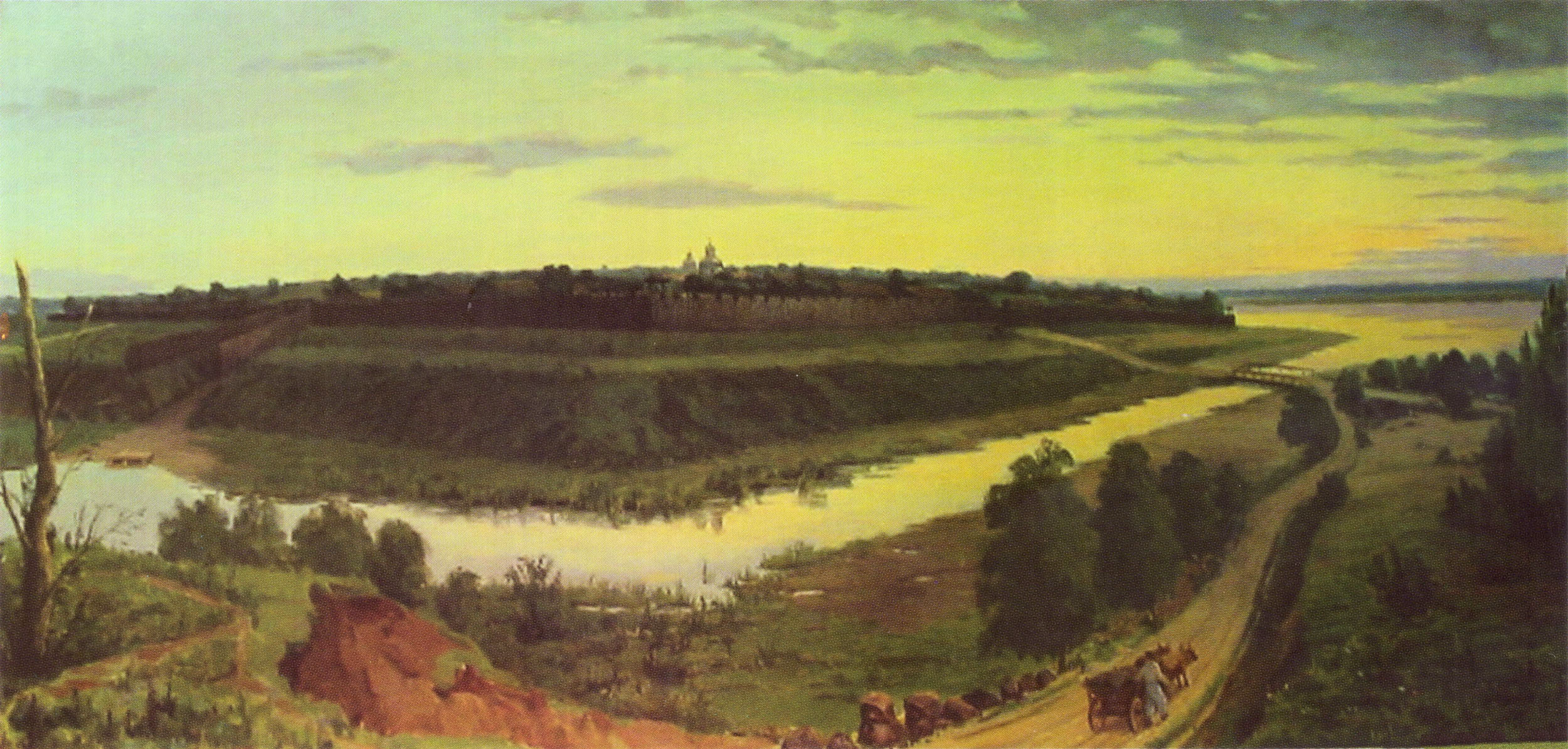
Painting of Konotop Fortress

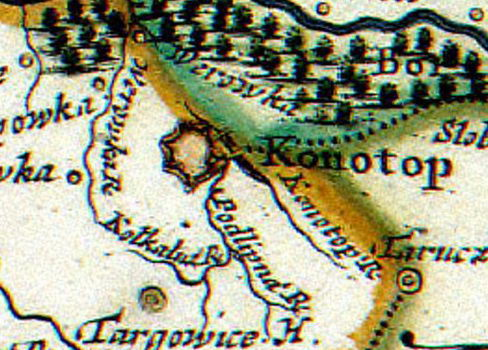
Konotop on a map from 1650

The first mention of the settlement of Konotop would be made in 1634. A document dated to October 1634 mentions Konotop in the context of the King of Poland, Władysław IV, granting land to a nobleman known as Mykola Cetysov, including the settlement of Konotop. A fortress was then decided to be built in this land, which began construction in 1634 on direct orders of the king, so that it could be used against the Muscovites. The fortress was built on land that theoretically belonged to a landowner from Putyvl, Nykyfor Yatsyn, on the confluence of the Yezuch and Konotopka rivers. Then, in 1635, a Polish nobleman known as Pidkova founded a khutor called the "Novoselytsia estate" near the fortress. In 1640, the fortress was reconstructed to be a regional stronghold, which was ordered by the starosta of Novhorod-Siverskyi, Pyasochynsky. The new, reconstructed fortress was a quadrilateral shape with ramparts, wood-reinforced walls, and three gates that were said to lead to Kyiv, Putyvl, and Romny. The fortress itself then came under the administration of the starosta Sosnovskyi, and then the area of Konotop was given to Pyasochynsky's son-in-law, Jerzy Ossoliński, who was the Chancellor of Poland.

==== Khmelnytsky Uprising ====
After the start of the Khmelnytsky Uprising, where the Cossacks rebelled against the commonwealth, the area was seized by the Cossack Hetmanate. Konotop then became a sotnia town as part of the Chernigov Regiment, and then the Nizhyn Regiment. The settlement of Konotop was also an important regional place for diplomacy during this time, and on 2 April 1649 was the location (albiet five versts outside the now city) of a diplomatic mission of Russia led by I. Unkovsky who had arrived to meet with the Hetman of the Zaporizihian Host, Bohdan Khmelnytsky. It was confirmed that Konotop existed, at least in Western sources, by Guillaume Le Vasseur de Beauplan, who published the edition of the General Map of Ukraine referencing Konotop in 1650. Following the signing of the Treaty of Bila Tserkva between the Cossacks and the Commonwealth, former estate owners from the Commonwealth were permitted to return to the Chernihiv Voivodeship and resettle after they had left following the uprising. Thus, the Poles returned to Konotop, although it was reported there were frequent clashes between the Cossacks and Poles. However, soon after, the situation changed with the Cossack victory during the Battle of Batih, and anti-Polish uprisings began across the voivodeship. In the Eyewitness Chronicle, it is said that specifically in Konotop, the residents then killed the family of Stanisław Sosnowski (a nobleman who had held the post of town administrator), throwing their bodies into a well. In the so-called "Konotop miracle", it is then said the bodies resurfaced with no signs of decay on the Feast of the Cross after the water rose for no apparent reason. However, a later 2021 analysis of the chronicle account argues that the killings, in fact, did not take place at Konotop but at a hillfort known as Hermanivske, which was on the opposite bank of the Yezuch.

==== Polish–Russian War and Left-bank Uprising ====
===== Battle of Konotop (1659) =====
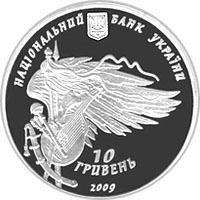
Coin in honour of the 350th anniversary of the Battle of Konotop (2009).

In September 1658, the Cossacks under Vyhovsky entered negotiations with the Poles, which concluded with the Treaty of Hadiach, in which the Cossacks would join the Commonwealth in equal standing in response to increasing Muscovite control of the Hetmanate. In response, a large Russian army Aleksey Trubetskoy allied with the pro-Russian faction of the Cossacks under Ivan Bezpaly invaded the Hetmanate, and started a siege of the settlement of Konotop in 1659. At the time, the city was being defended by the Cossack Hryhoriy Hulyanytsky, alongside a few regiments. The initial siege of the city lasted ten weeks before Vyhovsky returned to the city after having brokered an alliance with the Crimean Tatars under Mehmed IV Giray alongside the Poles. After arriving, on 29 June 1659 the combined forces ambushed a Russian detachment led by the Princes Semyon Pozharsky (who was killed) and Semyon Lvov (who was taken as a prisoner of war). This led Trubetskoy's forces to retreat and withdraw from Konotop to Putyvl. The battle has since been famous in Ukrainian culture, with numerous songs and poems dedicated to the event. During the Soviet era, the battle was largely dismissed, although since independence, Ukrainian works have largely commemorated it as a significant defeat of the Russian army, with some sources putting the amount of Russian losses as high as 40,000. However, archival research has only put the number killed from about 4,700 to 6,700.

Despite the win at Konotop, in the aftermath many of the cities in the Hetmanate rebelled against Vyhovsky, which was encouraged by the Muscovites, including the towns of Poltava, Hadyach, and Romny. In September 1659, a large rebellion began, with many Left-Bank Cossacks defecting to the Muscovites, including Vasyl Zolotarenko and Ivan Sirko, who installed Yurii Khmelnytsky as Hetman while Vyhovsky surrendered. In the resulting Pereiaslav Articles, the Muscovites returned to the Hetmanate, while the Cossacks were severely restricted of their autonomy in return for protection. In 1664, the settlement was briefly attacked and plundered by the Poles under King John II Casimir Vasa. According to the 1666 Census Books, the population of Konotop was divided into two companies. The first company consisted of 136 households (388 people), with the second company consisting of 238 households (413 people). The majority of the 474 households were employed in the agricultural sector, specifically crop farming, sowing wheat, rye, buckwheat, and millet using horses and oxen. Wealthier Cossacks and the officers worked in flour milling instead, working near the Konotopka River where there were two watermills. In the Truce of Andrusovo of 1667, which ended the Polish–Russian War (1654–1667), the settlement, as part of the Siever lands, came under the sovereignty of the Tsardom of Muscovy while being de facto independent.

===== Second Battle of Konotop (1668) and Konotop Articles =====
The Cossacks were immediately dissatisfied with the terms at Andrusovo, which led to the Left-Bank uprising against Muscovy and the Battle of Konotop of 1668. The Cossacks, together with the Crimean Tatars, went to intercept the retreating army of Grigory Romodanovsky as they went to Putyvl. The Cossacks reached the forces of Romodanovsky on 14 October as they were crossing the Kukolka River, which was very close to Konotop. The Cossack-Tatars inflicted heavy casualties on the Muscovites at Konotop, although the Muscovites were still able to cross the river and retreat to Putyvl. Thus, the Muscovites were driven out of Left-bank Ukraine. However, the Cossacks under Petro Doroshenko then decided to disband to Kozelets after the Tatar alliance broke down, which allowed Petro Sukhoviy the chance to attack the supporters of Doroshenko together with the Tatars who joined him. After this, the uprising was suppressed, and the Hlukhiv Articles were signed, which cemented Russian control over left-bank Ukraine, although with a higher degree of autonomy.

After Hetman Demian Mnohohrishny was arrested on charges of treason by defecting to the Ottomans, the Muscovites decided to hold a new election for the office of Hetman, which was staged near Konotop instead of the capital of Baturyn. In June 1672, at Kozacha Dibrova, Ivan Samoylovych was elected the new Hetman of Left-bank Ukraine. At the rada, immediately after his election, Samoylovych also signed the new so-called Konotop Articles. These articles broadly reaffirmed the agreements made in the Hlukhiv Articles (that is, autonomy of the Left-bank), although the articles also added new restrictions that severely tightened control of the office of Hetman: the Hetman could not execute or dismiss officers without a review, could no conduct foreign relations unless confirmed by decree, were forbidden contact with Doroshenko, and Cossack ambassadors could not take part in negotiations between Poland Muscovy in regards to the Cossacks.

===== Great Northern War and aftermath =====
Plan of Konotop c. late 1600s-early 1700s.

By the late 1600s, Konotop had become divided into three parts: with the great town making up the outer ring and being the poorer part of the city, the next ring being the small town where wealthier Cossacks resided, and at the very center of the city were the Cossack starshyna. The town was chiefly owned by sotnyk Fedir Kandyba, who had 1,730 serfs and a lot of land in the town.

On 2 November 1708, Konotop came under the theatre of the Great Northern War after the Sack of Baturyn since the Hetman Ivan Mazepa switched his allegiance to Charles XII of Sweden against the Russians, although most of the Hetmanate did not join his faction, instead joining the newly elected Ivan Skoropadsky. Konotop became important again because it was situated in a triangle of protected cities such as Bakhmach, and there were mercenaries loyal to Mazepa nearby. Reconnaissance parties were reported in nearby Popivka by mid-November, and soon afterwards dragoons under Carl Ewald von Rönne clashed with the Swedes and Mazepa loyalists on the road outside the road to Konotop. However, Rönne chose to retreat, withdrawing to Konotop instead. On 16 November 1708, the Swedes under General Lindroth reached the town, but were defeated by the Sotnia of Konotop, together with the Cossacks of the villages of Velyky Sambir and Maly Sambir.

However, the population of Cossacks continued to dwindle from a recorded figure in 1643 of 314 Cossacks, to 263 by 1717. Meanwhile, 701 households were recorded. In 1751, just after the last Hetman took office, Kirill Razumovsky, the towns and their revenue were assigned to the prominent Kochubey family instead of the earlier system where a sotnyk answered to the Hetman, a sign of the eroding Cossack authority in response to Mazepa's switch. It is said that under the Kochubey family, the peasants' condition worsened into "effective serfdom".

=== Russian Empire ===
In 1764, the Hetmanate was incorporated into the Little Russia Governorate of the Russian Empire. According to a description of the years 1765-69, the town had 3,100 inhabitants in its territory. In 1781, this system was abolished, and the city was transferred to the Novgorod-Seversky Viceroyalty as a county seat. After being transferred, in 1782 the town was granted municipal rights. In a 1782 description required of every viceregency town by Governor-General Pyotr Rumyantsev, the city was described of consisting of 750 buildings, which placed the city fourth in the total number of buildings within the territory behind Hlukhiv, Starodub, and Korop. The description also recorded that the same street names still preserved the memories of Cossacks who had affected Konotop; some streets were named after the cities that Konotop connected to, and some were named after the churches that had popped up like Vavaryanska (burned down in 1775) and Soborna. The city was shortly thereafter transferred twice rapidly to the Second Little Russia Governorate in 1796 and then to the Chernigov Governorate in 1802. The city would remain part of the Chernigov Governorate until the end of the Russian Empire thereafter as the seat of the Konotopsky Uyezd. In 1803, a new development plan was proposed for the city to regularise the layout under Emperor Alexander I, centering the city around the old fortress site, and also connecting it more to other cities. At that point, the population was 7,000 and the industry was minimal and still centered around agriculture. The redevelopment was only every partially completed.

==== French invasion of Russia (1812) ====
In January 1811, the new city was chosen as the site of a reserve artillery depot, alongside the cities of Pskov, Smolensk, and Starodub. Konotop was chosen because it was not near any front but was close enough that it could receive recruits from Chernihiv, Kursk, Voronezh, Minsk, and Vitebsk, among other cities, and also it had many spare buildings. However, barely a week later, a new order by the Russian government decided to instead move the artillery depots of Konotop and Starodub to the bigger cities of Bryansk and Hlukhiv, although Konotop and Starodub still became regular infantry recruit depots. Thus, as part of the Napoleonic Wars, the city started fueling in replacements to the Imperial Russian Army, specifically the 18th Infantry Division. By mid-1812, the depot in Konotop had trained 6 infantry battalions and 4 cavalry squadrons. In June 1812, as the French invasion of Russia started, it was planned by Mikhail Miloradovich that the regional depots in the area would bring these newly trained recruits to a very large reserve Kaluga corps. This, in fact, never happened because of the French advance into Russia and the subsequent Russian retreat, since by then there were no officers in the area that could lead the recruits, and instead the men trained at the depot in Konotop were displaced into regiments like the Second Western Army and Third Reserve Army of Observation. More than 2,000 Konotop residents ended up fighting the French.

==== 1800s to 1917 ====
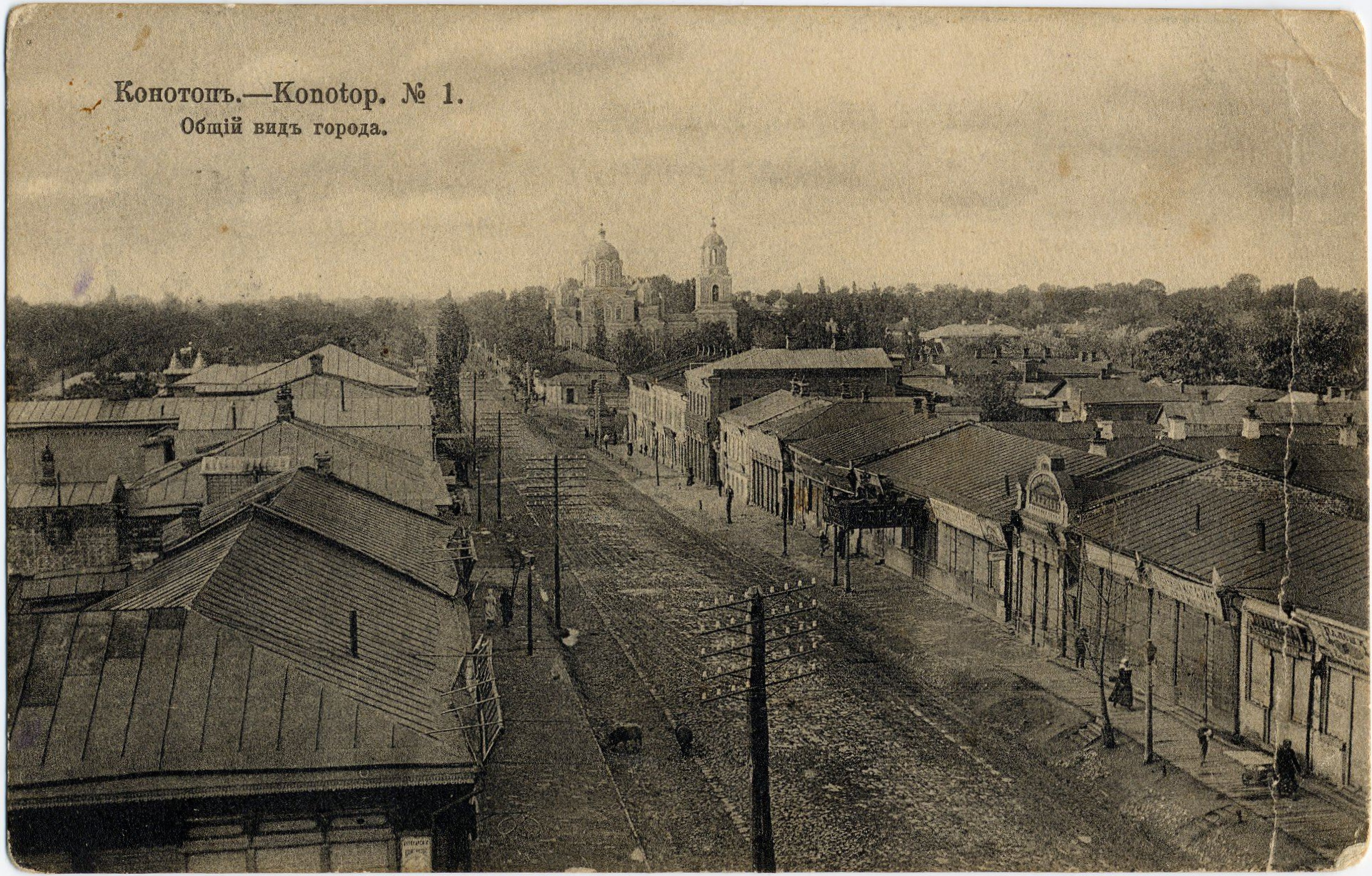
Konotop c. early 1900s, at least prior to 1917, in a Russian postcard.

After the war ended, the economy of the city started to slowly shift to artisan work. There were no large businesses yet; at the time, only two wax-processing operations and a brewing factory worked primitively. The agricultural sector was also important to the city, particularly its grains, with an estimate in 1850 putting the total amount of Konotop grain sold at one million poods. Despite this, the infrastructure in the city was still relatively underdeveloped, with the first school, which was only for children of the nobility, opening up in 1812 and then a full city-wide public school in 1839, and no doctor's post was established until well into 1896. The Emancipation reform of 1861, which was applied to the entire uezd, some land was given back to the peasants (a maximum of 2 and 3/4 desyatinas), although there was still a land shortage.After the reforms, the industrial side of the city rapidly developed with the establishment of the Kursk-Kyiv railway in 1867, which ran through the city, and in 1895 a new Konotop-Moscow line was formed that linked to the Kursk-Kyiv line. Large-scale enterprises like a large brewery were opened up in 1882, a cast-iron factory in 1898, a spring-manufacturing plant, and brick works, among others. It was reported that by the early 1990s, there were 35 industrial enterprises in the city, most servicing the railway connections, with the population also growing from nearly 9,000 in 1859 to 18,441 in 1897. However, the infrastructure still did not receive much funding from the city council, although a new zemstvo hospital was opened up in 1870 (which served the entire uezd). This was followed by the first library in 1901, and a new school in 1905.

During the Russian Revolution of 1905, the city became a hotspot of strikes throughout January to February of 1905. The main workers, the rail-junction workers, struck again later in October 1905, which was joined by the other railway-adjacent workers later that month. Together, they formed their own Soviet for the Konotop station of the railway, which had 86 members and temporarily stopped all railway traffic going through Konotop. After another massive strike in December, martial law was declared that month and Russian detachments were deployed to the city. Thus, many of the workers accused of participating in the strikes were then tried, while police in the city raided the branch of the Russian Social Democratic Labour Party which had operated underground illegally. In 1907, police also arrested most of the new revolutionaries in the cities, thus ceasing most of the dissent for some time in Konotop. After the outbreak of the First World War, the city's railway station saw heavy use during the Southwestern Front, and a new munitions factory was opened up in the city. In addition, wartime shortages of labour due to most of the city's men being conscripted led to many foreigners being brought to the city. This first occurred in December of 1916, when 25 Central Asian labourers were brought in to work at the new munitions factory, and after the new workers were assessed positively, it was planned that more would be brought in although this never occurred due to the civil war shortly thereafter.

=== Soviet era ===
==== Russian Civil War ====
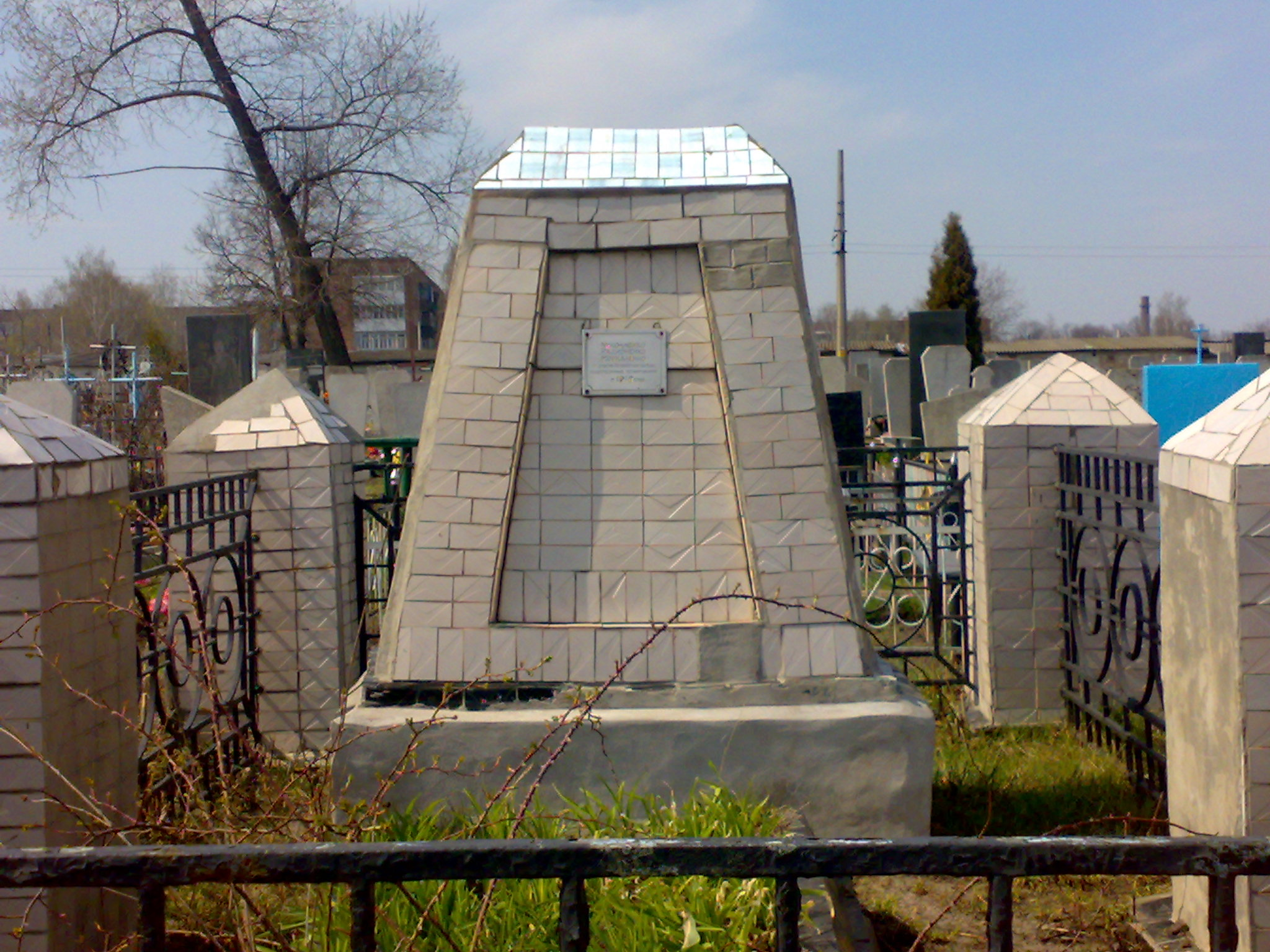
Mass grave in Konotop of participants in the Russian Civil War

After the October Revolution, the city was suddenly seized by the Bolsheviks. Afterwards, on 2 November, a revkom was formed in the city that combined the earlier Soviet. However, Bolshevik control would not last long, as on 28 November 1917 the Ukrainian People's Republic would take control of the city after disarming the garrison and dispersing the revkom. The units that participated in the takeover were the Sich Riflemen. However, the Soviets quickly advanced in early January 1918, moving in from their hub of Vorozhba. A telegram during this time reported that in Konotop, the town was defended by Ukrainian military cadets and a battalion, although the mood was wary. The Bolsheviks retook the city on 15 January 1918.

In accordance with the Treaty of Brest-Litovsk, in which the Central Powers recognised the UPR and agreed to provide military aid against the Bolsheviks, the Austro-Hungarians and Germans soon arrived to help the Ukrainians in retaking the city. Together, these forces retook the city on the night of 17-18 March 1918 after the second Treaty of Brest-Litovsk had been signed, in which the Bolsheviks recognised the UPR's control of Ukraine. In April 1918, the UPR was overthrown by the Ukrainian State, and so the city passed into the State's hands. During this time, the Grey Division was stationed in the city to protect it. In November 1918, the previous treaty was annulled after the Central Powers' defeat in World War I, leading the Bolsheviks to return to Ukraine. The Bolsheviks retook the city on 21 January 1919, the last time the city would change hands. Despite this, the Bolsheviks faced internal instability throughout the spring with so-called "counter-revolutionary conspiracies" and bandits. As the White movement advanced throughout the summer of 1919, many organisations in Konotop began evacuating early, although the Whites would never reach the area.

==== Interwar period ====
In 1922, the Ukrainian SSR was annexed into the Soviet Union, thus bringing Konotop under Soviet control. The following year, in 1923, the city became the seat of the Konotop Okruha until 1932, when, during administrative reform, it became the seat of the newly-formed Konotop Raion. The raion was initially part of Chernihiv Oblast until 1939, when Sumy Oblast was created. In the mid-1920s, Konotop was the location of the okruha commission of Istpart, which was tasked with presenting materials about the 1905 Revolution and the Russian Civil War in the region. There was planned to be a museum in the city by early 1926, although the commission would soon after be dissolved in 1927. During the interwar period, the city's industrial sector also grew. The previous munitions factory was restructured in 1929 to become an electromechanical plant known as "Chervonyi Metalist", which served the coal industry, and the locomotive-repairs workshop became the Konotop Locomotive-and-Wagon Repair Plant (KPVRZ).

Religiously, however, the city was a heavy target of the Soviet anti-religious legislation following the unofficial policy of Soviet state atheism. Many clergy in the city were detained, including the city's priest V. Prokhorenko, who was executed in 1921, and the registered Orthodox Christian community fell very quickly. In addition, many of the historical churches were destroyed, such as Alexander Nevsky Cathedral, which was built in 1888, and the Dormition of the Most Holy Theotokos Church, which was built in 1897. One of the only surviving churches was the wooden St. Nicholas Church, which was built in 1891, when the parishioners surrounded the detachment that was intended to confiscate the property. There was also an acceleration of renaming the city's streets to match Soviet ideology, such as the new streets named for Karl Marx and the Paris Commune. Like many areas in the region, the Holodomor affected the city, although not as much as the surrounding agricultural villages, after the amount of grain quotas was rapidly raised. In total, it is estimated that around 132 people died in the city during the Holodomor.

==== World War II ====
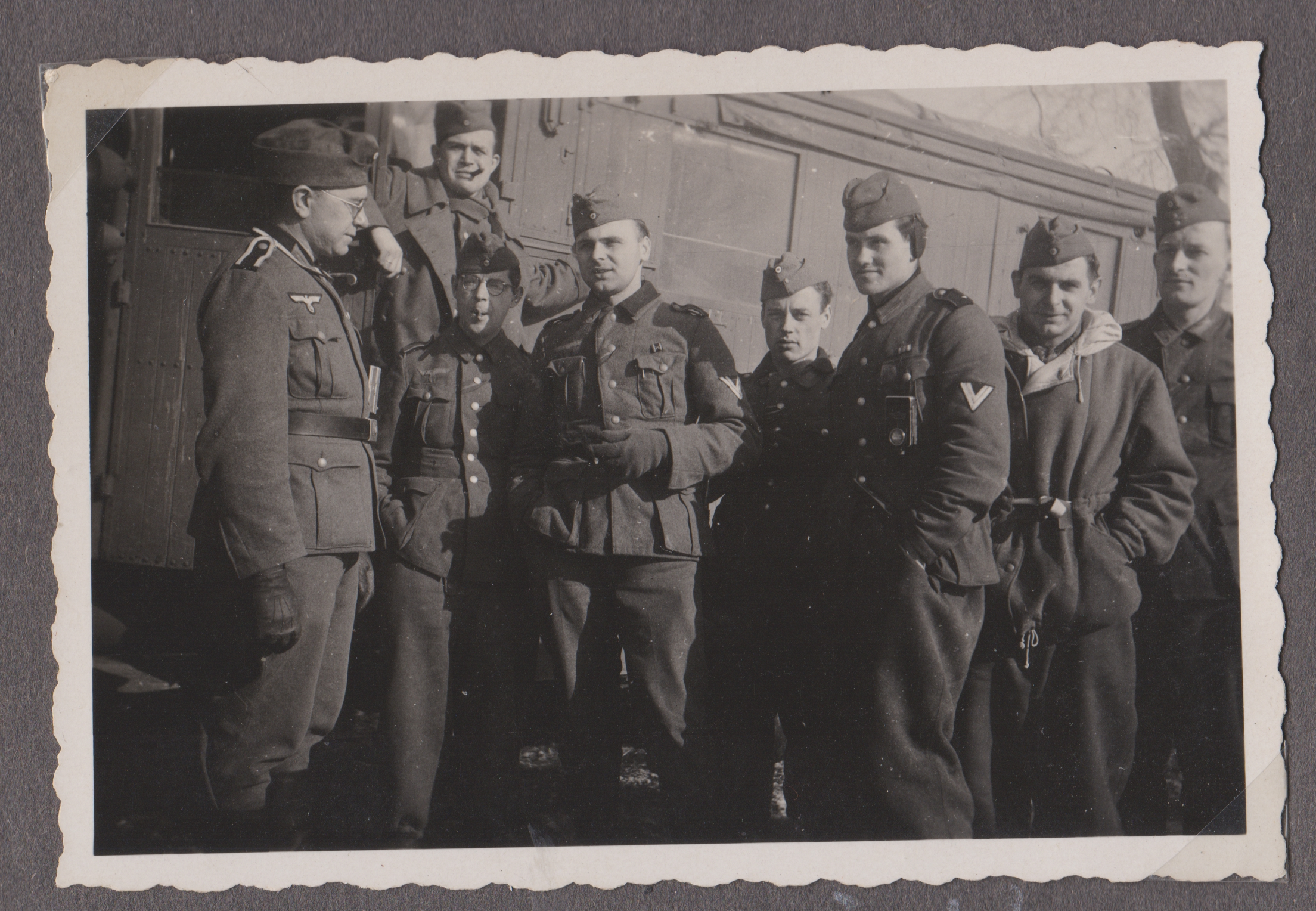
Nazi German soldiers in Konotop (February 1943).

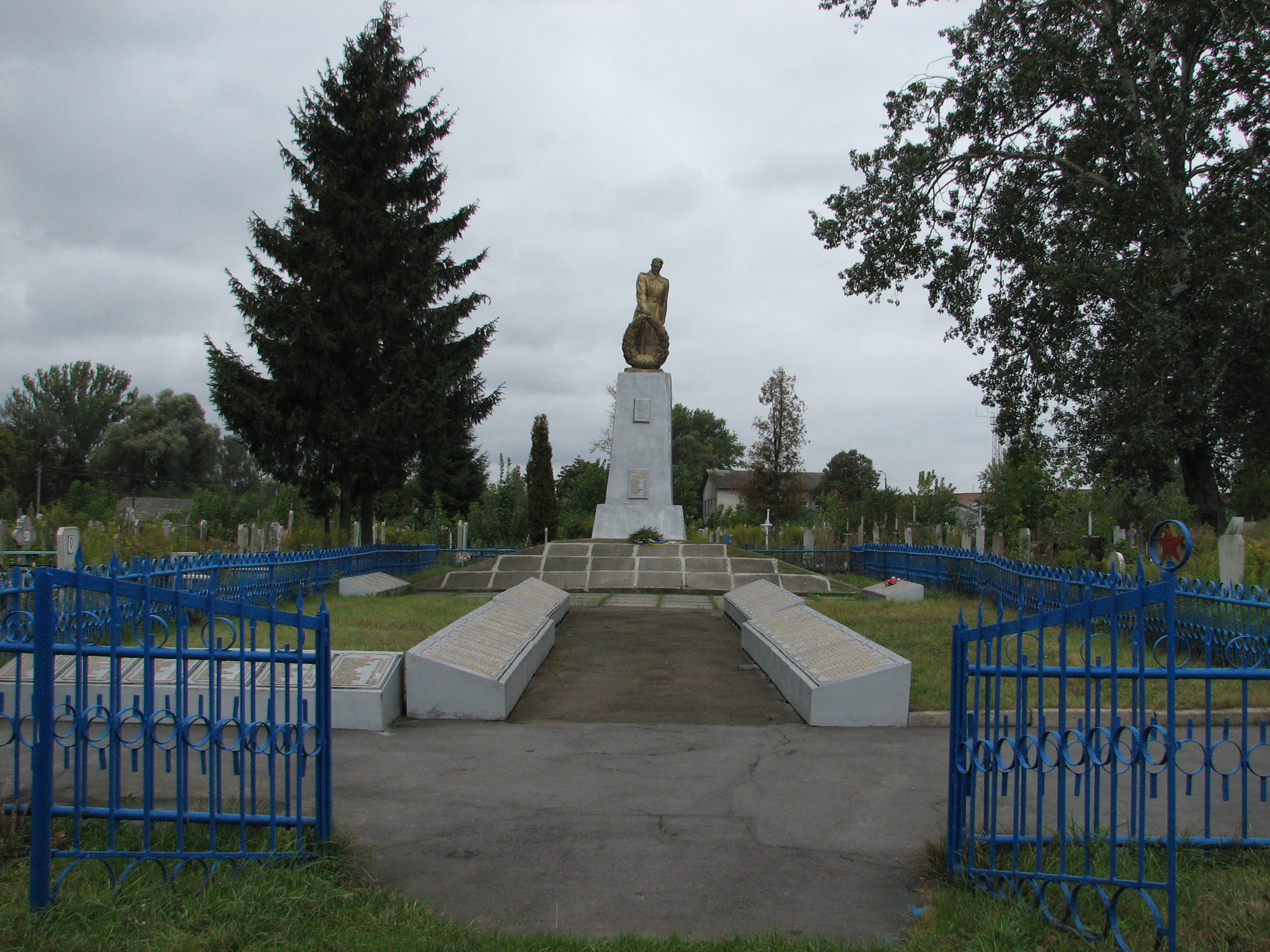
Mass grave of soldiers who died in the liberation of Konotop.

When Nazi Germany invaded the Soviet Union in 1941, Konotop quickly came under attack by September 1941. By early September, over 150 German tanks were near the Seym in the village of Melnia to cross into Konotop, and they were supported by aerial attacks by the Luftwaffe. At the time, the city was defended by the Soviet units of the 227th Rifle Division and the 5th Airborne Brigade of the 3rd Airborne Corps, which were led chiefly by Aleksandr Rodimtsev. Fighting around the city lasted from 3-7 September 1941, with volunteers using improved weapons from the factories also joining the fight. The Soviets withdrew from Konotop after heavy fighting on 7 September 1941, and from that time until 6 September 1943 the city remained under Nazi German control.

The Germans operated a Nazi prison in the city. The Stalag 310 prisoner-of-war camp was based in the city from July 1942 until May 1943, when it was moved to Zaporizhzhia. The former POW camp was located on what is now Brativ Radchenkiv and Voroshylova streets, and prisoners in the camp were largely held in the open, leading to many dying of the cold in addition to starvation. In 1943, Konotop was the location of the Stalag 384 POW camp and a subcamp of the Dulag 102 transit POW camp. Civilians also suffered during this time, with local figures accused of aiding the Soviets being transported into overcrowded cells and interrogated under torture, with many being executed also. Locations of mass executions primarily were at the brick factory, the cemeteries, and the ravines. At least one mass grave alone held 400 people who were shot on the night of 1-2 July 1942. It is estimated that as many as 30,000 people were killed in the city during the German occupation, of which 3,000 were civilians (1,000 of which were Jewish people), and 27,000 were Soviet POWs. Many who were not killed were also deported to Germany for labour. It is estimated that around 1,000 people in the city were deported.

Nevertheless, partisan underground activity against the Germans still operated within the city, and was first formed in December 1941. The partisan group was led by former Komsomol members, and they primarily transmitted intelligence on the German use of trains when they ran through the station, alongside secretly aiding the Soviet POWs in the camps. Another partisan group helped the POWs escape, although they would cease activities by early 1943.The largest partisan group in the city was formed in August 1941 under V.P. Kochemazov, although they would later join the much larger network under Sydir Kovpak to work across the Seym. Konotop was finally liberated by Soviet forces on 6 September 1943 during the 1st Ukrainian Front. The units involved were the 60th Army, 143rd Rifle Division, 280th Rifle Division, and 65th Guards Rifle Division. By order on 9 September 1943, the rifle divisions were all granted the honorific title of "Konotopski" for the liberation. After the war, the commission on war crimes in Konotop named the military commander of Konotop, Freerman, the head of the Gendarmerie, Pottak, a camp doctor, Weber, the camp commandant officer, Richter, the staff sergeant of the Gestapo, Weiss, and deputy head of the Gestapo, Mitskat, responsible for the deaths in the city. Details of the battle in September 1943 through a German soldier account are recounted in the book The Forgotten Soldier by Guy Sajer.

===== Holocaust =====
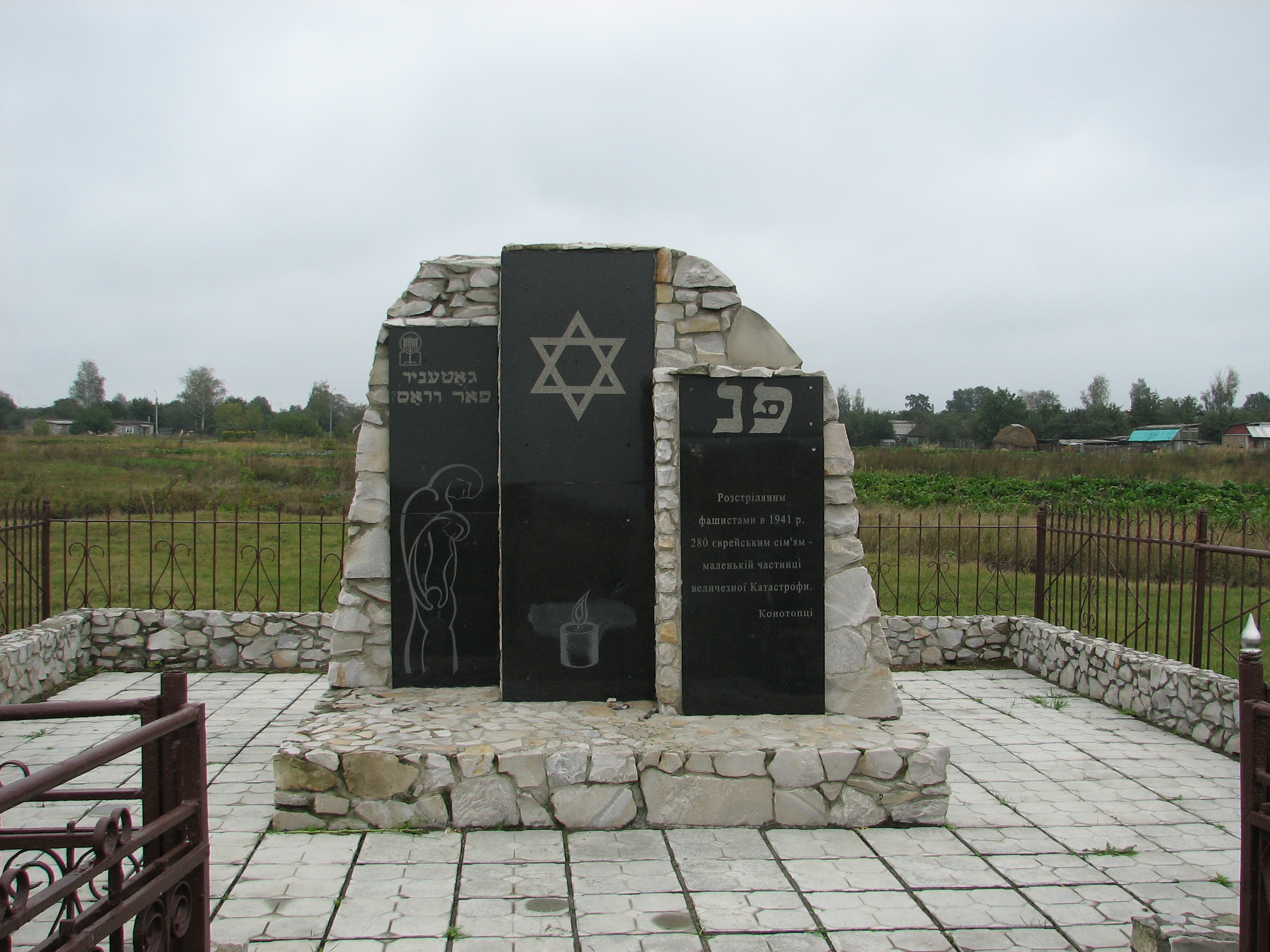
Memorial plaques to victims of the Holocaust. At this site is the memorial of the 3,000 civilians killed during the German occupation, of which a third were Jewish.

As part of the Holocaust, the Nazi Germans systematically massacred most of the Jewish population of Konotop during the occupation. After they took the city in September, the Germans ordered that all Jews in the city would have to register with the central office. Once they registered, they were forced to wear a Yellow badge marking that they were Jewish, and were forced into labour and publicly beaten. The Germans later told them to dress up and bring their valuables to an assembly point so that they could be "resettled", but instead they were all arrested. Around 280 families, which consisted of about 1,000 people, were arrested. The Jewish residents were then taken to the city's prison and later the POW camp, before being executed within the city, namely at the former Jewish cemetery. Neither the elderly people or children were spared, and many were shot on the night of 6-7 November 1941. In 1997, a memorial was unveiled in the city honouring the 1,000 Jewish people who were killed by the Germans during the occupation.

=== Post-war ===
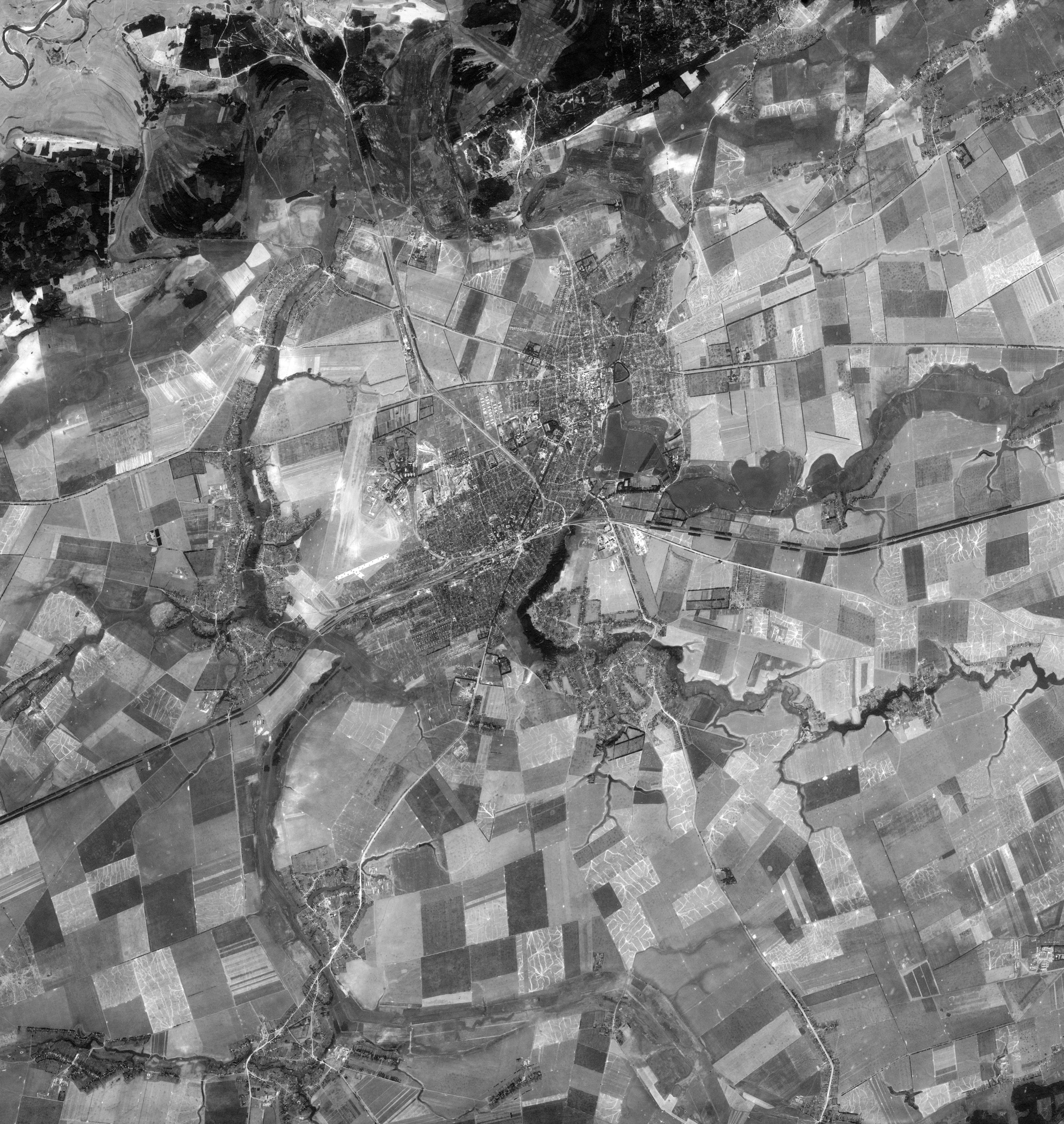
Satellite view of Konotop in 1966.

In the aftermath of the war, extensive reconstruction started, first on the railways that led to Konotop and then on the large enterprises in the city. Most of the reconstruction efforts were done with workers from the State Labour Reserves, although the workers faced a chronic shortage of living space (around just 1.4 square metres per person). With this, the population also rapidly grew from an estimated 45.9 thousand pre-war to 95.5 thousand by 1989. In the 1950s, there was an extensive effort to improve the cultural life in the city, which led to the opening up of the "Klitka" dance venue, alongside the start of the annual "Golden Puck" competitions in hockey and football. During the 1970s and 80s, this was extended by the major enterprises in the city. Chervonyi Metalist provided a new sanatorium, the Dubky recreation base, culture houses, and a sports school. The wagon repair plant built new Soviet-era apartment blocks alongside another culture house, and Motordetal built 363 apartments in the city.

=== Independent Ukraine ===
==== 2022 Russian invasion of Ukraine ====
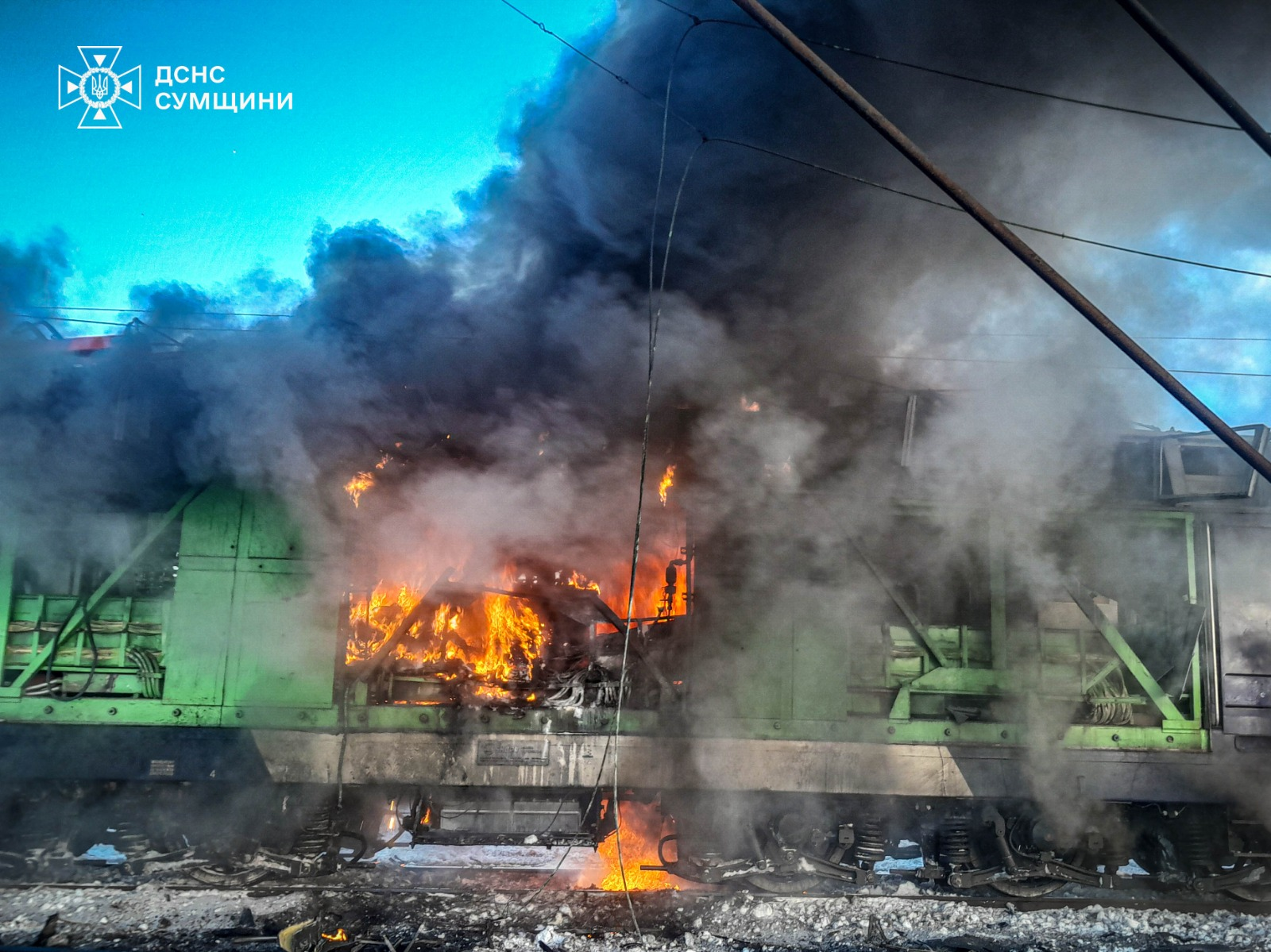
Train in Konotop struck by a Russian drone (February 2026).

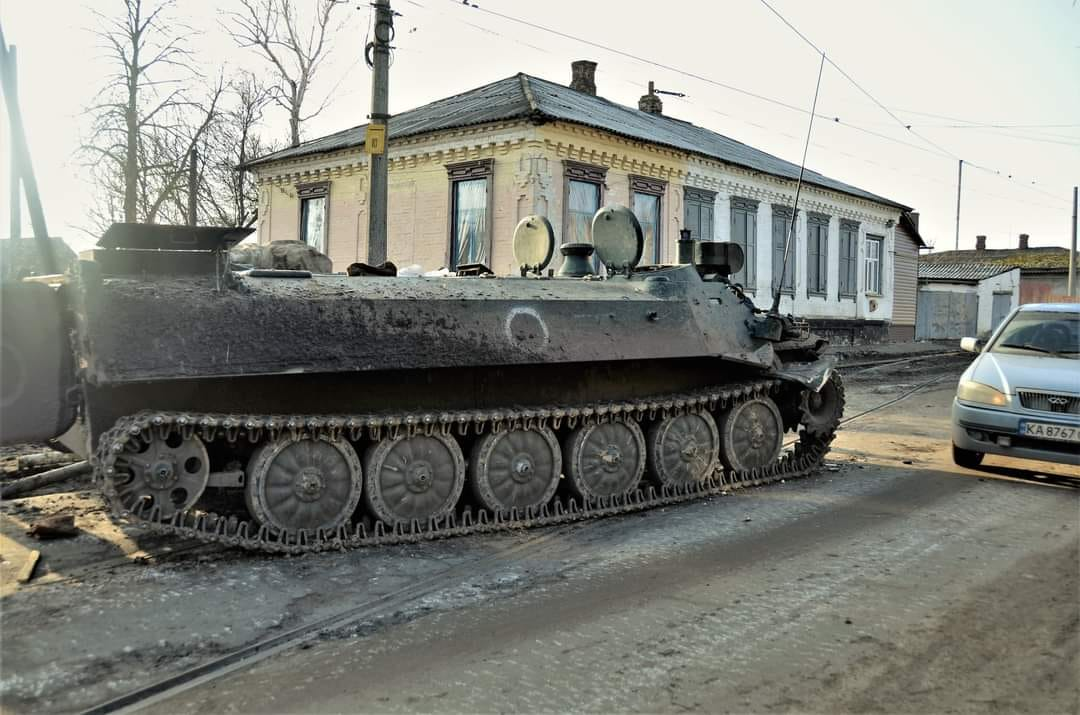
A destroyed Russian tank used in Konotop during the battle.

On 25 February 2022, during the 2022 Russian invasion of Ukraine, the city was reported to be under siege by Russian forces on their way to Kyiv. Some Ukrainian officials later reportedly claimed that the city had fallen, but according to sources published later, the Russian military failed in its attempt to take Konotop on 25 February. Mayor Artem Seminikhin stated on 2 March that Russian troops who had entered the city had warned him that they would destroy the city by shelling if the residents resisted them. Russian vehicles deployed outside the city council were surrounded by locals. Seminikhin asked the residents of the city whether they wanted to fight or surrender; the residents "overwhelmingly" refused to surrender. Later in the day, an agreement was reached under which Russian forces accepted not to change the city's government or deploy troops, in return for which the residents would not attack them. On 3 April, Ukrainian MP Oleksandr Kachura stated on Twitter that all Russian forces had left Konotop Raion. On 4 April 2022 Sumy Oblast's Governor Dmytro Zhyvytskyi stated that Russian troops no longer occupied any towns or villages in Sumy Oblast and had mostly withdrawn, while Ukrainian troops were working to push out the remaining units.

Since the retreat, the city has been the frequent target of Russian air strikes. The first massive strike to hit the city was in September 2024 using Shahed drones, which damaged an extensive amount of civilian infrastructure and injured 14. The number of strikes ramped up in 2026, with a strike in May killing one and injuring 11 others and another in June killing one person and injuring 7 others. Nevertheless, reconstruction and recovery efforts have been made as part of the Konotop Recovery and Development Office, which is part of the Recovery and Development Office NGO funded by UNDP and Sweden. In 2023, as part of the de-Russification campaign, the Konotop City Council renamed many of the streets in Konotop, about a fourth of them. However, some of the renamings were controversial, particularly the renaming of the historic Krasnohirska Street to Varshavska, since the renamings were done without the participation of residents.

== Geography ==
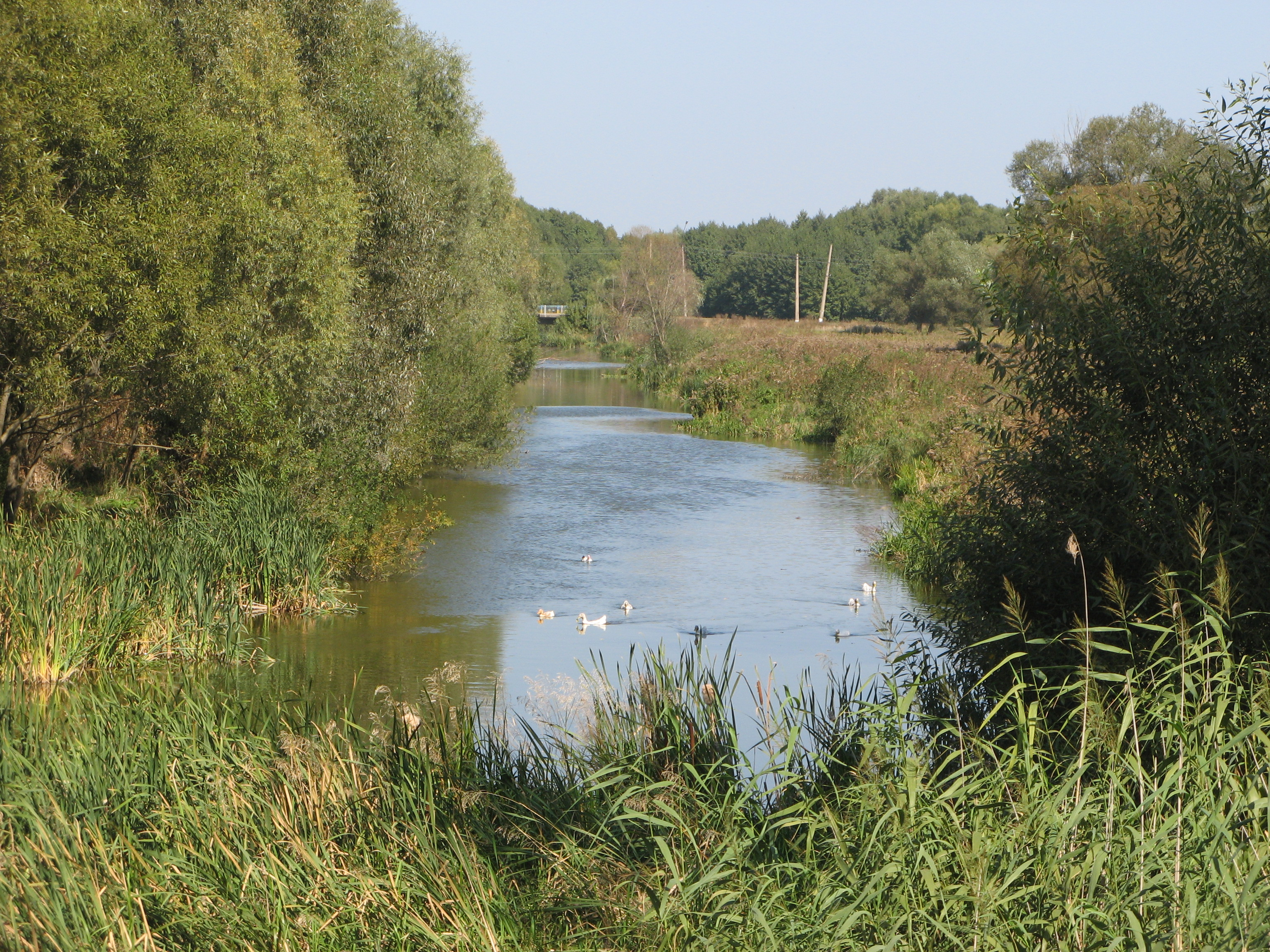
Yezuch in Konotop

The city is located in northeastern Ukraine within the Dnieper Lowland on the border of Polesia and the forest-steppe and on both banks of the Yezuch River, which flows into the Seim River 12 km north of the city. The Lypka River also flows through the city, and the Kukolka River flows nearby. There are several large dams on the rivers. The area of the city is 43.78 km².

Konotop belongs to the North Poltava highland region of the Left Bank-Dnieper forest-steppe province within Ukraine's forest-steppe zone. Geostructurally, Konotop is located on the northeastern slope of the Dnieper-Donetsk depression. The surface is a lowland loess plain which is flat, gently undulating, and dissected by passage valleys, ravines, and gullies. It is composed mainly of the Dnieper moraine, water-glacial sandy-loamy formations. Forest-steppe pine landscapes and upland landscapes prevail in combination with meadow-steppe lowlands. Paleogene rocks are represented by sands, sandstones, and marls. The cadastral score of the local soil is, on average, 64 points.

Konotop administratively borders Sadove Village in the northwest, with the village of Raky in the northeast, with the villages of Pidlypne and Pryvokzalne in the south, with the village of Popivka in the west.

=== Climate ===
Konotop has a warm-summer humid continental climate (Köppen Dfb). Sitting in the mid-latitudes, it is continental with moderate precipitation. More continental climates at the same latitude – such as Regina, Saskatchewan in Canada – have much colder winters than Konotop, suggesting that there is still significant moderation from the Atlantic Ocean.

Climate data for Konotop (1991–2020, extremes 1948–present)
| Month | Jan | Feb | Mar | Apr | May | Jun | Jul | Aug | Sep | Oct | Nov | Dec | Year |
|---|---|---|---|---|---|---|---|---|---|---|---|---|---|
| Record high °C (°F) | 10.4 (50.7) | 14.0 (57.2) | 22.5 (72.5) | 29.9 (85.8) | 33.1 (91.6) | 35.8 (96.4) | 35.9 (96.6) | 39.0 (102.2) | 35.0 (95.0) | 27.2 (81.0) | 18.0 (64.4) | 12.6 (54.7) | 39.0 (102.2) |
| Mean daily maximum °C (°F) | −2.1 (28.2) | −0.9 (30.4) | 5.0 (41.0) | 14.3 (57.7) | 21.0 (69.8) | 24.4 (75.9) | 26.4 (79.5) | 25.7 (78.3) | 19.4 (66.9) | 12.0 (53.6) | 4.0 (39.2) | −0.8 (30.6) | 12.4 (54.3) |
| Daily mean °C (°F) | −4.5 (23.9) | −3.8 (25.2) | 1.1 (34.0) | 9.1 (48.4) | 15.3 (59.5) | 19.0 (66.2) | 20.7 (69.3) | 19.6 (67.3) | 13.9 (57.0) | 7.5 (45.5) | 1.5 (34.7) | −2.9 (26.8) | 8.0 (46.4) |
| Mean daily minimum °C (°F) | −6.9 (19.6) | −6.6 (20.1) | −2.4 (27.7) | 4.3 (39.7) | 9.7 (49.5) | 13.7 (56.7) | 15.4 (59.7) | 13.9 (57.0) | 9.0 (48.2) | 3.8 (38.8) | −0.8 (30.6) | −5.1 (22.8) | 4.0 (39.2) |
| Record low °C (°F) | −32.9 (−27.2) | −32.2 (−26.0) | −26.1 (−15.0) | −12.2 (10.0) | −3.7 (25.3) | 2.8 (37.0) | 6.1 (43.0) | 3.8 (38.8) | −4.1 (24.6) | −9.2 (15.4) | −22.8 (−9.0) | −28.9 (−20.0) | −32.9 (−27.2) |
| Average precipitation mm (inches) | 46 (1.8) | 37 (1.5) | 37 (1.5) | 37 (1.5) | 59 (2.3) | 58 (2.3) | 71 (2.8) | 48 (1.9) | 47 (1.9) | 44 (1.7) | 42 (1.7) | 45 (1.8) | 571 (22.5) |
| Average extreme snow depth cm (inches) | 10 (3.9) | 13 (5.1) | 8 (3.1) | 0 (0) | 0 (0) | 0 (0) | 0 (0) | 0 (0) | 0 (0) | 0 (0) | 2 (0.8) | 6 (2.4) | 13 (5.1) |
| Average rainy days | 8 | 8 | 8 | 12 | 13 | 15 | 14 | 11 | 14 | 13 | 13 | 10 | 139 |
| Average snowy days | 19 | 17 | 11 | 2 | 0.1 | 0 | 0 | 0 | 0.1 | 2 | 10 | 18 | 79 |
| Average relative humidity (%) | 84.4 | 82.0 | 77.0 | 67.2 | 64.1 | 69.2 | 70.8 | 70.6 | 76.9 | 80.6 | 86.3 | 86.3 | 76.3 |
| Mean monthly sunshine hours | 42.5 | 69.1 | 139.9 | 190.6 | 283.2 | 272.6 | 288.8 | 267.1 | 170.0 | 110.1 | 40.6 | 30.5 | 1,905 |
Source 1: Pogoda.ru.net
Source 2: World Meteorological Organization (humidity and sun 1981–2010)

== Legal status and politics ==
=== Legal status ===
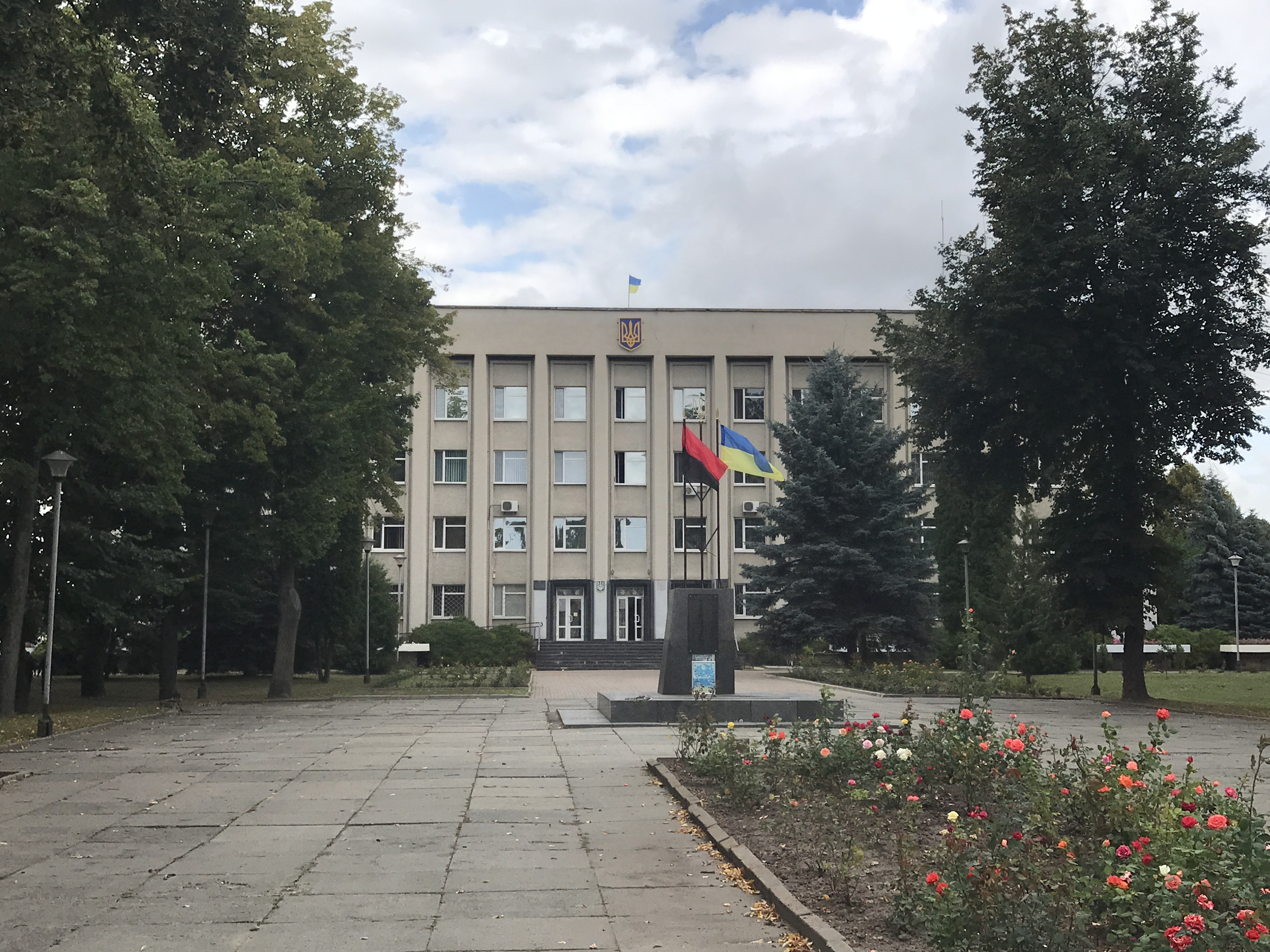
Konotop City Council

The city of Konotop is governed by the Konotop City Council, with the head of the city council being the mayor of the city, which as of 2026 is Artem Semenikhin of the Svoboda party. The city council, as of 2015, consists of 36 deputies. The mayor and the city council regularly meet together at the Konotop City Council building. Until 2020, Konotop was a city of regional significance; however, in July 2020, as part of administrative reform, Zelenskyy abolished this system and incorporated Konotop into the Konotop urban hromada. The city was also incorporated as the administrative seat of the Konotop Raion within Sumy Oblast.

=== Politics ===
After Ukrainian independence, like most of Sumy Oblast, the city's voters have generally favoured the proponents of pro-Europeanism, namely first the Our Ukraine Bloc, Batkivshchyna, and more recently Servant of the People. This is most evident in the local elections. In the 2015 Ukrainian local elections, of the 36 seats in the city council, 8 were won the Ukrainian nationalist party Svoboda, 6 by Petro Poroshenko's pro-European European Solidarity party, 5 by the agrarian People's party, and then the rest by either Batkivshchyna, People's Will, Ridne Misto, UKROP, or Self Reliance. No pro-Russian party, such as the Opposition Bloc, won a single seat in the council. The mayor of the city since 2015, Artem Semenikhin, is also a member of the Svoboda party. He was briefly removed in 2018 after a vote of no confidence before being reinstated in July 2019. He is known for his Ukrainian nationalist views, including in June 2020 when he burned the Russian flag in front of the Russian embassy in Kyiv and replacing a portrait of the Ukrainian president Petro Poroshenko in November 2015 with Stepan Bandera.

== Demographics ==
=== Population ===
Historical population

| Year | Pop. | ±% |
|---|---|---|
| 1897 | 18,770 | — |
| 1923 | 28,803 | +53.5% |
| 1926 | 33,192 | +15.2% |
| 1939 | 45,872 | +38.2% |
| 1959 | 54,097 | +17.9% |
| 1970 | 68,400 | +26.4% |

| Year | Pop. | ±% |
|---|---|---|
| 1979 | 82,278 | +20.3% |
| 1989 | 95,549 | +16.1% |
| 1992 | 99,200 | +3.8% |
| 2001 | 93,365 | −5.9% |
| 2014 | 88,477 | −5.2% |
| 2022 | 83,543 | −5.6% |

According to the 2001 All-Ukrainian Census, the only official nationwide post-independence census done in Ukraine, the population of Konotop in 2001 was 93,365. The most recent estimate was done by the State Statistics Service of Ukraine in 2022, which estimated that the total population in the city was 83,543. After the population steadily grew from the 18,770 figure first recorded in the 1897 census, the population reached a peak in 1992, just a year after independence, of 99,200, with the population never crossing the 100,000 mark. The number of people in the city has continued to decline since then.

==== Ethnicity ====
| Ethnic group | 1939 | 2001 |
|---|---|---|
| Ukrainians | 76.53% | 90.05% |
| Russians | 13.40% | 8.31% |
| Jews | 8.59% | 0.24% |
| Belarusians | N/A | 0.38% |

In the 2001 All-Ukrainian Census, the population was almost monolithically Ukrainian, at 90.05%. There was also a small minority of Russians at 8.31%, and lesser among of both Belarusians and Ashkenazi Jews. In the earlier census that measured demographics, the 1939 census, this was also very similar. Ukrainians made up the vast majority at 76.53%, although both Russians and Jews had higher percentages at 13.40% and 8.59%, respectively. At the time, there was not a significant Belarusian population yet. The exact ethnic composition according to the 2001 census was as follows:

Ethnic groups in Konotop
| | percent |
| Ukrainians | 90.05% |
| Russians | 8.31% |
| Belarusians | 0.38% |
| Ashkenazi Jews | 0.24% |
| Gypsies | 0.20% |
| others | 0.82% |

=== Language ===
According to the 2001 All-Ukrainian Census, Konotop's majority population had a mother tongue of Ukrainian as their native language (85.9%), with a minority speaking Russian as their mother tongue (13.5%). There was also a very small number of people who spoke the Belarusian. The exact linguistic composition in 2001 was as follows:

Native languages in Konotop
| | percent |
| Ukrainian | 85.9% |
| Russian | 13.5% |
| Belarusian | 0.1% |
| others | 0.2% |

== Media ==
=== Newspapers ===
The city's main newspaper historically has been Konotop Region, which was founded in 1917 as a Russian-language newspaper. The newspaper ceased activities during World War II, before resuming and publishing in Ukrainian, covering socio-economic, political, and civic affairs. In April 2016, government bodies were required to withdraw from the newspaper, which the newspaper approved of. However, this wasn't completed by the December 2018 deadline, which made it so that the paper's license was invalid as a government-controlled newspaper. Due to never completing the required law, publications ceased in January 2019. The editor of the paper said that they had chosen to do so also because the paper had not been sustainable with declining circulation, and that other examples of newspapers that complied with the law struggled financially.

Since then, the main newspaper has been Konotop.City, which first started publishing in October 2018. It covers local news and lifestyles, and was published with the support of the Media Development Foundation "Або".

=== Radio ===
Konotop has seven radio stations on the FM band. Since June 2022, all broadcasting of Russian-language music content on radio stations in public spaces has been banned by the city council:

- Radio NV (100.7 MHz), a national talk show and news broadcaster. The station was in use as "Radio ERA FM" starting in 2009, before becoming Radio NV in 2018 after Dragon Capital acquired its license.
- HIT FM (101.1 MHz), a music broadcasting station. It was previously assigned to Hromada from 2018-19, although Hromada never used it. HIT FM started using the station in late December 2021.
- First Konotop Radio (103.9 MHz), a local music station. It has used this station since 1998, when it was known as "Radio-Kon" before becoming First Konotop Radio in 2010.
- Ukrainian Radio/Ukrainian Radio Sumy (104.6 MHz), the national public broadcaster. It has used this station since 1 February 2015, although since 2022 it has switched to partly doing marathons called "United News" entirely about the war. Ukrainian Radio Sumy also sometimes airs on limited hours using this station, and is entirely about Sumy Oblast, starting as a test mode in 2010 known as "Sloboda-FM".
- Express Radio (106.2 MHz), a local commercial music station. It has been broadcasting in Konotop since October 2009.
- Radio Relax (107.1 MHz), an easy-listening music station. It has been broadcasting in Konotop since the autumn of 2004, originally as "VRM Melodiya," then "Perets FM" and finally Relax Radio, starting in November 2011.

=== Television ===
No television is transmitted locally; all come via a station in Tynytsia near Bakhmach and also at Shostka. The first multiplex carries the main channels of Ukraine that are broadcast nationwide, such as Suspilne, 1+1, and Inter. The second multiplex, which is channel 49, carries Novyi Kanal, 2+2, and NTN among others. The third multiplex, which is channel 43, carries more regional broadcasters like K1, K2, and Enter-Film. It used to have other channels like Priamyi nd Espreso TV, although they went off air in 2022 on the station. The fifth multiplex, which is channel 51, carried regional Suspilne stations such as those for Chernihiv and Sumy alongside Army TV. The seventh multiplex, which is channel 5, is the only one of DVB-T2 standards and carries cultural and sports broadcasters such as Svit+. There are two historically local broadcasters also, TRK "Vezha" and "Kon-Takt". Kon-Takt is a children's television channel. They have been airing since at least the mid-2000s.

== Religion ==
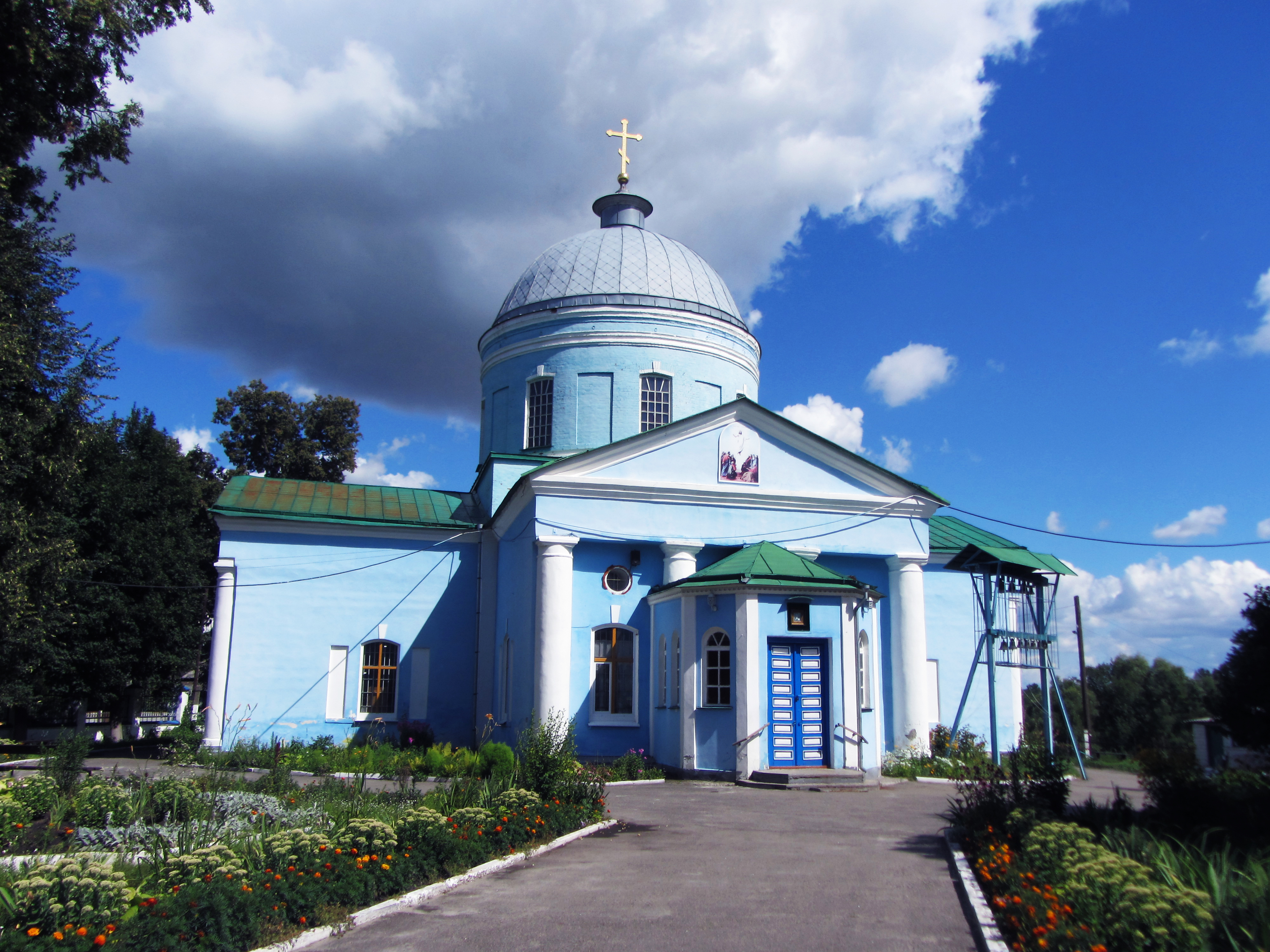
Ascension Cathedral

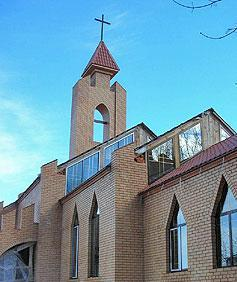
Our Lady of Fatima

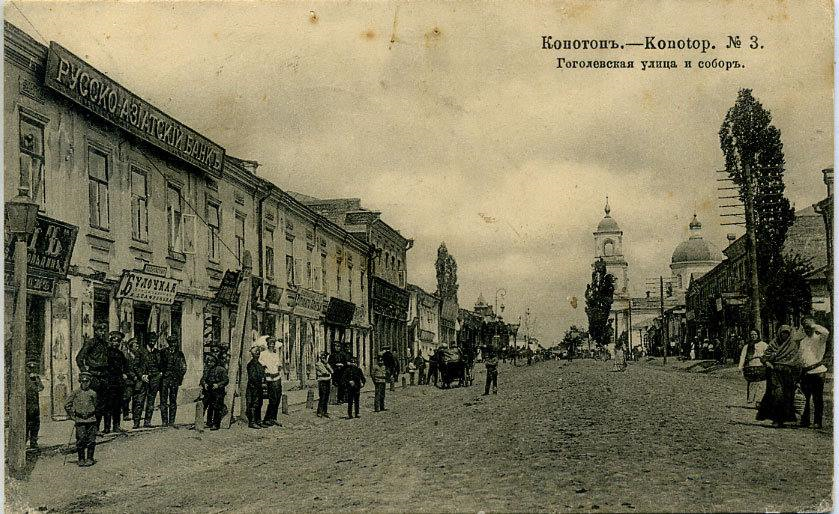
Cathedral of the Blessed Virgin Mary

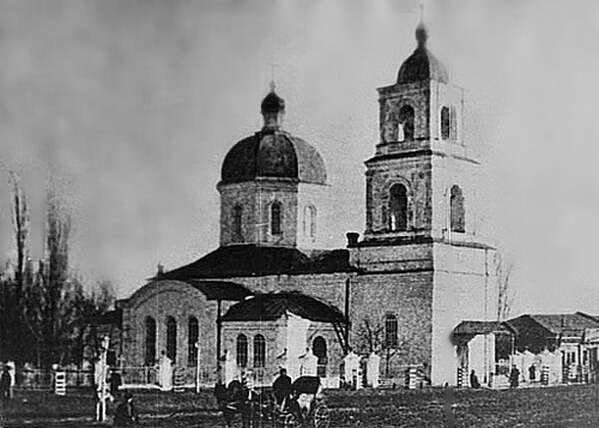
Cathedral of the Nativity of the Virgin

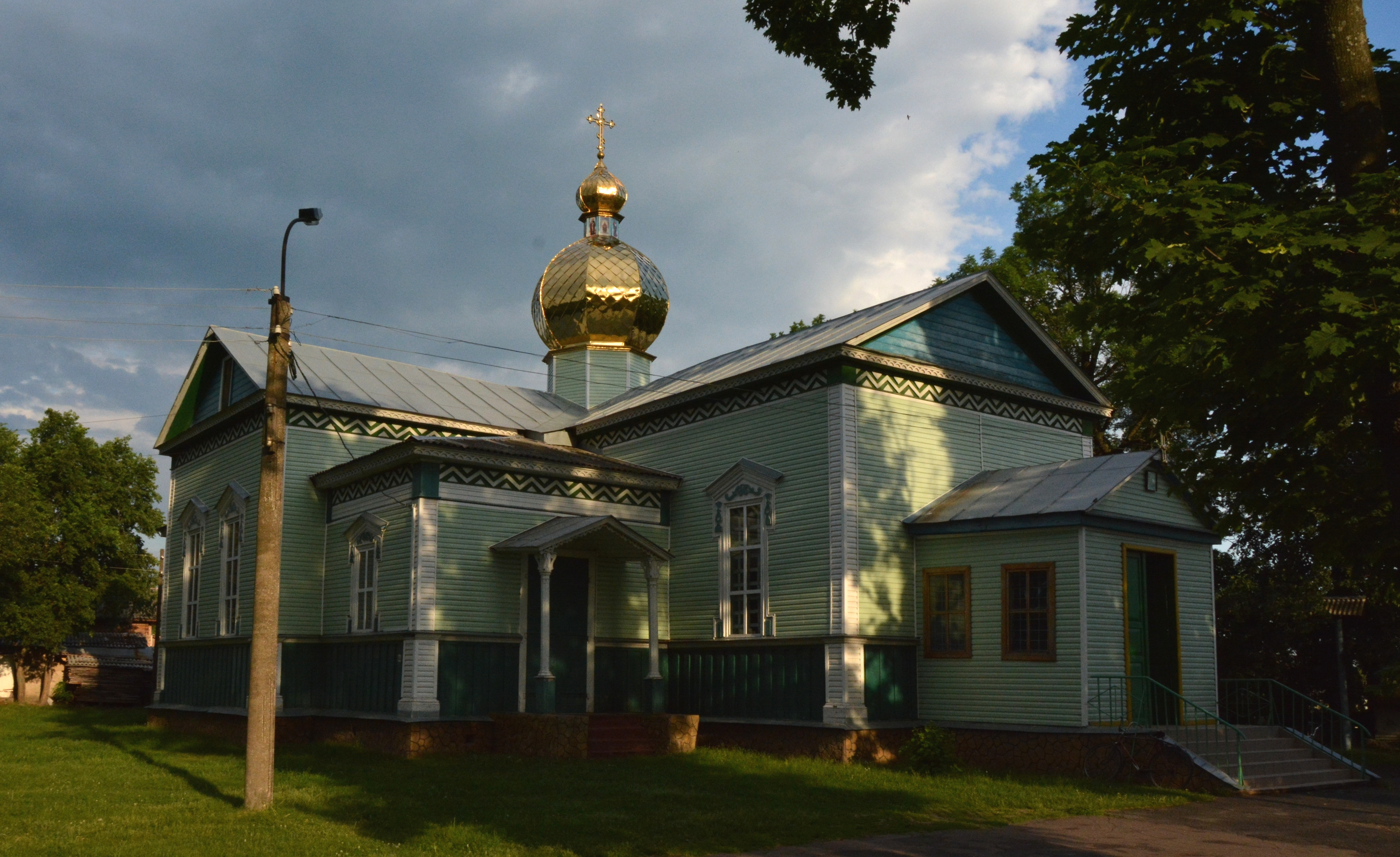
Saint Nicholas Church

Konotop's residents belong to the religious traditions of the Ukrainian Orthodox Church – Kyiv Patriarchate, Ukrainian Orthodox Church - Moscow Patriarchate, Roman Catholic Church, and historically Judaism. There are also smaller communities of Protestants such as Baptists, Seventh-day Adventists, and Jehovah's Witnesses.

Originally, most of the city's inhabitants belonged to the Moscow Patriarchate, although after 2019, with the granting of autocephaly for the Kyiv Patriarchate, many switched. The oldest and most significant Orthodox Church is the Ascension Church, which was built between 1824 and 1846. Another historic Orthodox church is the St. Nicholas Church, which is wooden and was constructed in 1891. It was restored after the Soviet era, and joined the KP early, at least by 2011. Another KP church was consecrated by Filaret Denysenko in September 2011, which was a cathedral dedicated to the Nativity of the Theotokos. On 3 May 2022, the mayor of Konotop issued an order that banned all MP activity within the city, stating that the eparchy was acting on orders of the FSB and a threat to national security. The UOC-MP's Metropolitan of Konotop and Hlukhiv later fled to Russia following the order, leading the new metropolitan to be Roman (Kymovych). In terms of Roman Catholicism, there is one parish, which is dedicated to Our Lady of Fatima and served by Franciscan friars as part of the Sumy deanery of the Kharkiv-Zaporizhzhia diocese. The city is thought to have had a historic presence of Roman Catholicism when it was Polish, but the modern-day movement came from migrants of western Ukraine who started construction on the church in May 2000, opening it up fully in 2005 under Stanislaw Padewski. Funding for the church came from parishioners in Colorado Springs, particularly from Jeff Woolsey.

The city has historically also has a Jewish community, comprising at its peak 23.5% of the population in 1897, most of whom came from the Pale of Settlement. During the early 1900s, there were three synagogues in the city, although they were also discriminated against by pogroms in 1881 and 1919. By 1939, Jewish people composed 8.6% of the city's population (3,941), although they were heavily discriminated against by Soviet authorities as part of the official atheistic practice. The Holocaust by occupying Nazi German forces killed 1,000 of the Jews residing in the city, decimating most of its population. After this, the Jewishh population in the city continued to decline, although in 1995 the community was formally registered again in the city. The city council later provided a building for the community due to the only surviving synagogue on Yarkovska Street being repurposed by the city.

== Culture ==
=== Attractions ===
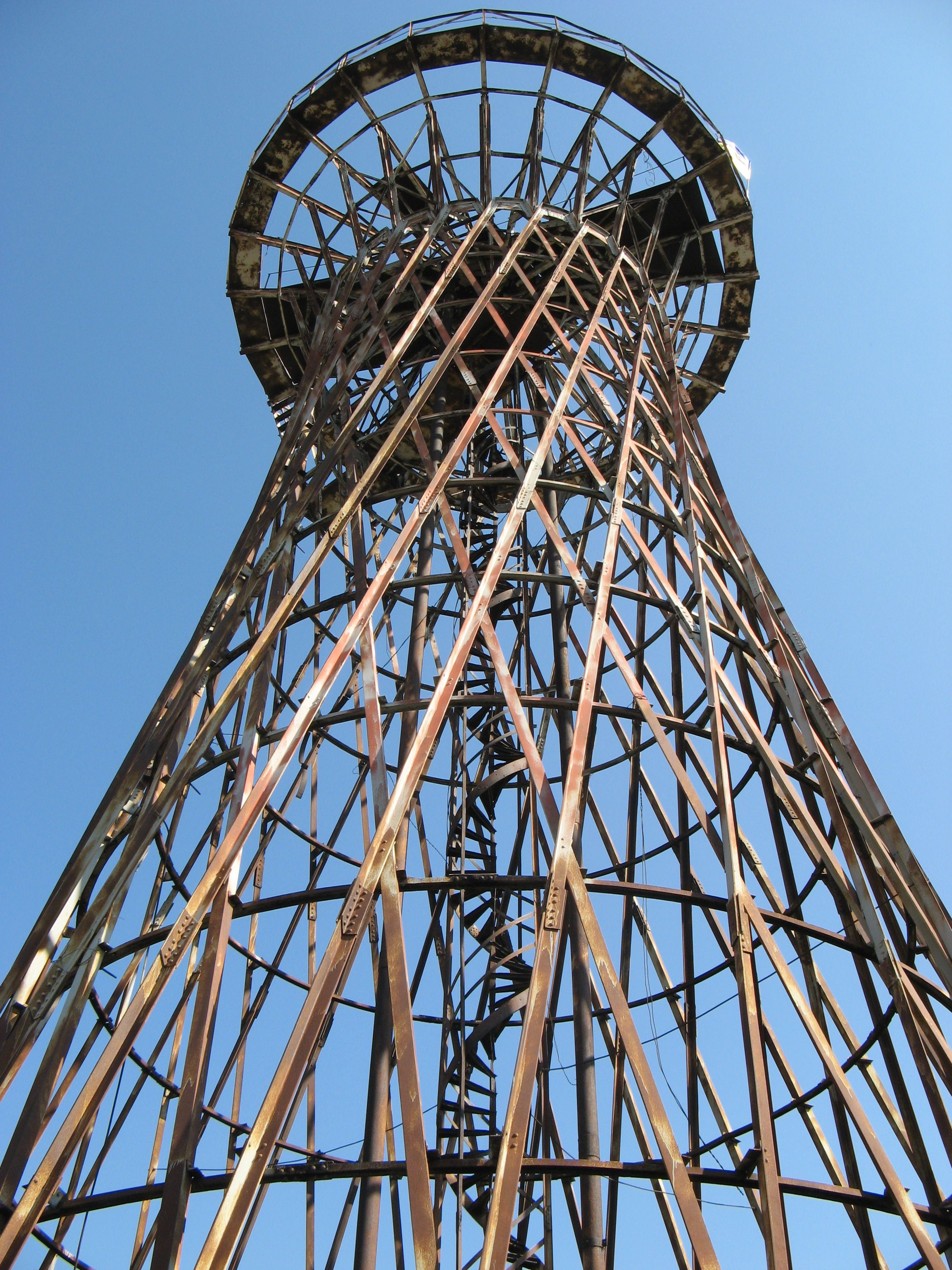
Shukhov Water Tower

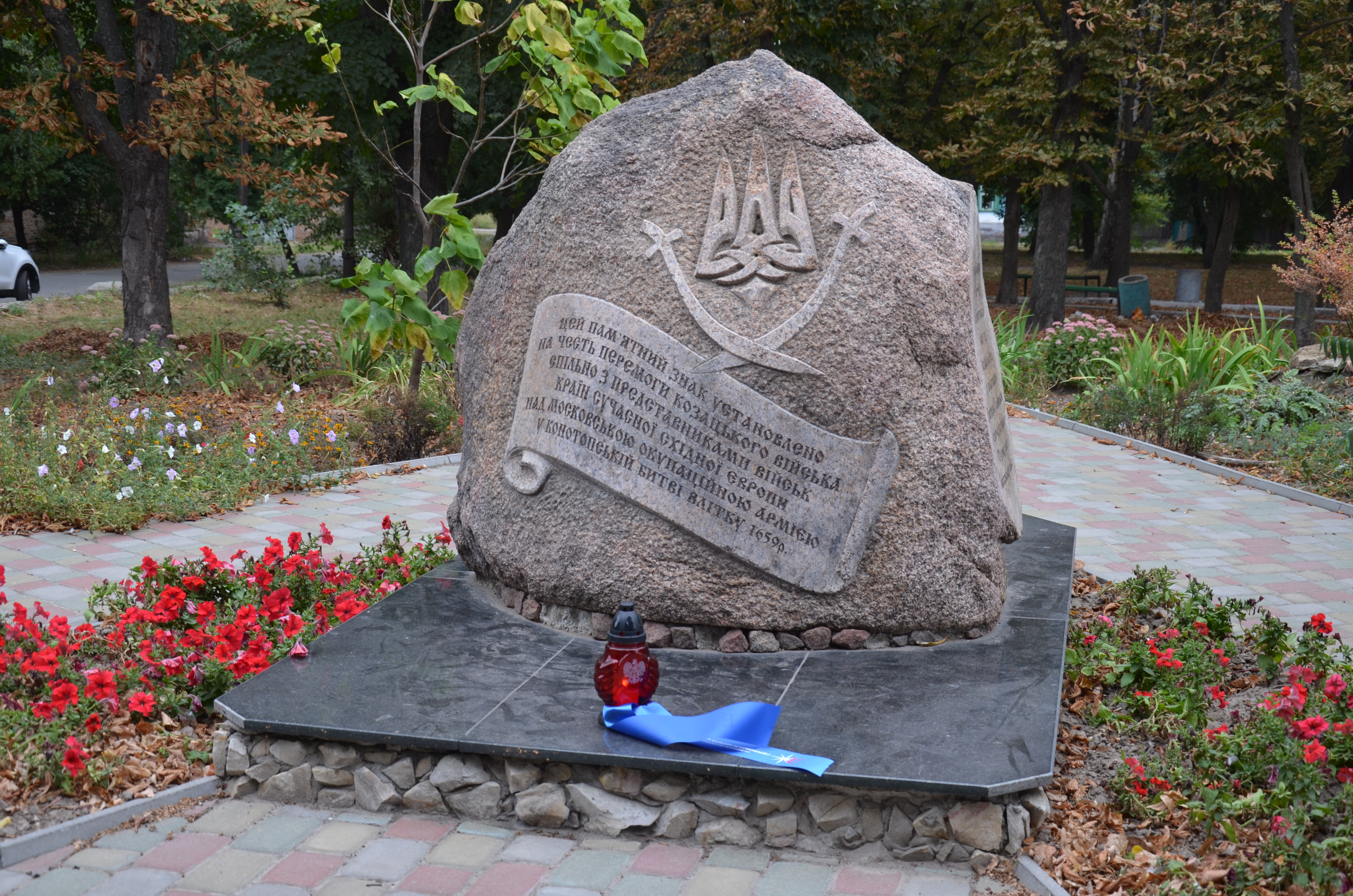
Monument to the Battle of Konotop (1659).

Within the city center of Konotop is the current railway station building, built in 1953 by Petro Krasytskyi. Opposite it is a House of Culture that was built in 1927 in constructivist style alongside a former hospital complex built in the 1890s that has been used as a local filming area. At the corner of Klubna and Uspensko-Troitska streets is a monument to the Konotop tram network, which consists of a former KTM-5 tram car that seated 35 people, which was unveiled in June 2004. Nearby at the corner of Divisions Square and Urytskoho Street is the Shukhov water tower, which was designed by Vladimir Shukhov in 1928-29 and is a hyperboloid tower, similar to other ones he designed in the USSR such as the Shukhov Tower in Moscow and the Shukhov Tower on the Oka River near Dzerzhinsk. It is now considered a landmark of engineering regionally, and has also been used previously as an air-defense observation post until 1941.

On Konotop Boulevard is a sculpture of a horse, which was built in 2008. It commemorates one of the versions of the city's name, that is, that the Tatars drowned in the area's marshes, giving rise to the name "where horses sink". After being damaged, it was restored by a local sculptor, Yuriy Vedmid. At the former location of Konotop Fortress's ramparts is a park for victims of the Soviet-Afghan War, some of the older school buildings, and the building where Kazimir Malevich is first reported to have sold one of his paintings while living in the city. Nearby is a monument to Malevich himself, which was commissioned on the anniversary of his famous painting Black Square. It was originally located at a cafe before being relocated to the House of Trade in 2015. Within Cathedral Square, one of the older areas of the city, are two monuments dedicated to Taras Shevchenko, one built in 1939 and another in 1993. Opposite this is a prison built in 1820, one of the oldest still-standing structures in the city, and some of the older churches.

In commemoration of the Battle of Konotop, there are multiple monuments in the city. One was built in 2009 for the 350th anniversary, known as "Sabers," and another in 2015, which is a memorial stone honouring the siege and is located at the former site of the fortress's walls. There are also monuments of the Cossack who led the battle, Hryhoriy Hulyanytsky, such as a bust designed by Yuliya Rososhanska at the former School No. 7. Other war memorials include the complex dedicated to the 27,000 Soviet prisoners of war executed in Konotop, the 1,716 soldiers from Konotop killed in the war, and the 3,000 civilians killed in Konotop during the war. There has also been a proposal for the easternmost Stepan Bandera monument on Bandery Street, which was coordinated between Konotop and Ivano-Frankivsk's mayors.

==== Witch of Konotop ====
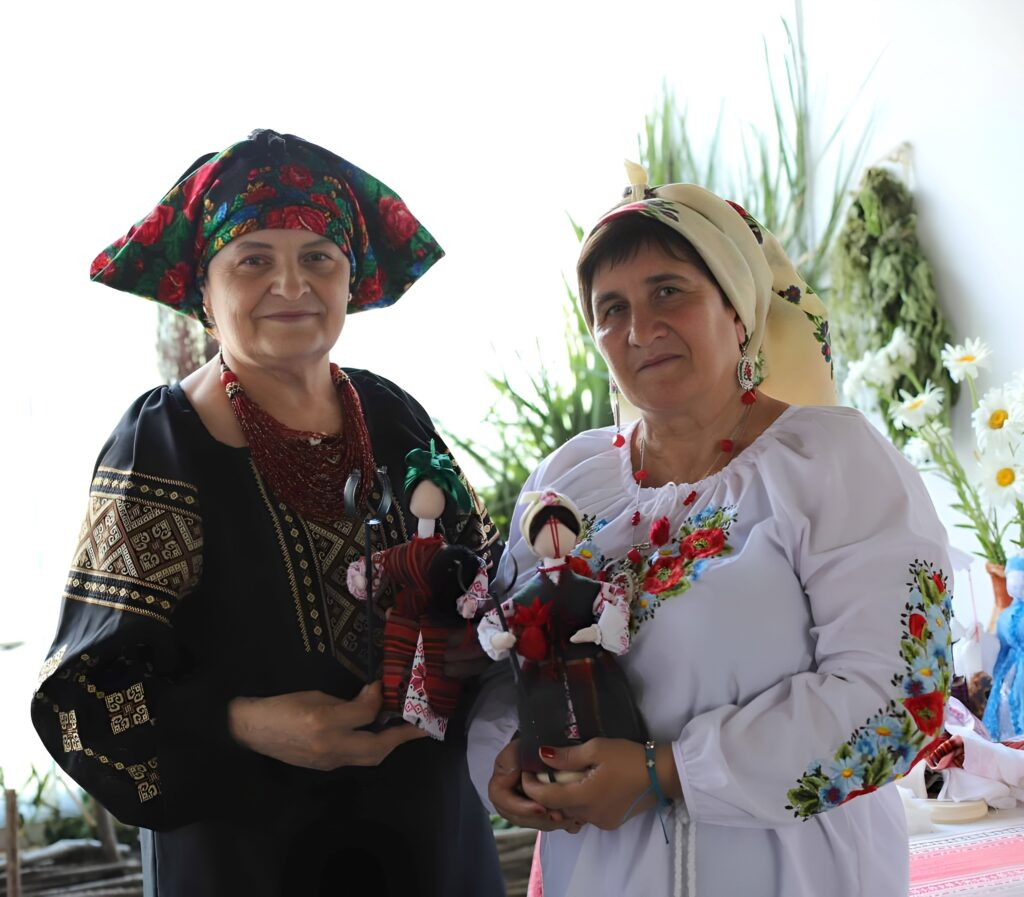
Culture of storytelling about the Witch of Konotop

Konotop is well known culturally both nationally and internationally for its association with the witches of Konotop, which has been included on the National Register of Elements of the Intangible Cultural Heritage of Ukraine since 2025. The association is believed to come from the 1833 satirical novella The Witch of Konotop by Hryhorii Kvitka-Osnovianenko in his second book of Little Russian Stories. In the book, a company scribe, Prokip Pistriak, and captain Mykyta Zabriokha attempt to root out witches in Konotop, leading to a witch hunt that kills many people. Since then, the work has been adapted many times. The first time was in 1982 with a screenplay performed at the Ivan Franko National Academic Drama Theater, which was adapted into a film in 1987 by Ukrtelefilm. Another musical-comedy film premiered based on the story in 1990, produced by Dovzhenko Film Studio, although it significantly changed the plot of the novella.

The novella resurged into prominence in 2022, when a video went viral in 2022 of a woman in Konotop during the battle in the city warning a Russian soldier on a tank that every second woman in Konotop was a witch, and he would be cursed in reference to the story. This led to a new theatre adaptation, The Witch of Konotop, which was again directed by the Ivan Franko National Academic Drama Theatre. The resulting play went viral on TikTok, and although based on the novella also hints at the ongoing 2022 Russian invasion of Ukraine through Muscovy. In 2024, the play was adapted into a new horror film by Film.UA, which starred actress Tetiana Malkova and is also interpreted in the context of the Russian invasion. It was released in August 2024, and also had a soundtrack by Zlata Ognevich.

=== Museums ===
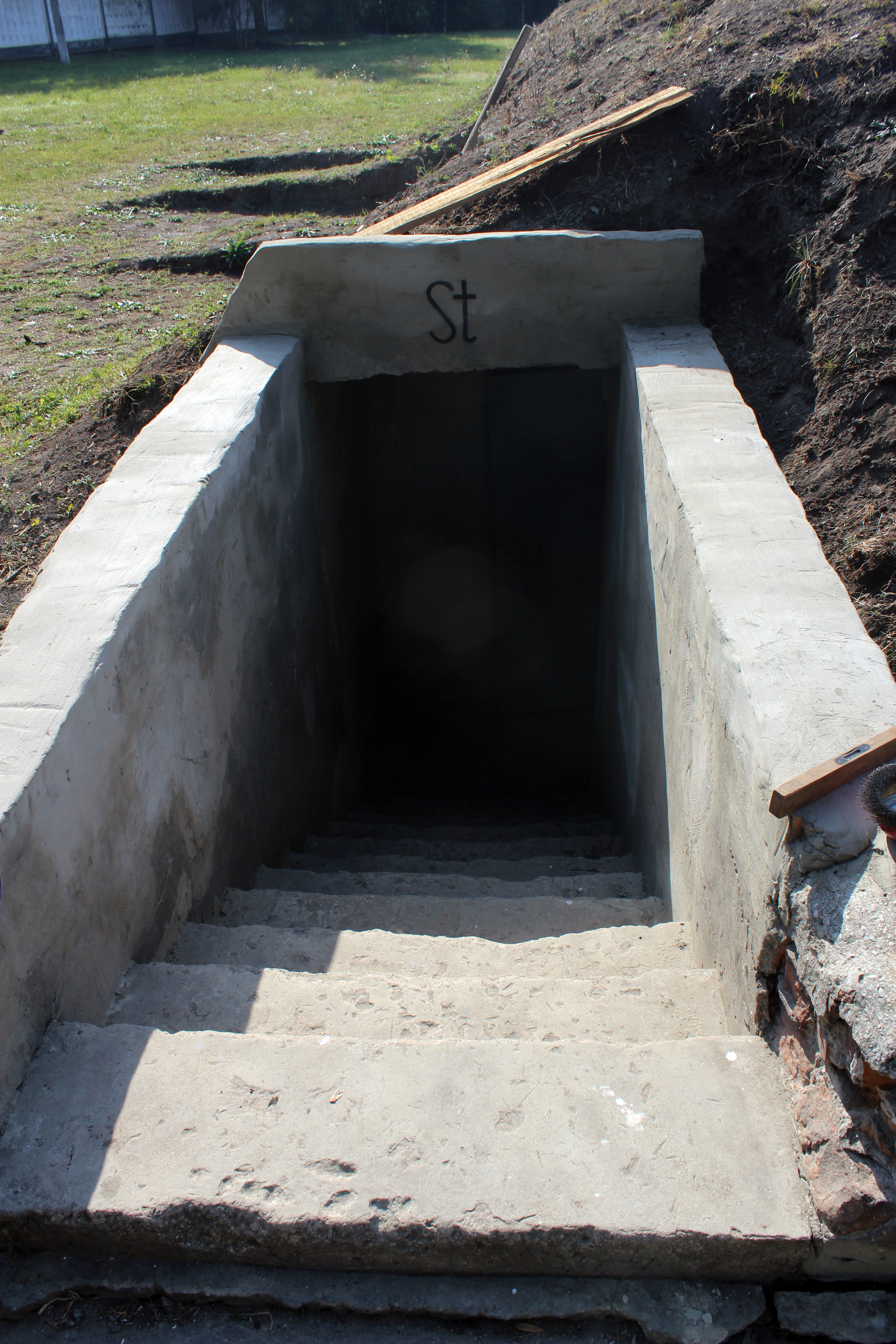
Nazi German bunker on the territory of the Konotop Aviation Museum.

Konotop is home to three main museums: the O. M. Lazarevsky Konotop Regional Studies Museum, the Dragomirov Estate Museum, and the Konotop Aviation Museum. The regional studies museum was opened up in 1900 and named after local historian Oleksandr Lazarevsky as one of the earliest local lore museums. After Lazarevsky died in 1902, the museum only resumed activities in 1920 after residents brought in looted items from the nobles in the city after the Russian Civil War. In 1934, it became a regional-studies institution, although it was then extensively looted by the Nazi Germany, which led to the designation being halted until 1950. As of 2020, the museum holds nearly 26,000 items across 10 halls, with notable holdings including the chair of Kirill Razumovsky, a gospel from 1708, Cossack weapons used during Khmelnytsky's uprising, and items from Taras Shevchenko, Petro Prokopovych, and Vasily Kochubey.

The regional museum administers the other two museums. The Dragomirov Estate Museum was opened in 2007 on the restored house where Mikhail Dragomirov lived from 1903 to 1905, which in 2020 was proposed as one of ten priority sites in Sumy Oblast for heritage revitalisation. The Aviation Museum was opened in September 2008, initially comprising mostly Mil-family helicopters, including ones donated by the enterprise Aviakon. Aviakon also later donated gunships and one of three Mil Mi-24A's that are displayed in museums in Ukraine. Motor Sich also donated aviation engines. In 2019, a Nazi German-era bunker was discovered on the site of the museum, dated to 1943, which was restored and put on display alongside Nazi German military equipment left from the era and materials about the occupation and battles.

=== Sports ===
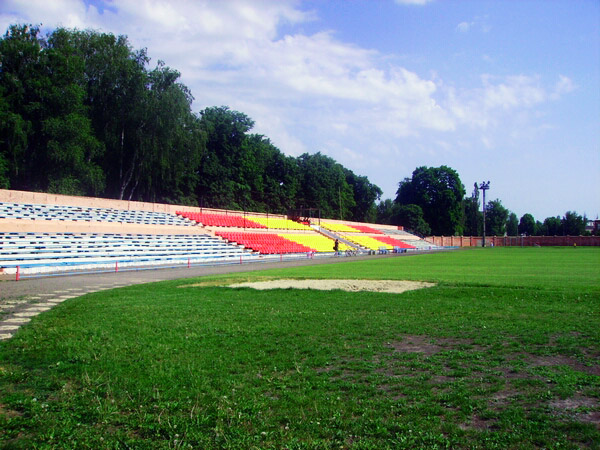
Yunist Stadium

Konotop is the home to FC Shakhtar Konotop, which competes in the Sumy Oblast Football Championship. Shakhtar was founded in 1953 and sponsored by Chervonyi Metalist, winning its first oblast championship in 1968. The club would then go dormant and be dissolved for many decades until 2000, when it was decided to revive the team. After it was revived, it went on to win the championship six more times, the last time being in 2012, alongside winning the oblast cup and Mykhailo Fomenko Super Cup (also an oblast-wide championship). Other football clubs that have since ceased to exist that played in Konotop were Lokomotiv Konotop, Zirka Konotop, Avanhard Konotop (which won the 1960 oblast championship), and Slovianets Konotop (which only competed for a season in 1997-98).

The most famous stadium in the city, which is used as the home ground for the football clubs, is Yunist Stadium. In 2017, the stadium was entirely reconstructed by DPTP Sumbudproekt, increasing the seating to 922.

=== City symbols ===
==== Coat of arms ====
A coat of arms of the city is believed to have existed since the 17th century, which was then described as a scarlet field with a golden cross, a golden six-pointed star, and a silver crescent. An official one was adopted in 1782, which described a red field, a golden cross, a silver horned moon, and a hexagonal star on top. The coat of arms was revised unofficially again in 1865, which depicted a scarlet shield with a Cross pattée in the middle, accompanied by 4 golden stars, each with 6 rays, an inverted silver crescent, and the coat of arms of the Chernihiv Governorate. There was also a silver crown on top with a ribbon of corn. The modern coat of arms was approved in April 2001 and is based on the 1782 design, and consists of a red field with a golden cross, a six-pointed star in silver, and a silver crescent. The red colour is used as a symbol of blood and courage, the silver crescent as a victory over the Tatar-Muslims from 1659, and the six-pointed star symbolises eternity.

==== Flag ====
The flag of Konotop was approved together with the coat of arms, and consists of a yellow-backgrounded rectangle with an aspect ratio of 2:3 with the coat of arms in the middle.

Coat of arms of Konotop

Flag of Konotop

== Economy ==
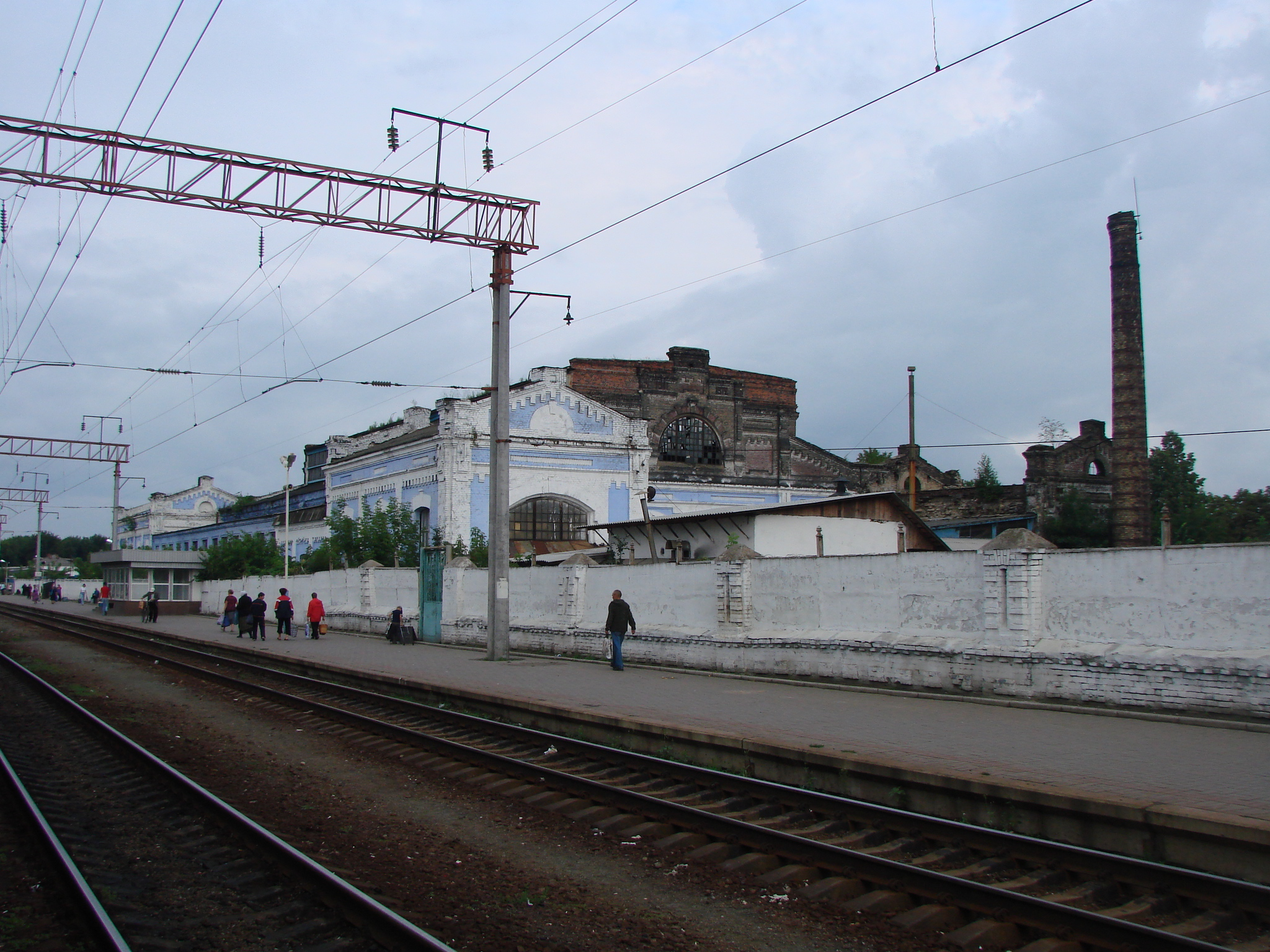
Main railroad workshop

The economy of Konotop is primarily focused on machine building, metalworking, and railways. Historically, the electromechanical plant Chervonyi Metalist was the largest enterprise in the city, although after independence, this has shifted to Motordetal, which occupies 40.7% of the city's total output, Aviakon, 12.7%, and Konotopmyaso, 12.7%.

Motordetal, the largest company in the city, manufactures cylinder liners for internal combustion engines, and employs around 670 people in the city. They provide their produces to Rolls-Royce, Scania, Iveco, and Mercedes-Benz. In 2023, under a ruling by the High Anti-Corruption Court, it was ordered that all ownership in the company be transferred, which had belonged to Serhiy Kalashnikov, a Russian politician who is a member of the Federation Council and sanctioned by Ukraine. Motordetal then came under the temporary management of the State Property Fund of Ukraine, which started a privatisation effort, although this has not succeeded. Aviakon is a state-owned aircraft repair plant that was founded in 1931, primarily working in repairing aircraft produced by Mil Helicopters, such as the Mil Mi-17. Konotopmyaso is a meat-processing plant, while Chervonyi Metalist, prior to its closure in 2009, built electric motors, electric cutting machines, and industrial machines for the mining industry.

Other important enterprises include the Konotop Casting and Mechanical Plant, the Konotop Fittings Plant, the Konotop Car Repair Plant, a mechanical plant, a garment factory, a dairy plant, and a bakery plant.

== Education ==
=== Higher education ===
Konotop has multiple institutions of higher education. The universities are: Konotop Institute of Sumy State University, Classical Professional College of Sumy State University, Konotop Professional Medical College, Konotop branch of the European University, and the Konotop branch of the Interregional Academy of Personnel Management. The branch of Sumy State University is the oldest, having been originally known as the Sumy Technicum of Agricultural Construction when it opened up in 1945, before being renamed to Konotop Industrial-Pedagogical Technicum and absorbed in 2004 to make the branch of Sumy State University, currently enrolling around 1,400 students. A 2019 assessment found that Konotop faced challenges structurally in higher education due to outdated materials from the Soviet era and slow adaptation to the labour market, such as IT, which had led to a brain drain to larger cities like Sumy and Kyiv.

=== Secondary education ===
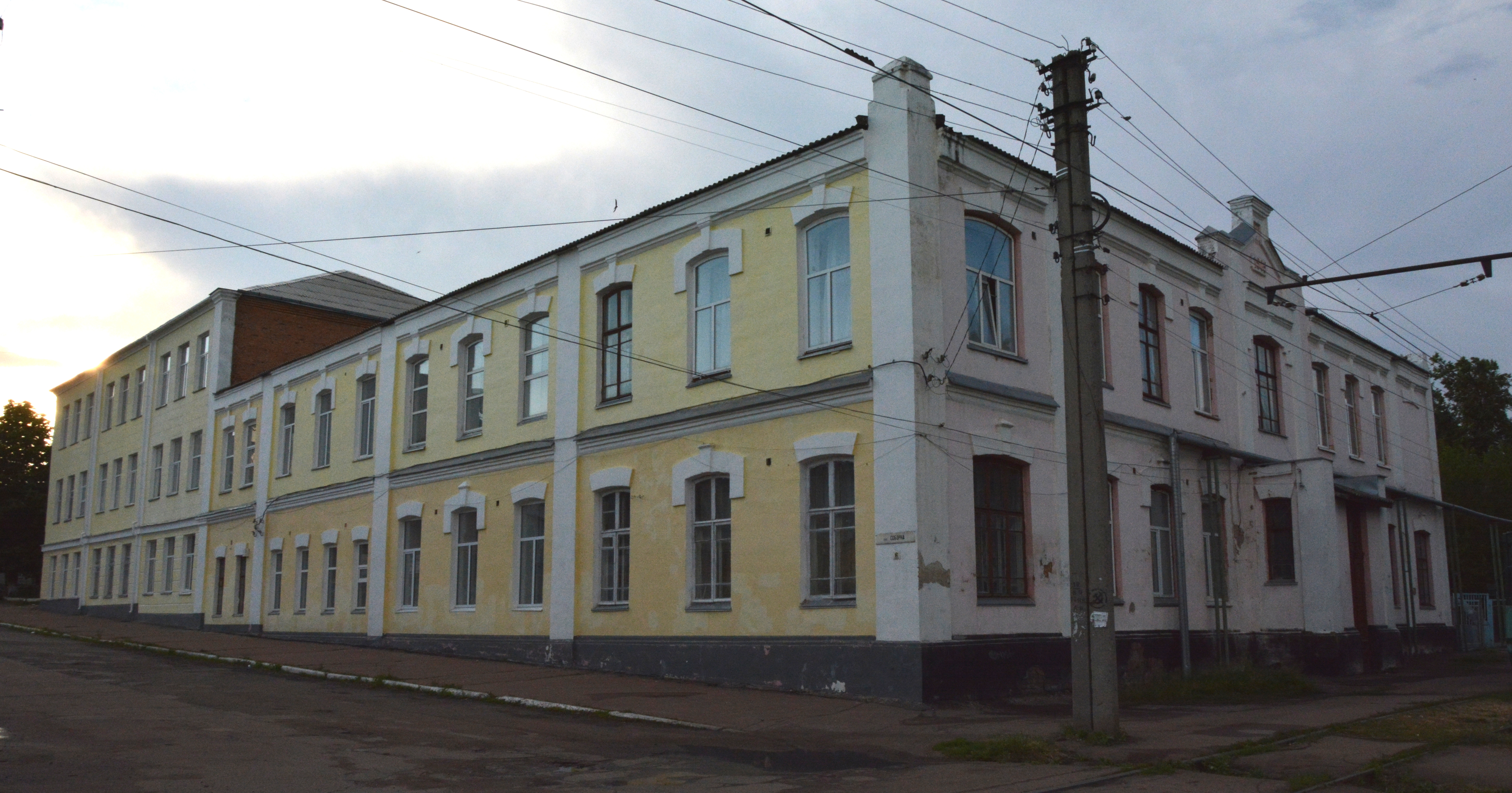
School No. 2

As of the 2020s, 14 secondary schools in the city serve 6,675 students. Since the 2019-19 school year, most schools have used the "New Ukrainian School" structure, which as part of the program, requires "pedagogical innovations". Most of the schools are numbered schools except for a dedicated gymnasium and the Centre for Children and Youth Creativity.

=== Public libraries ===
Konotop has a centralised library system, which was established in January 1998 when the adult library, which was a branch of the Konotop Raion, was reorganised into being the system's central library for the city, which in 2008 was named after S.I. Ponomariov. The city has had a library since at least 1945, which was located at a reading room on Lenin Avenue 18. A dedicated space for the library was fully opened up in 1960. Other libraries that are part of the system include the Central Children's Library, an adult library at the youth sports school, a city children's library, and a library for Pidlypne. Since 2022, the libraries in the city have continued to operate, although on an adjusted schedule, such as the Pildypne library and the adult library in the youth sports school, now operating on Tuesday through Saturday.

== Infanstructure ==
=== Transportation ===
==== Local transportation ====
===== Tram =====
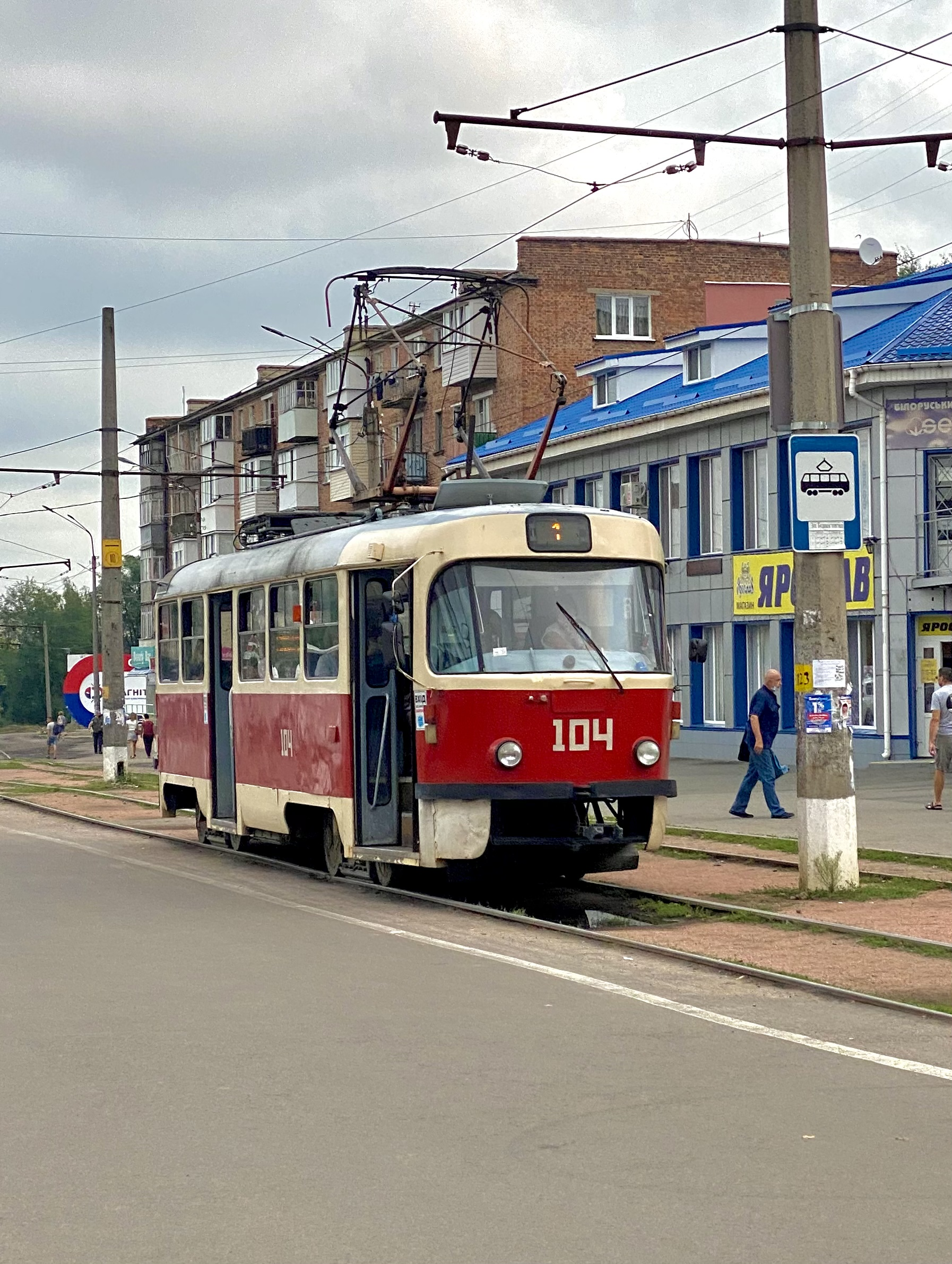
Tatra T3 in Konotop.

Map of tram routes in Konotop (2019).

Konotop has one of the few lasting tram systems in Ukraine, after many were scrapped post-independence, and is the only one in Sumy Oblast as Sumy's network was closed in 1999. It is the second-smallest city in Ukraine with a tram system, after Druzhkivka in Donetsk Oblast. In addition, it is one of the shortest lines in Ukraine, at 27.8 km across 3 routes. The fare was briefly free starting on 16 February 2023 until a fare was added again later that year in December. The fare since January 2024 is 10 hryvnias, which was added due to layoffs and redirection of military personnel income tax. All trams use the 1520 mm gauge standard in Ukraine, and operate at around 12.2 km/h on average, which is one of the slowest rates in the country.

====== History ======
A tram was first advocated for in 1913 under Mayor Hryhorii Demchenko, although it would take until the spring of 1949 for the idea to be brought up again on a grassroots initiative. In the following months, rails were collected from the railway enterprises in the city, and in July the Konotop officials petitioned Moscow for official approval of a tram system in the city. The USSR soon approved this, transferring two Series "F" motor passenger trams from Moscow, and service began on 21 December 1949 on the day of Joseph Stalin's birthday. Over the next few decades in the Soviet Union, the city's network was expanded, and more trams were added to its fleet, and by the late 1980s the city had 40 KTM-5 trams built by UKVZ. Many trams were coupled in pairs and operated without conductors.

However, during the 1990s, the tram system went into a serious decline. The newest tram that was received was in 2007, a Tatra-Yug K1 constructed by Pivdenmash. By 2013, there were repeated labour strikes which led to the enterprise's director resigning, and further trams were destroyed in a fire at a depot or were derailed. In June 2018, the tram's operator was put into a downtime status due to debt, with the depot being disconnected from power entirely. This trend was reversed by the late 2010s, as in 2019, six new tram cars bought from Western Europe through a petition by MP Ihor Molotok were brought into service. The city of Riga, Latvia, also donated nine Tatra T3A's that were no longer in use. This was followed up in February 2023 by 23 Konstal 105Na's from Warsaw's tram operator after they were retired in favour of the Hyundai Rotem tram cars. Later that year, in December, the city of Ostrava, Czechia, donated 25 Tatra T6A5 trams, the T3's successor, as part of a gift from the Czech Ministry of Foreign Affairs. By 2024, after these donations, there were 56 tram cars in the city.

====== Current routes ======
As of 2026, the city operates three different routes:

- Route No. 1: Depovskaya Street to Zagrebellya (6.91 km, 5 hryvnias)
- Route No. 2: Ryaboshapka Street to Motordetal plant (10.9 km, 5 hryvnias)
- Route No. 3: KVRZ Village to Depovskaya Street (4.67 km, 5 hryvnias)

===== Buses =====
Konotop has both suburban city buses and intercity bus service operating within the city, with the central bus station being located at vul. Klubna, 8. The city council in December 2018 raised the single-ride fare to 5.50 hryvnias, although with a reduction for students; this has since risen to 8 hryvnias per ride. The intercity buses mostly run to other cities in Sumy Oblast such as Romny, Popivka, and Sumy itself.

Since 2022, in response to the Russian invasion of Ukraine and strikes against the city's municipal bus fleet, the city has received numerous buses for use. In November 2022, Ostrava first sent four Solaris Urbino 10 and three Solaris Urbino 12 buses to Konotop. In November 2025, the city of Baden in Switzerland sent four 18-metre articulated MAN NG 313 buses, each with a 40-seat capacity. The city also still continues to use older Soviet-era buses in addition to the new ones, such as GAZelle buses.

====== Current routes ======
As of 2026, the city operates eighteen different routes:

- Route No. 1: vul. Riaboshapky to "Motordetal" Plant (10.07 km)
- Route No. 2: vul. Riaboshapky to Zhytlovyi masyv (7.97 km)
- Route No. 3: Selyshche KVRZ to vul. Budivelnykiv (9.95 km)
- Route No. 4: School No. 3 to Zahrebellia (10.58 km)
- Route No. 5: vul. Riaboshapky to s. Komsomolska Komuna (11.36 km)
- Route No. 6: vul. Ivana Franka to vul. Metalistiv (10.11 km)
- Route No. 7: vul. Budivelnykiv to vul. Bohdana Khmelnytskoho (s. Pryvokzalne) (10.12 km)
- Route No. 8: vul. Profesiina to vul. Budivelnykiv (9.98 km)
- Route No. 9: School No. 3 to vul. Sarnavska (8.82 km)
- Route No. 10: Zahrebellia to s. Pidlypne (via Roshcha) (11.71 km)
- Route No. 11: s. Pidlypne – vul. Lisovoho to Zhytlovyi masyv (vul. Budivelnykiv) (10.98 km)
- Route No. 12: School No. 3 to vul. Vesniana (10.94 km)
- Route No. 14: School No. 3 to SPTU-33 (12.56 km)
- Route No. 15: vul. Riaboshapky to vul. Internatna (11.31 km)
- Route No. 16: vul. Hastelo to Zhytlovyi masyv (vul. Budivelnykiv) (9.32 km)
- Route No. 17: Selyshche KVRZ to vul. Budivelnykiv (9.79 km)
- Route No. 19: School No. 3 to s. Sarnavshchyna (13.52 km)
- Route No. 20: vul. Riaboshapky to "Motordetal" Plant (10.17 km)

==== Roads and bridges ====
The closest European route is, which goes to Hlukhiv and into Russia. The closest Ukrainian international highway is M02, which runs north to Hlukhiv from Chernihiv Oblast, while the closest national highway as part of the H-network is H07, which runs south to Sumy from Chernihiv Oblast. The other roads that pass through the city are the regional highways P60, which comes from Krolevets into Romny, and P61, which comes from Baturyn into Sumy. In terms of the T-network, the territorial route, the city is also connected to T 1910, which has a total length of 43.7 km and connects Konotop to Buryn and Chumakove, alongside T 1925, which is only 4 km and connects Konotop to Sosnivka.

==== Air transport ====
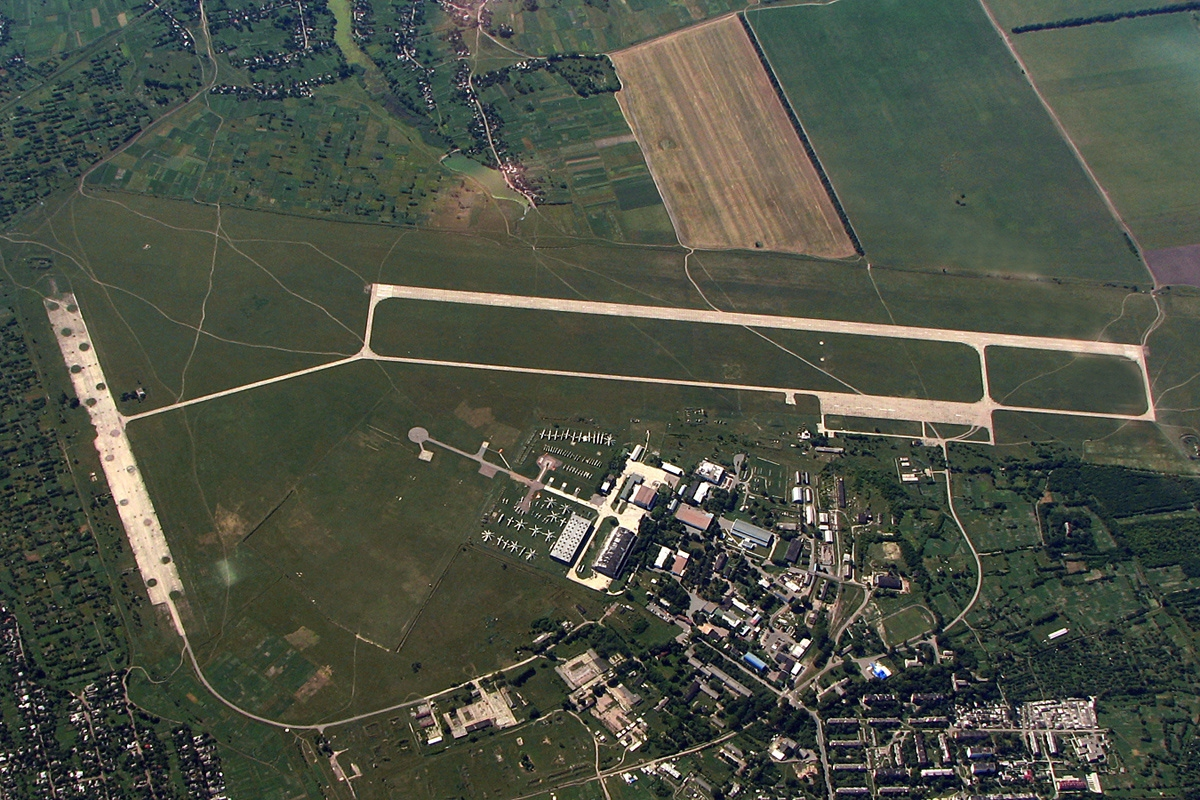
Konotop Air Base

The city does not have a civilian airbase, but it does have a military airbase in use by the Ukrainian Air Force, Konotop Air Base. According to a since declassified report by the CIA in 1952, the airfield is north of Konotop, with three hangars, a concrete runway, and a quartering building. It hosted about 100 twin-engine aircraft and biplanes at the time. It is primarily home to the 105th Aviation Training Regiment, which fly Aero L-39 Albatros training jets.

==== Railways ====
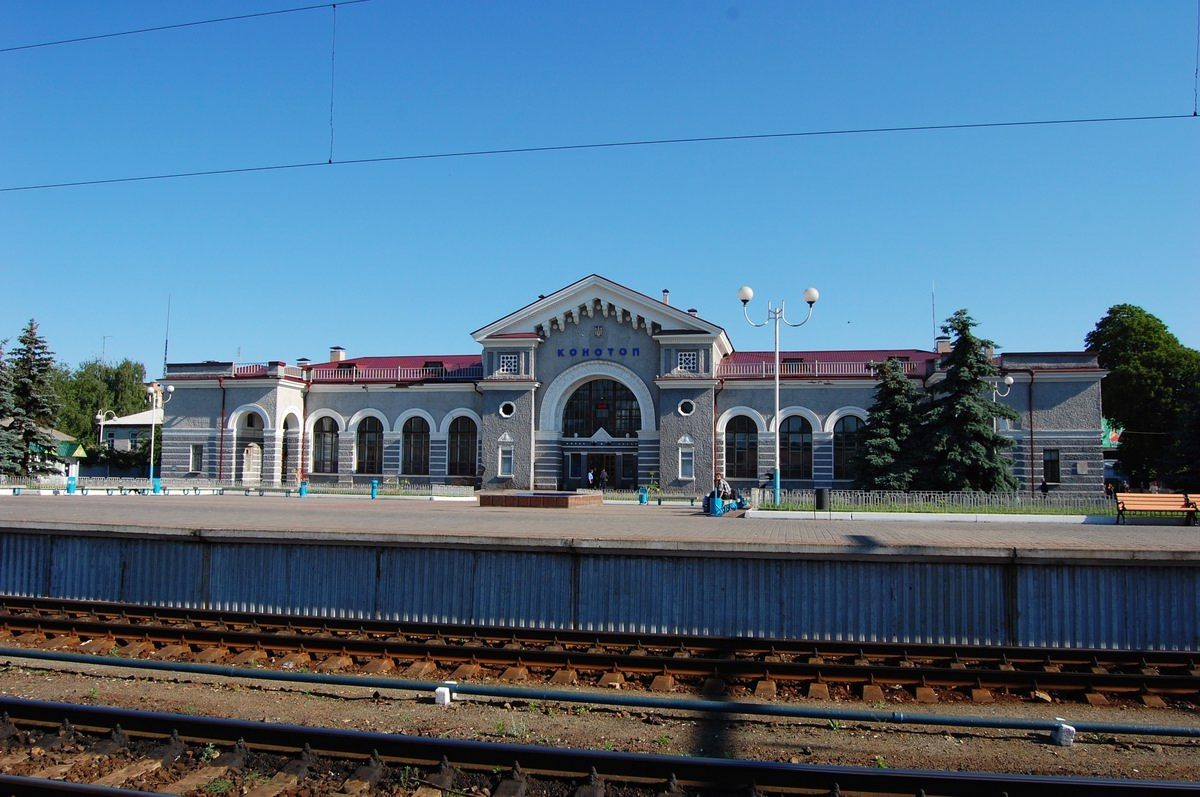
Konotop Railway Station

The city is a very important railway junction center, being one of the five directorates with its own administrative seat of the Southwestern Railways. Various railroad connections from Konotop include suburban routes to Nizhyn, Vorozhba, and Bakhmach, while long distance routes go from Kyiv to Fastiv. Historically, other long distance routes have included to Kharkiv, Moscow, Kursk, Gomel, Vitebsk, and Poltava, although many routes to Russia have since shut down. The section from Konotop to Vorozhba, which measures 76 km, was electrified in 2010.

===== History =====
Konotop first had a railway under Alexander II, along which a line was run from Kursk to Kyiv. The extended section of Kursk to Vorozhba was opened up in November 1868, and a few weeks later the Vorozhba to Bakhmach was also completed. That same year, the main station of Konotop was completed alongside its depot. At the time of its construction, Konotop was one of only three designated first-class stations on the line running from Kyiv to Kursk. However, during the German occupation of the Ukrainian SSR, much of the railway to Konotop was intentionally destroyed alongside its wagon depot. After liberation, passenger service was restored by January 1944, and throughout the end of the war it can became important for carrying fuel tonnage to the frontlines. In the late 1940s, the station at Konotop was rebuilt alongside the line running Konotop-Vorozhba-Bakhmach.

By the 1950s, Konotop had once again become a major hub for the Southwestern Railway, with dozens of stations and depots, and was an important border crossing into both Russia and Belarus (at Khorobychi). The Konotop Directorate of the railways spanned 1,100 km of line by the late 1980s and 488 km of station track. After Ukrainian independence, the Konotop Directorate and the Russian authorities decided to exchange different border stations, although the general freight volumes declined.

=== Energy ===
Energy to the city primarily comes from the 330/110 kV substation "Konotop", which has three substations "Konotop", "Porshen", and "Pidlypne". Around 66% of the electricity goes to consumer use, while 29% goes to industrial use, and the rest is split between non-households and municipal transport, such as trams and buses. Since 2022, with the Russian invasion of Ukraine, the regional energy distribution company Sumyoblenergo has imposed hourly power-outage schedules in Sumy Oblast in order to prevent emergency blackouts.

Heating is provided by three companies: KP "Teplogarant", TOV "Teplovodpostach", and TOV "Aviakon". Together, they operate 38 boiler houses, most of which are older Soviet-era NIISTU-5 units, in the city with a capacity of 179 Gcal/h. The piping network for the heating is around 63.5 km long and has been described as worn out. Natural gas to the city comes from the Konotop AGRS station, with 44% being used by householders, 35% for heat supply, and 20% for industry. In recent years, however, there has been a push for renewable energy, particularly through private solar-energy companies, especially due to the outages. By 2030, it is planned by the city council for the city to rely on at least 35% of its energy consumption coming from renewables.

=== Water and sanitation ===
KP VUVKH (Виробниче управління водопровідно-каналізаційного господарства) provides water and sanitation services to Konotop. The city has 18 water pumping stations that are distributed via a ringed network, although the system has suffered from extensive losses (around 31.6% of water is believed to be lost during transmission). There are 14 sewage pumping stations, which are then treated at a central facility in Konotop.

== International relations ==
Konotop is twinned with:

- Mezdra, Bulgaria (since 2012)
- Krasnohorivka, Ukraine (since 2016)
- Rzeszów, Poland (since 2023)
- Stargard, Poland (since 2023)
- Stryi, Ukraine (since 2024)
- Skhidnytsia, Ukraine (since 2024)
- Truskavets, Ukraine (since 2024)

== Notable people ==
- Mikhail Dragomirov, Russian Imperial Army general
- Bernard Meninsky, artist
- Yuriy Musatov, ceramic artist
- Ihor Skybiuk, military officer and former commander of the Ukrainian Air Assault Forces
- Yisrael Bar-Yehuda, Israeli politician and Zionist activist
- Volodymyr Chemerys, Ukrainian politician and leader of Ukraine without Kuchma
- Mikhail Mamiashvili, Russian-Georgian Greco-Roman wrestler
- Anatoliy Yahoferov, Ukrainian politician

== Gallery ==
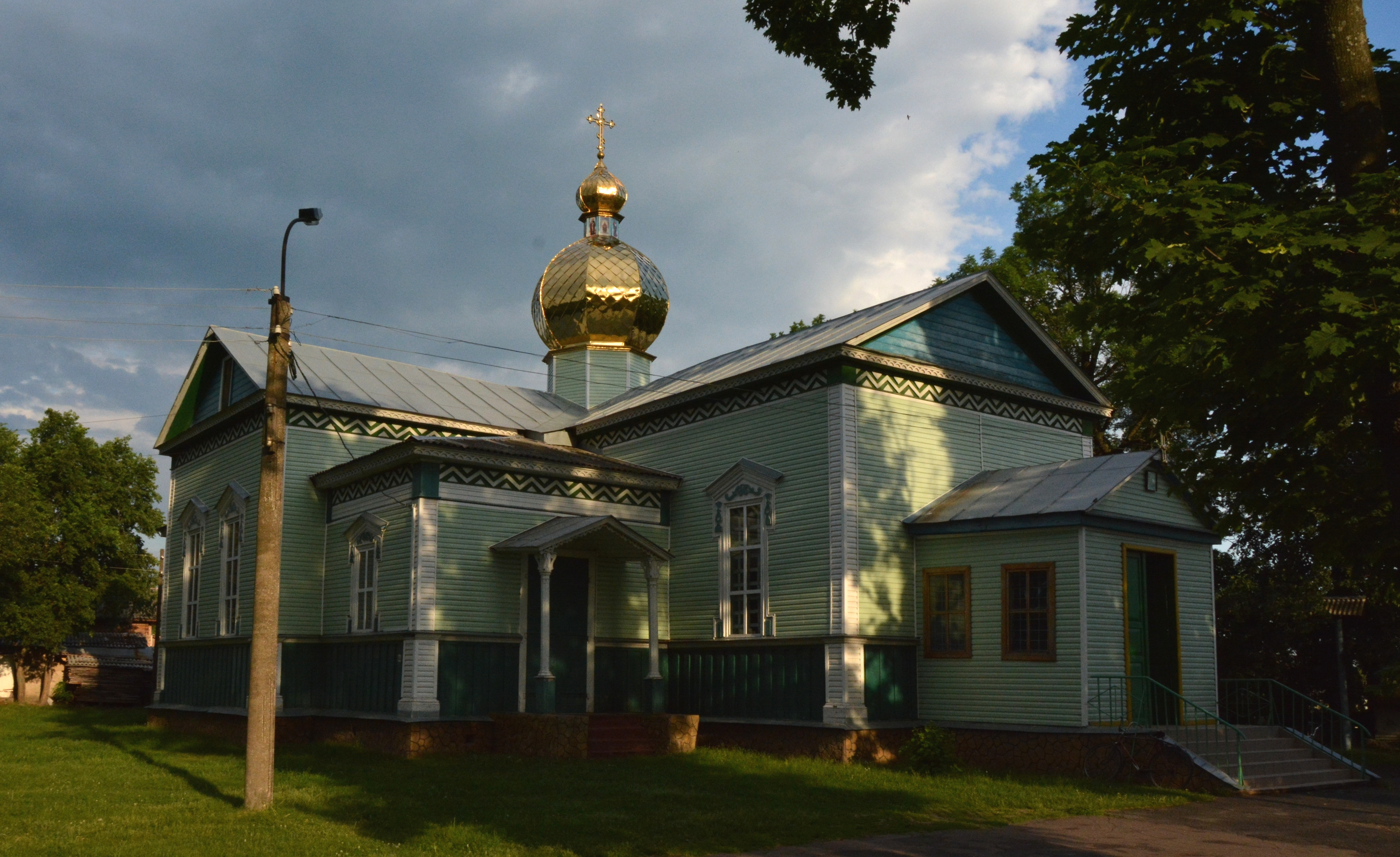
St. Nikolas wooden church

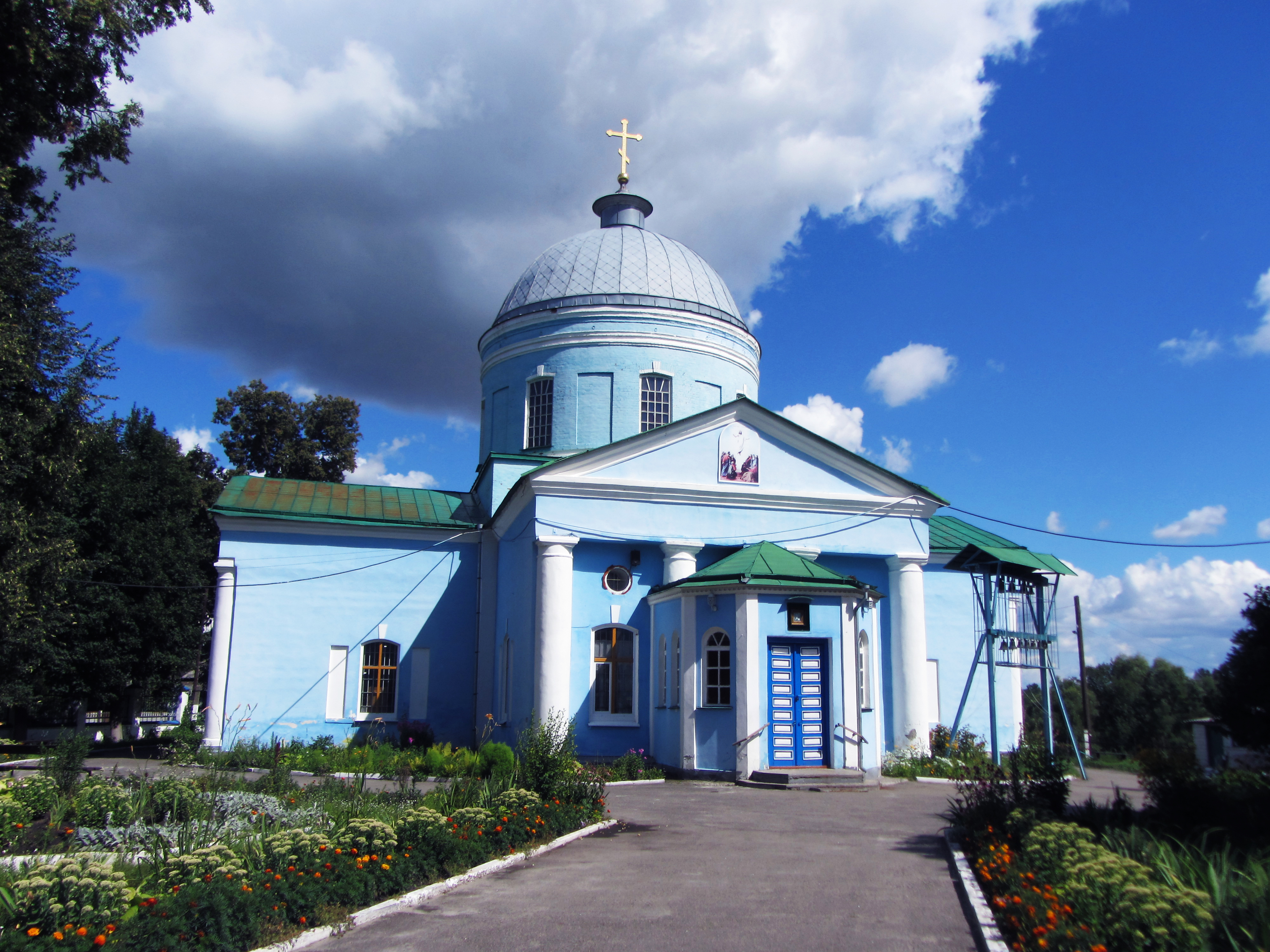
Ascension Church

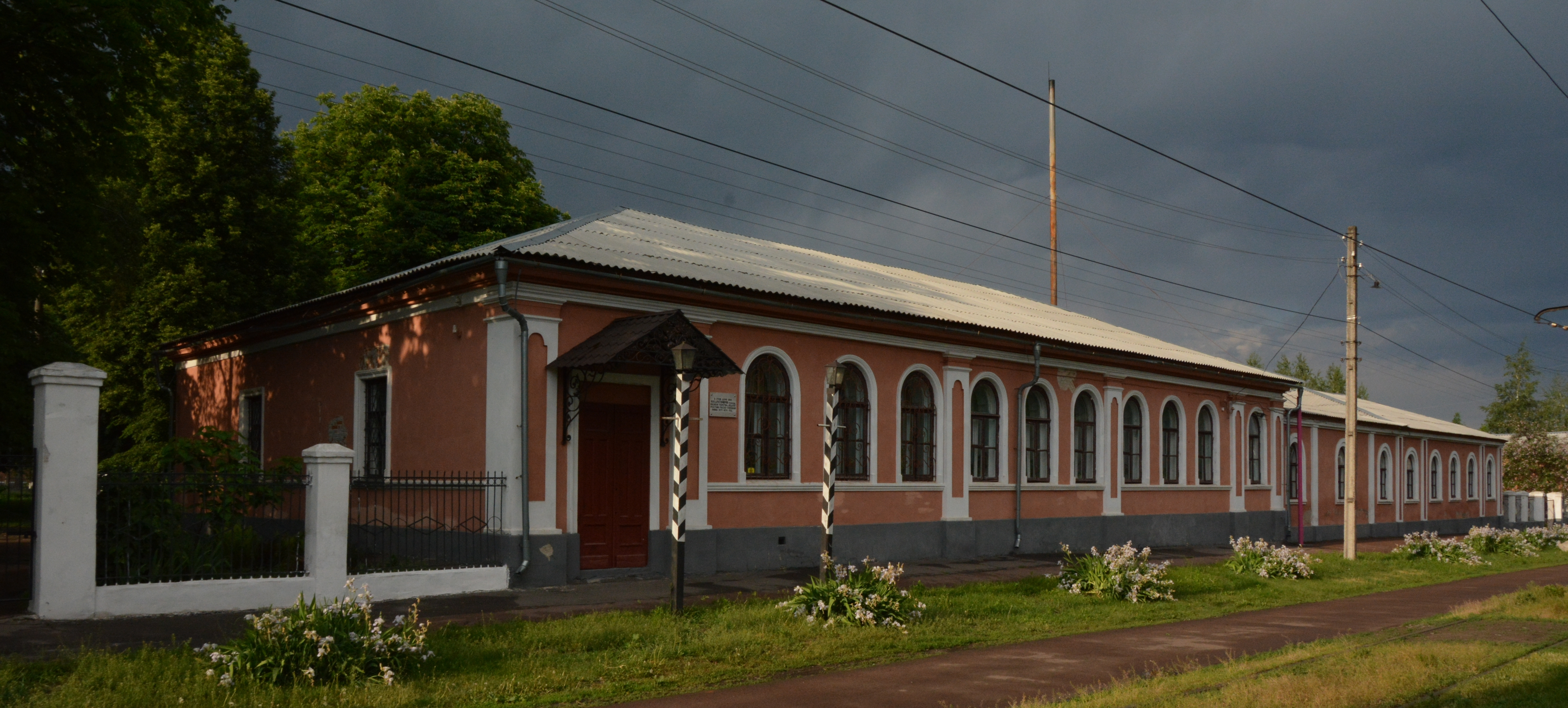
Mansion of General Mikhail Dragomirov

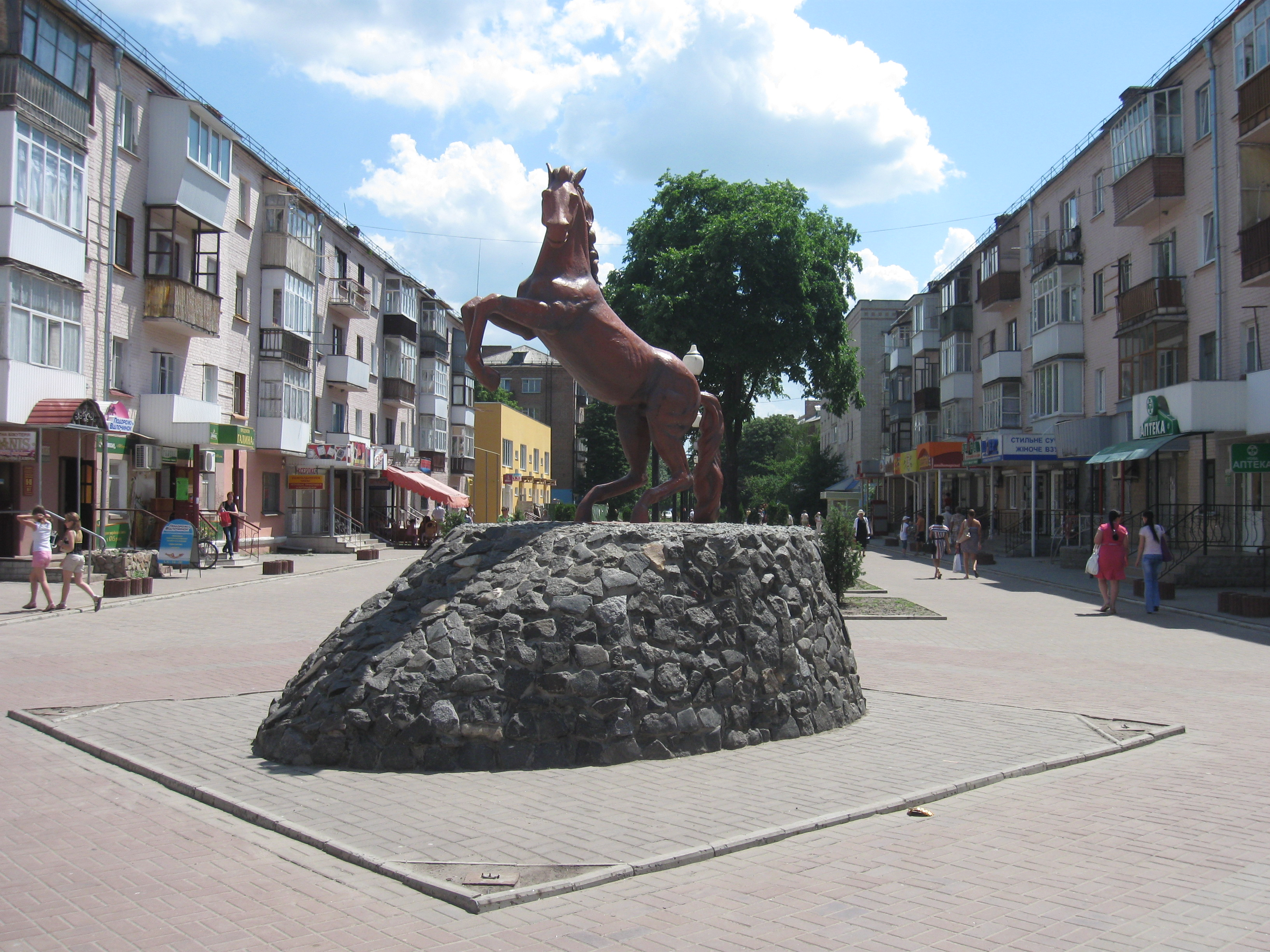
Horse statue in the downtown

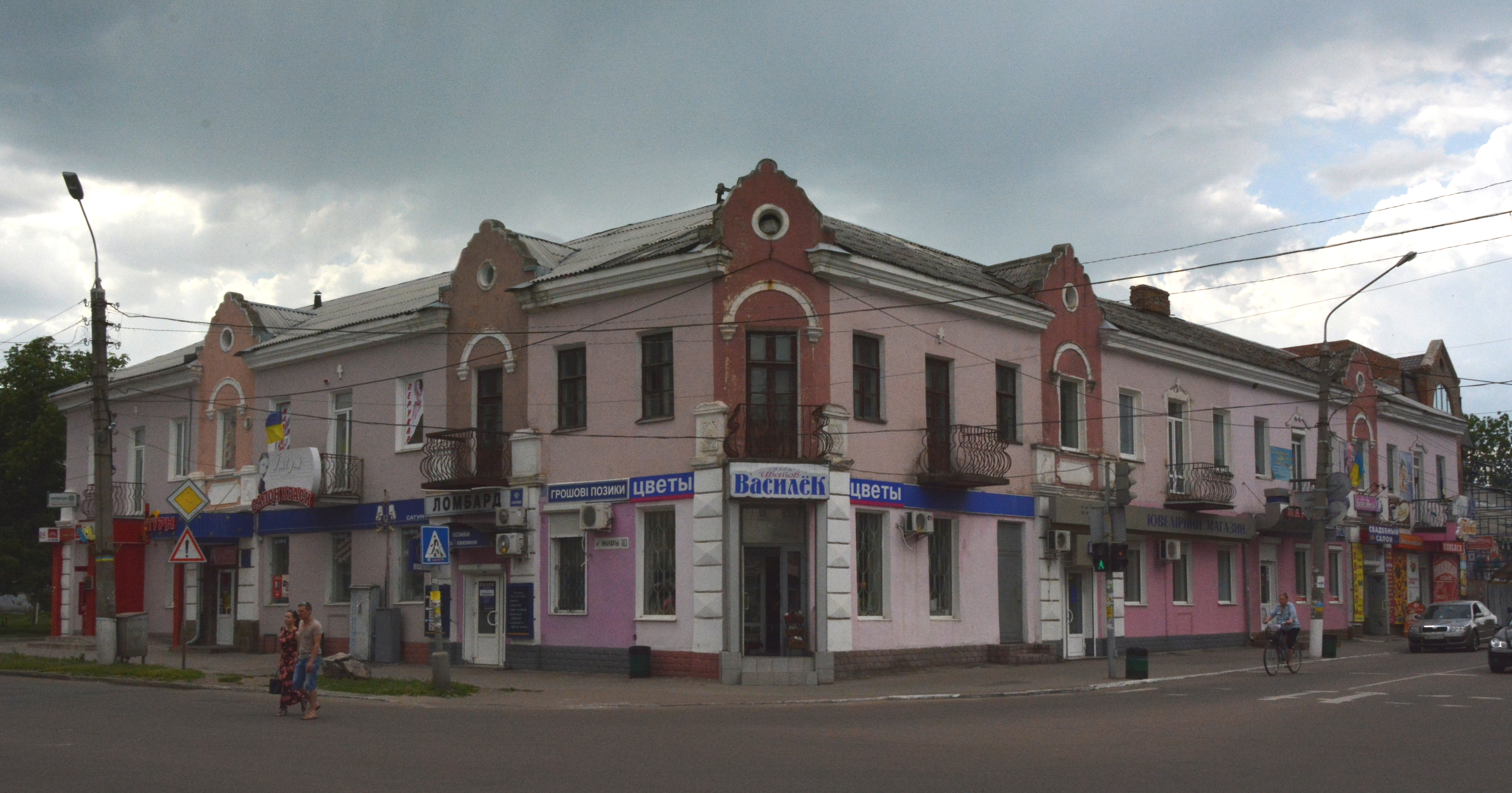
Old town

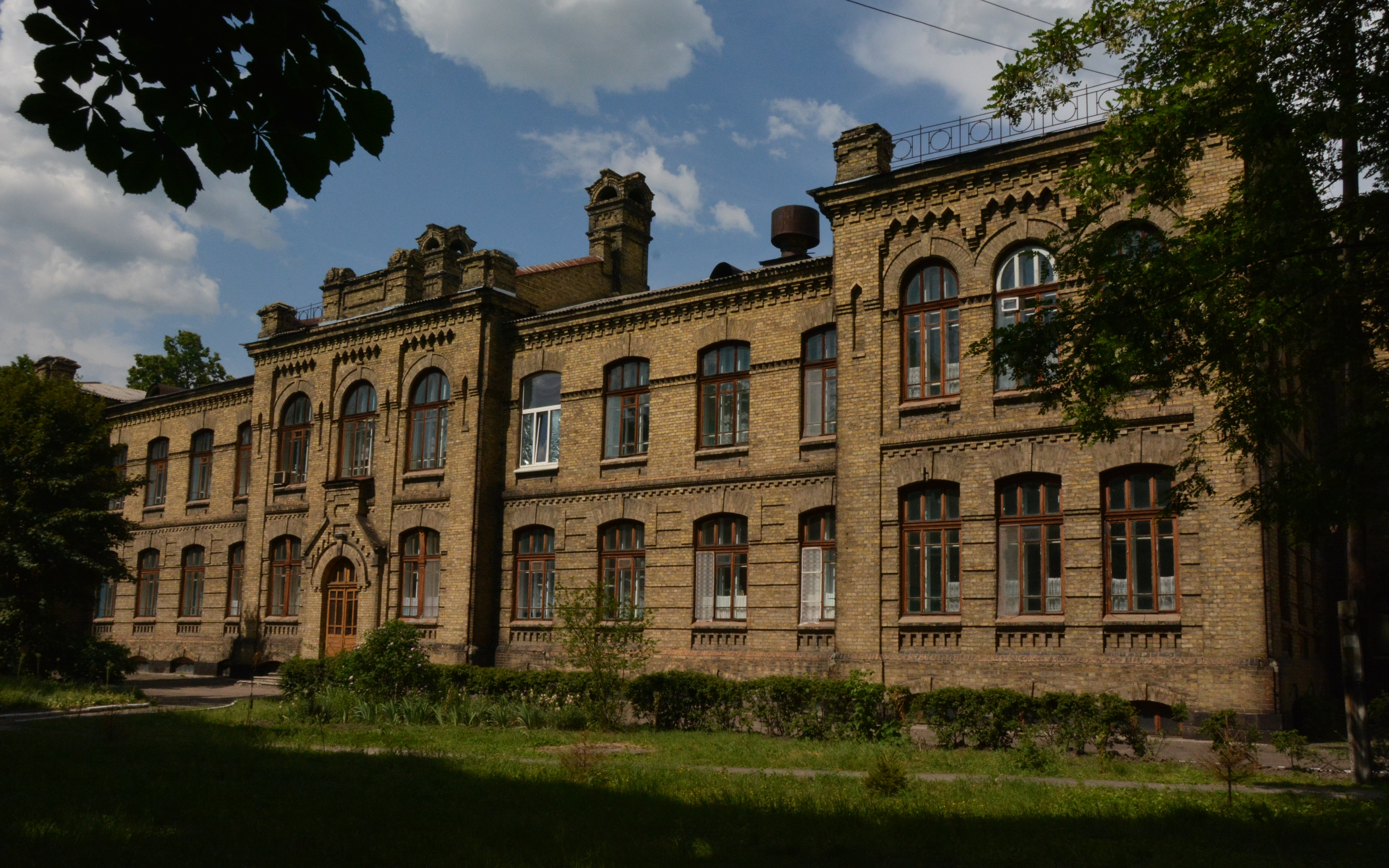
Konotop Railway Hospital

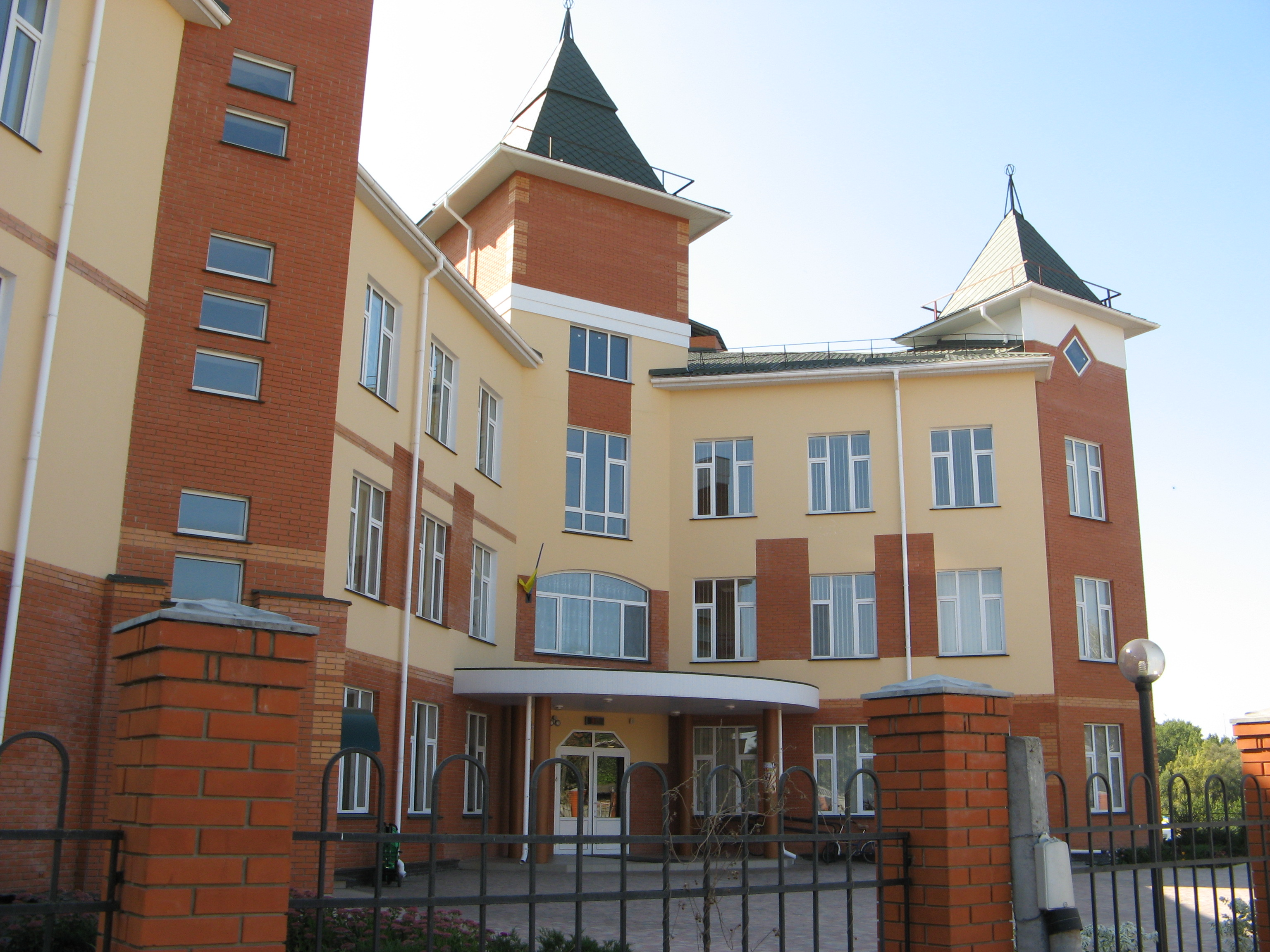
School in Konotop

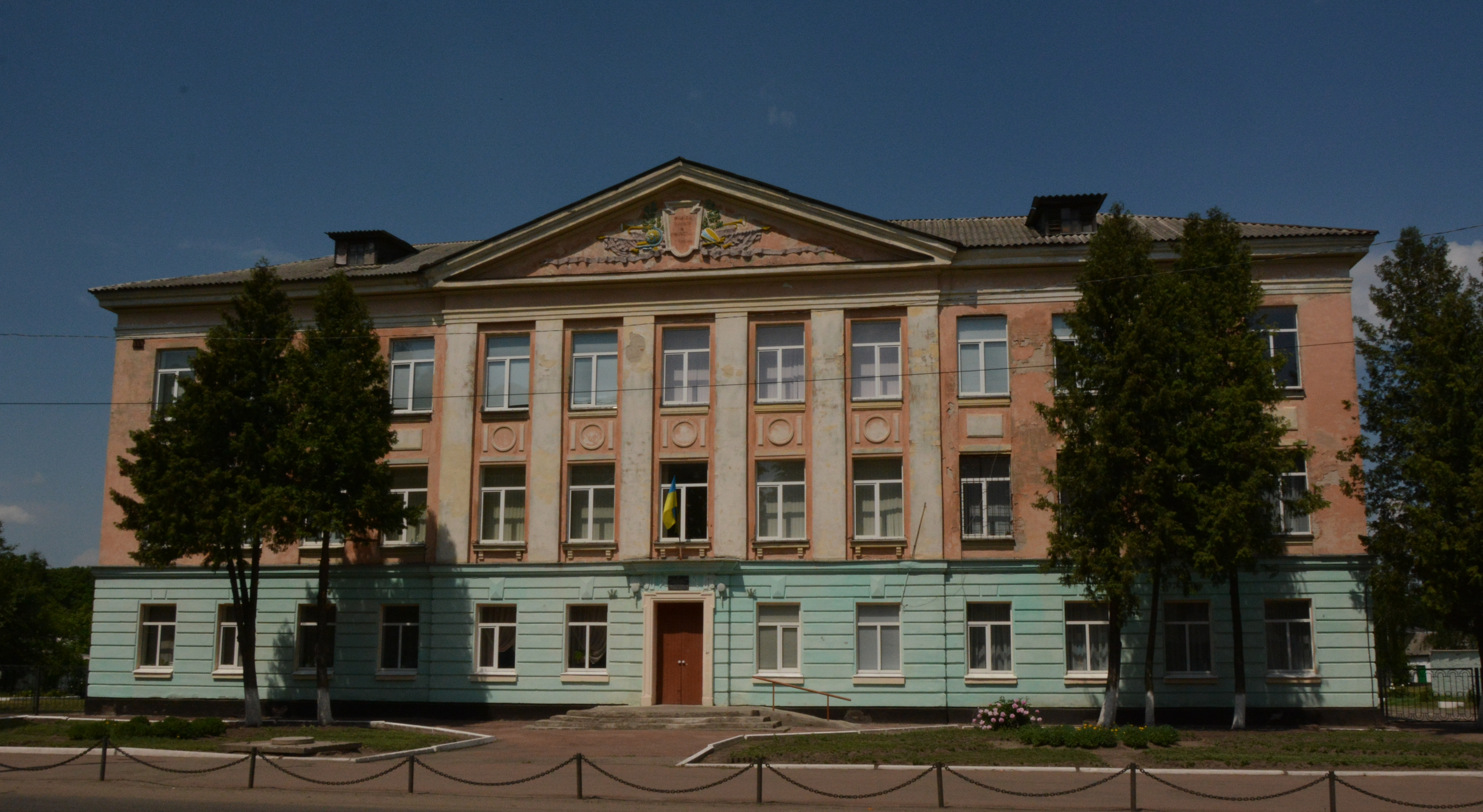
Old school in Konotop

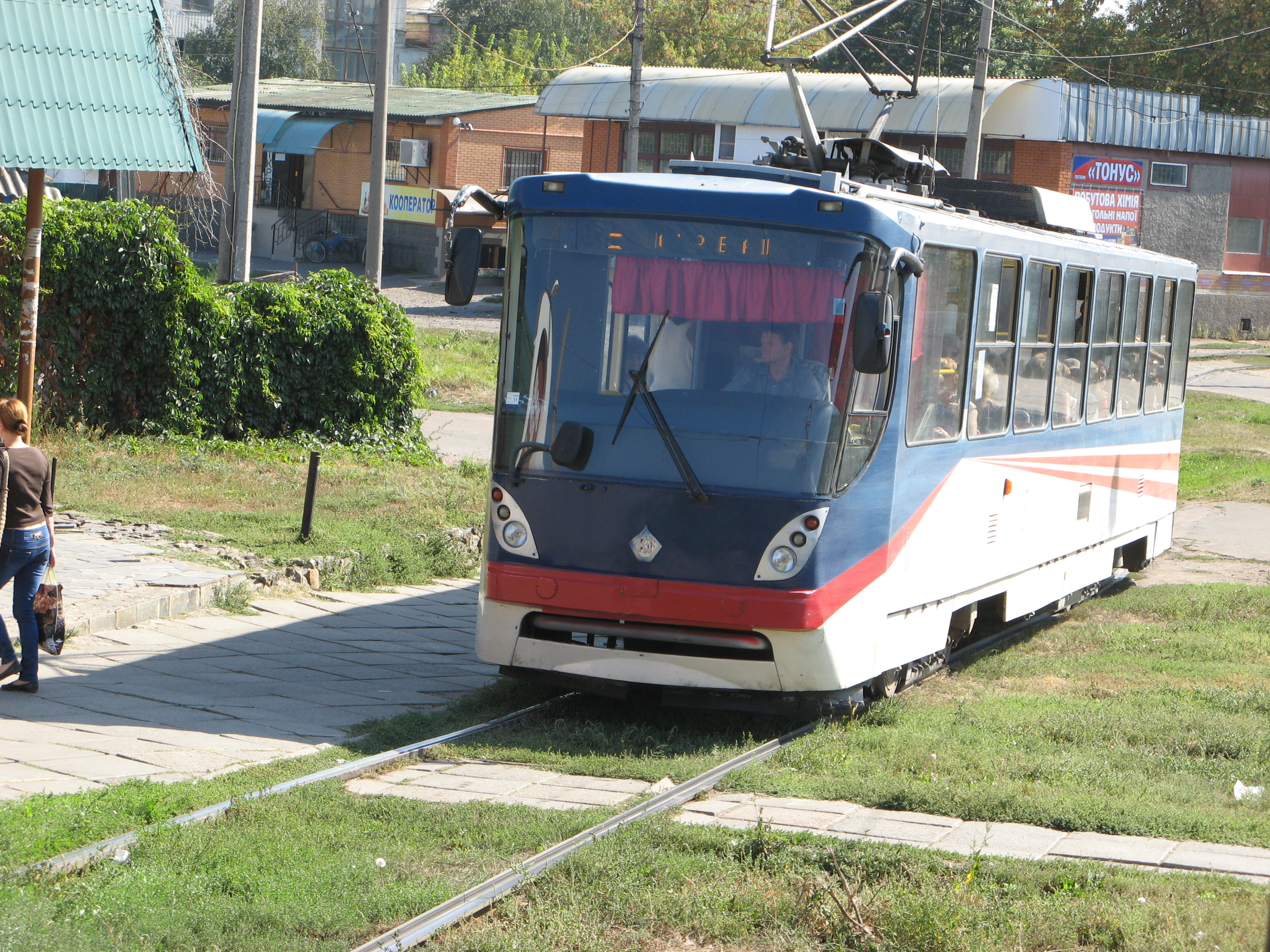
Konotop tram

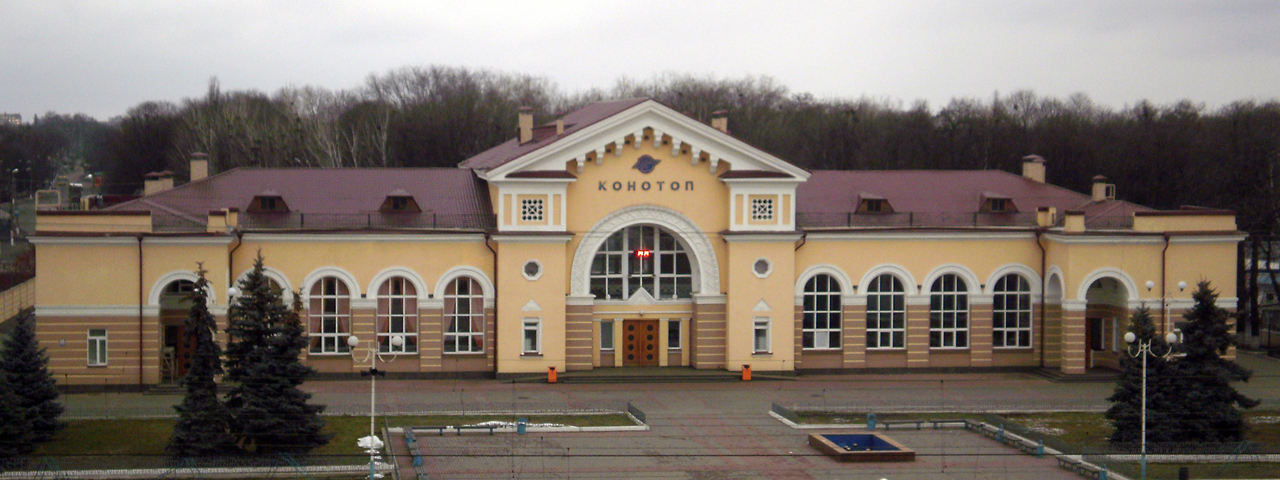
Railway station
