= Hryhoriy Hulyanytsky =

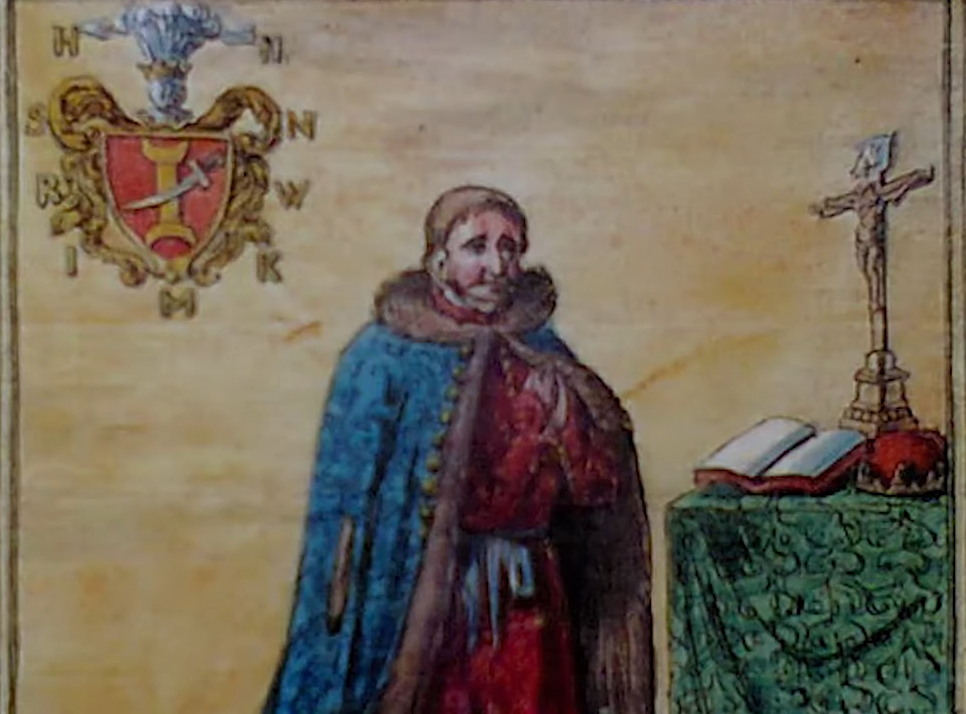
Hryhoriy Hulyanytsky (or, possibly, his relative Ivan), copy of a portrait on a 17th-century banner

Hryhoriy Hulyanytsky (Old Ukrainian: Григорий Гуляницкий, Григорій Гулянѣцкій; Ukrainian: Григорій Гуляницький) (died 1679) was a Ukrainian Cossack colonel, a skilled warrior and a shrewd politician.

Hryhoriy Hulyanytsky was born to a family of Ruthenian gentry of Ostoja Coat of Arms in the town of Korsun. His date of birth and earlier period of life are unknown.

During the Khmelnytsky Uprising of 1648–54, Hulyanytsky was sent by hetman Bohdan Khmelnytsky as an envoy to Muscovy. Hulyanytsky went to Moscow on two occasions, in 1649 and in 1654, to help negotiate the terms of the Treaty of Pereyaslav.

Hulyanytsky was appointed as colonel of Nizhyn in (1655–1659), and colonel of Korsun regiments in (1662–1664).

From the onset of the period of Ukrainian history known as the Ruin and during the civil war that followed, Hulyanytsky was an ardent supporter of hetman Ivan Vyhovsky and his pro-Polish policies. In particular, Hulyanytsky's participation was instrumental in the defeat of pro-Moscow adversaries of Vyhovsky Martyn Pushkar and Iakiv Barabash in 1657–1658.

During the civil war and the Muscovite invasion in 1658–1659, Hulyanytsky made several daring attacks against invading forces and Moscow's supporters. Hylyanytsky was also among several prominent Cossacks who wrote a famous letter to Ivan Bezpalyi – the then Moscow-appointed hetman – not to betray his country and Vyhovsky .

Hulyanytsky's most noted exploit during the Muscovite invasion was the defence of Konotop. Hulyanytsky and his men (estimated to be around 4,000) held the fortress for 70 days against the 28,000 strong army of Prince Trubetskoy. Hylyanytsky's stubborn defence of Konotop was instrumental in defeating the invaders when Ivan Vyhovsky in alliance with Crimean Tatars and Poles routed the Muscovite army at Konotop on June 29, 1659.

However, with the downfall of Vyhovsky that followed, Hulyanytsky was removed from his office by the new hetman. In 1659, Hulyanytsky allied himself with another hetman, Yurii Khmelnytsky. An ardent opponent of Moscow, Hulyanytsky was of one several Cossacks, who on behalf of the hetman negotiated the conditions of the new Chudniv Treaty with the Poles. The new treaty was similar in form to the Treaty of Hadiach of 1658 but with far worse conditions for Ukraine. Signing of this treaty by the hetman provoked a new round of civil war.

With the downfall and removal from office of Yurii Khmelnytsky, Hulyanytsky served with another hetman, Pavlo Teteria (1663–1665). As the hetman's envoy to Warsaw, Hulyanytsky persuaded the Polish King, Jan Kazimierz, to march on Ukraine together with Teteria in 1663–1664, which further inflamed the civil war without yielding any results.

The fate of Hulyanytsky seems to resemble that of Ivan Vyhovsky in that even though he was an ardent supporter of Poland, just like Vyhovsky he was also killed by the Poles. In 1679 he was accused by the Poles of treason, jailed, and then executed.
