= Ruthenia =

Medieval exonym for Rus'

Rus' land/Ruthenia in yellow, Kievan Rus' under Oleg the Wise in gray, 862–912

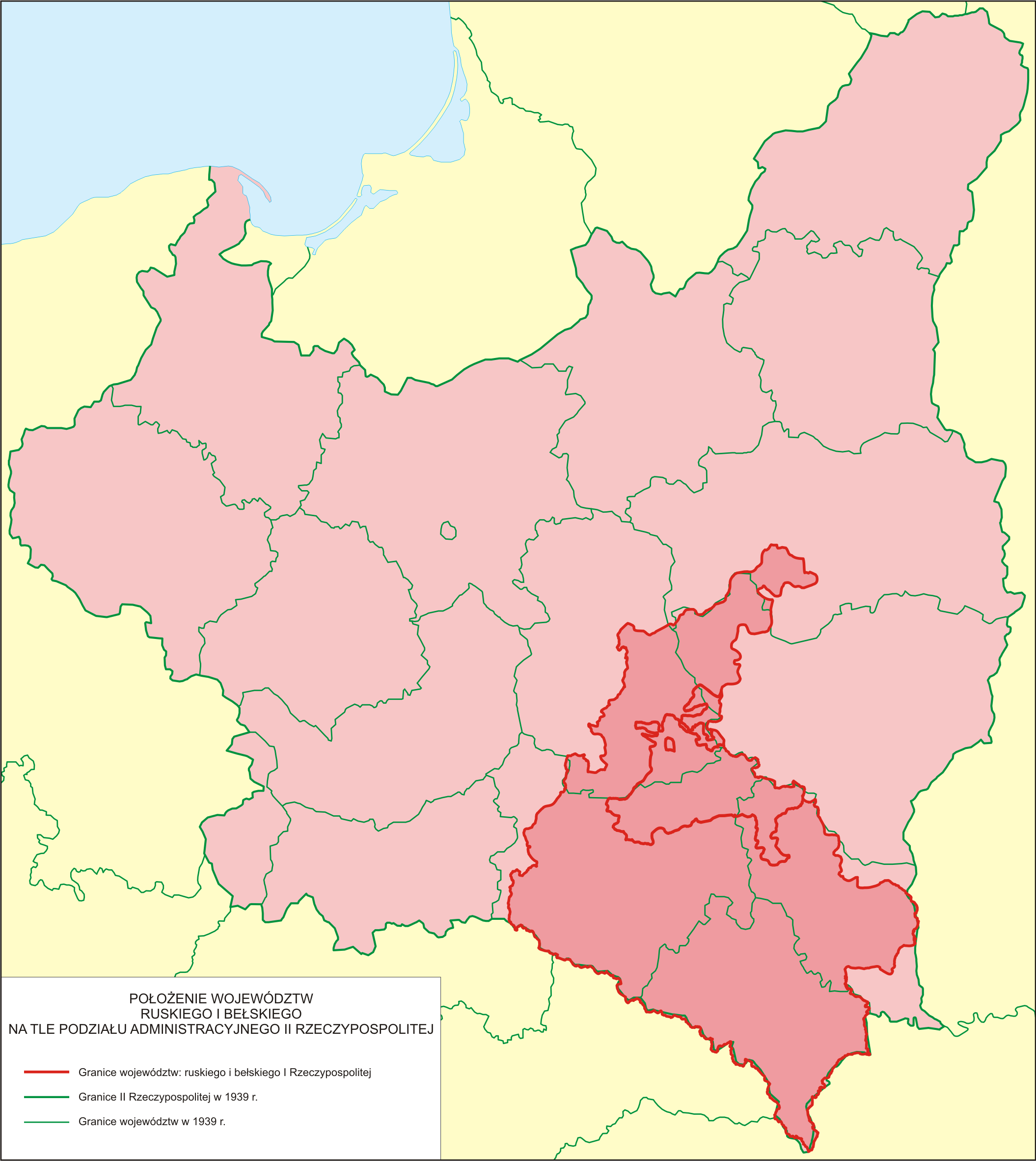
The area of bełskie voivodeship and ruskie voivodeship against the background of the administrative division of the Second Polish Republic in 1939, prior to the outbreak of World War II.

Ruthenia (Note: /ruːˈθiːniə/; Latin: Ruthenia or Rutenia, Ukrainian: Рутенія, romanized: Ruteniya or Русь, Rus', Polish: Ruś, Belarusian: Рутэнія, Русь, romanized: Rutenija, Ruś, Russian: Рутения, Русь, romanized: Rutieniya, Rus') is an exonym, originally used in Medieval Latin, as one of several terms for Rus'. The ethnonym Ruthenians was used to refer to the East Slavic and Eastern Orthodox people of the Grand Duchy of Lithuania and the Kingdom of Poland, and later the Polish–Lithuanian Commonwealth and Austria-Hungary, mainly to Ukrainians and sometimes Belarusians, inhabiting the territories of modern Belarus, Ukraine, Eastern Poland and some of western Russia.

Historically, in a broader sense, the term was used to refer to all the territories under Kievan dominion (mostly East Slavs).

The Kingdom of Galicia and Lodomeria (1772–1918), corresponding to parts of Western Ukraine, was referred to as Ruthenia and its people as Ruthenians. As a result of a Ukrainian national identity gradually dominating over much of present-day Ukraine in the 19th and 20th centuries, the endonym Rusyn is now only used among a minority of peoples on the territory of the Carpathian Mountains (Carpathian Ruthenia).

In 1844, Karl Ernst Claus, Russian naturalist and chemist of Baltic German origin, isolated the element ruthenium from platinum ore found in the Ural Mountains. Claus named the element after Ruthenia to honor Russia.

== Etymology ==
The word Ruthenia originated as a Latin designation of the region its people called Rus'. During the Middle Ages, writers in English and other Western European languages applied the term to lands inhabited by Eastern Slavs. Rusia or Ruthenia appears in the 1520 Latin treatise Mores, leges et ritus omnium gentium, per Ioannem Boëmum, Aubanum, Teutonicum ex multis clarissimis rerum scriptoribus collecti by Johann Boemus. In the chapter De Rusia sive Ruthenia, et recentibus Rusianorum moribus ("About Rus', or Ruthenia, and modern customs of the Rus'"), Boemus tells of a country extending from the Baltic Sea to the Caspian Sea and from the Don River to the northern ocean. It is a source of beeswax, its forests harbor many animals with valuable fur, and the capital city Moscow (Moscovia), named after the Moskva River (Moscum amnem), is 14 miles in circumference. Danish diplomat Jacob Ulfeldt, who traveled to Muscovy in 1578 to meet with Tsar Ivan IV, titled his posthumously (1608) published memoir Hodoeporicon Ruthenicum ("Voyage to Ruthenia").

== Early Middle Ages ==
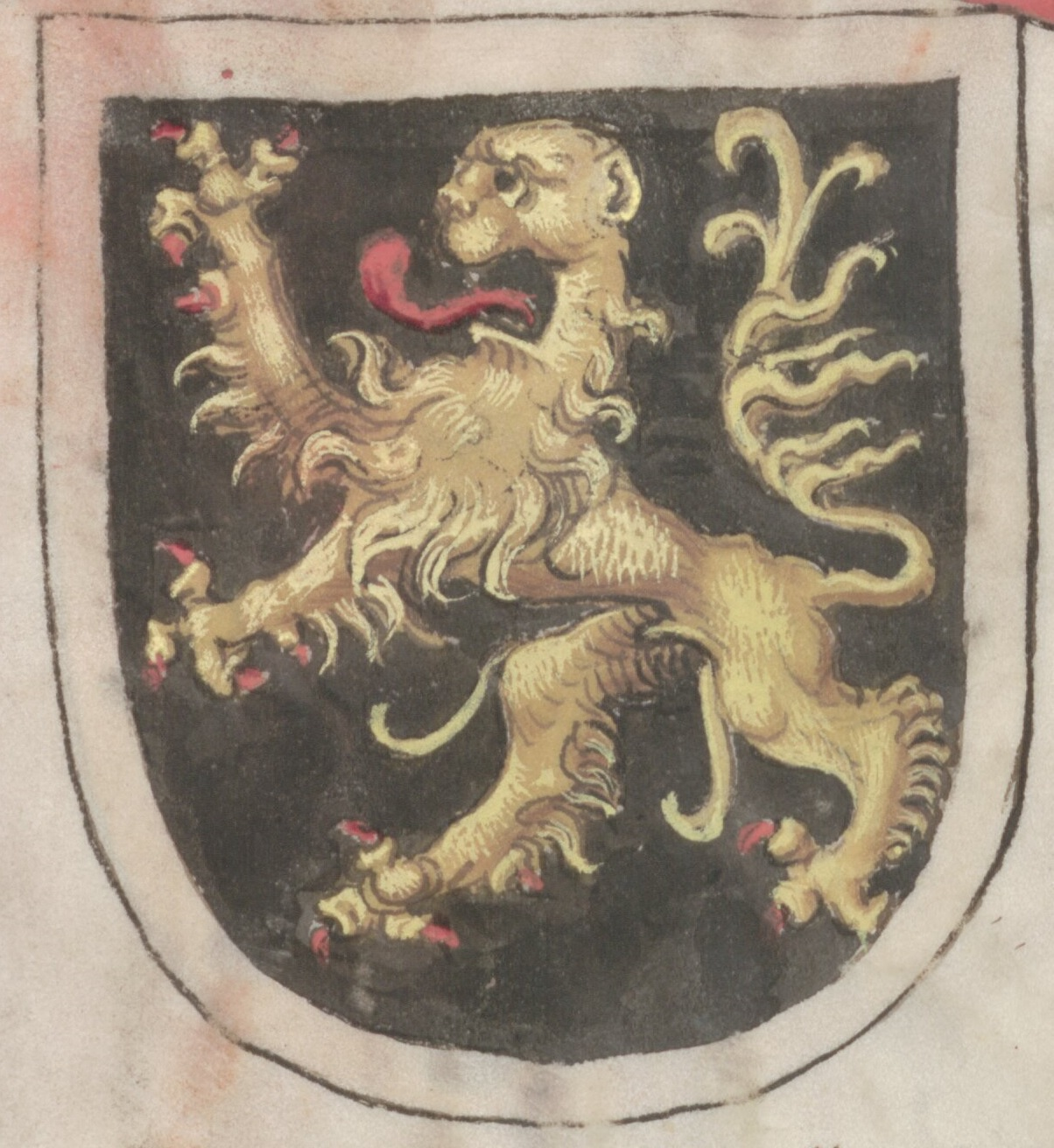
Ruthenian lion, which was used as a representative coat of arms of Ruthenia during the Council of Constance in the 15th century

In the 9th and 10th centuries, the tribe of the Polanians was known as the Rus' (Ukrainian: Русь). The Polanians' principal city was Kiev, and the tribe and its territory played an important role in organizing the Kievan Rus' state. Eventually, the name Rus' was applied to refer to all the tribes in Kievan Rus'.

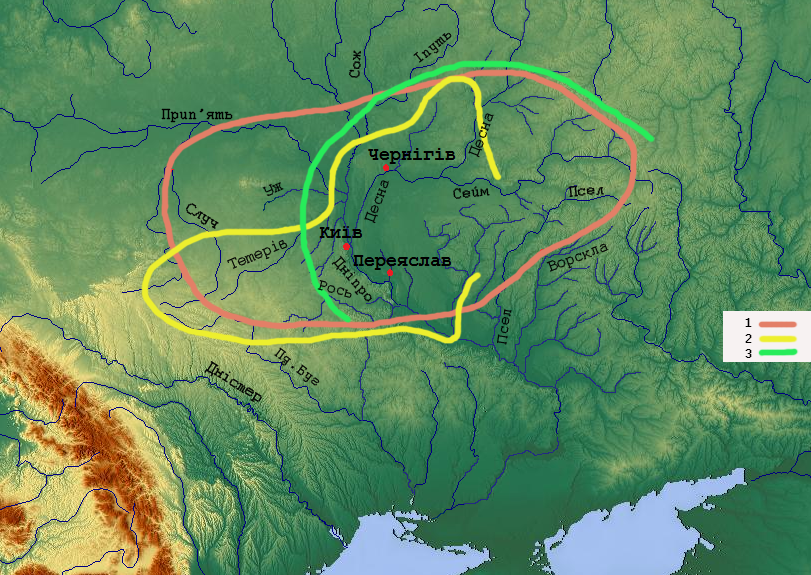
Rus' land/Ruthenia in the core sense.: 1. According to Petro Tolochko; 2. According to A. M. Nasonov; 3. According to Boris Rybakov

In a narrow sense, the term Rus' land (Ukrainian: Руська земля, romanized: Rus'ka zemlia) referred to the region of Central Dnieper Ukraine encompassing the areas around Kiev, Chernigov, and Pereyaslav. In a broader sense, this name also referred to all territories under control of Kievan princes, and the initial area of Rus' land served as their metropole, yet this wider meaning declined when Kiev lost its power over majority of principalities. After the Mongol Invasion of Kievan Rus' and a massive devastation of the core territory, the name Rus' was succeeded by Galician-Volhynian principality, which declared itself as Kingdom of Rus'.

European manuscripts dating from the 11th century used the name Ruthenia or Ruthenorum to describe people from Rus', the wider area occupied by the early Rus' (commonly referred to as Kievan Rus'). This term was also used to refer to the Slavs of the island of Rügen or to other Baltic Slavs, whom 12th-century chroniclers portrayed as fierce pirate pagans—even though Kievan Rus' had converted to Christianity by the 10th century: Eupraxia, the daughter of Rutenorum rex Vsevolod I of Kiev, had married the Holy Roman Emperor Henry IV in 1089. After the devastating Mongolian occupation of the main part of Ruthenia which began in the 13th century, western Ruthenian principalities became incorporated into the Grand Duchy of Lithuania, after which the state became called the Grand Duchy of Lithuania and Ruthenia. The Polish Kingdom also took the title King of Ruthenia when it annexed Galicia. These titles were merged when the Polish–Lithuanian Commonwealth was formed. A small part of Rus' (Transcarpathia, now mainly a part of Zakarpattia Oblast in present-day Ukraine), became subordinated to the Kingdom of Hungary in the 11th century. The Kings of Hungary continued using the title "King of Galicia and Lodomeria" until 1918.

== Late Middle Ages ==
By the 15th century, the Moscow principality had established its sovereignty over a large portion of former Kievan territory and began to fight Lithuania over Ruthenian lands. In 1547, the Moscow principality adopted the title of The Great Principat of Moscow and Tsardom of the Whole Rus and claimed sovereignty over "all the Rus'" — acts not recognized by its neighbour Poland. The Muscovy population was Eastern Orthodox and preferred to use the Greek transliteration Rossiya (Ῥωσία) rather than the Latin "Ruthenia".

In the 14th century, the southern territories of Rus', including the principalities of Galicia–Volhynia and Kiev, became part of the Grand Duchy of Lithuania, which in 1384 united with Catholic Poland in a union which became the Polish–Lithuanian Commonwealth in 1569. Due to their usage of the Latin script rather than the Cyrillic script, they were usually denoted by the Latin name Ruthenia. Other spellings were also used in Latin, English, and other languages during this period. Contemporaneously, the Ruthenian Voivodeship was established in the territory of Galicia-Volhynia and existed until the 18th century.

These southern territories include:

- Galicia–Volhynia or the Kingdom of Ruthenia (Ukrainian: Галичина-Волинь, romanized: Halychyna-Volyn or Ukrainian: Королівство Русь, romanized: Korolivstvo Rus; Polish: Królestwo Rusi or Księstwo Halicko-Wołyńskie)
- Galicia (Ukrainian: Галичина, romanized: Halychyna or Галицько-Волинська Русь, Halytsko-Volynska Rus; Polish: Ruś Halicka)
- White Ruthenia, (eastern part of modern Belarus; Belarusian: Белая Русь, romanized: Biełaja Ruś; Polish: Ruś Biała)
- Black Ruthenia (a western part of modern Belarus; Belarusian: Чорная Русь, romanized: Čornaja Ruś Polish: Ruś Czarna)
- Red Ruthenia, or Galicia, western Ukraine and southeast Poland; (Ukrainian: Червона Русь, romanized: Chervona Rus; Polish: Ruś Czerwona)
- Carpathian Ruthenia (Ukrainian: Карпатська Русь, romanized: Karpatska Rus; Polish: Ruś Podkarpacka, lit. 'Subcarpathian Ruthenia')

The Russian Tsardom was officially called Velikoye Knyazhestvo Moskovskoye (Великое Княжество Московское), the Grand Duchy of Moscow, until 1547, although Ivan III (1440–1505, r. 1462–1505) had earlier borne the title "Great Tsar of All Russia".

== Early modern period ==
During the early modern period, the term Ruthenia started to be mostly associated with the Ruthenian lands of the Polish Crown and the Cossack Hetmanate. Bohdan Khmelnytsky declared himself the ruler of the Ruthenian state to the Polish representative Adam Kysil in February 1649.

The Grand Principality of Ruthenia was the project name of the Cossack Hetmanate integrated into the Polish–Lithuanian–Ruthenian Commonwealth.

== Modern period ==
=== Ukraine ===
The use of the term Rus' in the lands of Rus' survived longer as a name used by Ukrainians for Ukraine. When the Austrian monarchy made the vassal state of Galicia–Lodomeria into a province in 1772, Habsburg officials realized that the local East Slavic people were distinct from both Poles and Russians and still called themselves Rusyny (Ruthenians). This was true until the empire fell in 1918.

In the 1880s through the first decade of the 20th century, the popularity of the ethnonym Ukrainian spread, and the term Ukraine became a substitute for Malaya Rus' among the Ukrainian population of the empire. In the course of time, the term Rus became restricted to western parts of present-day Ukraine (Galicia/Halych, Carpathian Ruthenia), an area where Ukrainian nationalism competed with Galician Russophilia.

Rusyn (the Ruthenian) has been an official self-identification of the Rus' population in Poland (and also in Czechoslovakia). Until 1939, for many Ruthenians and Poles, the word Ukrainiec (Ukrainian) meant a person involved in or friendly to a nationalist movement.

=== Modern Ruthenia ===
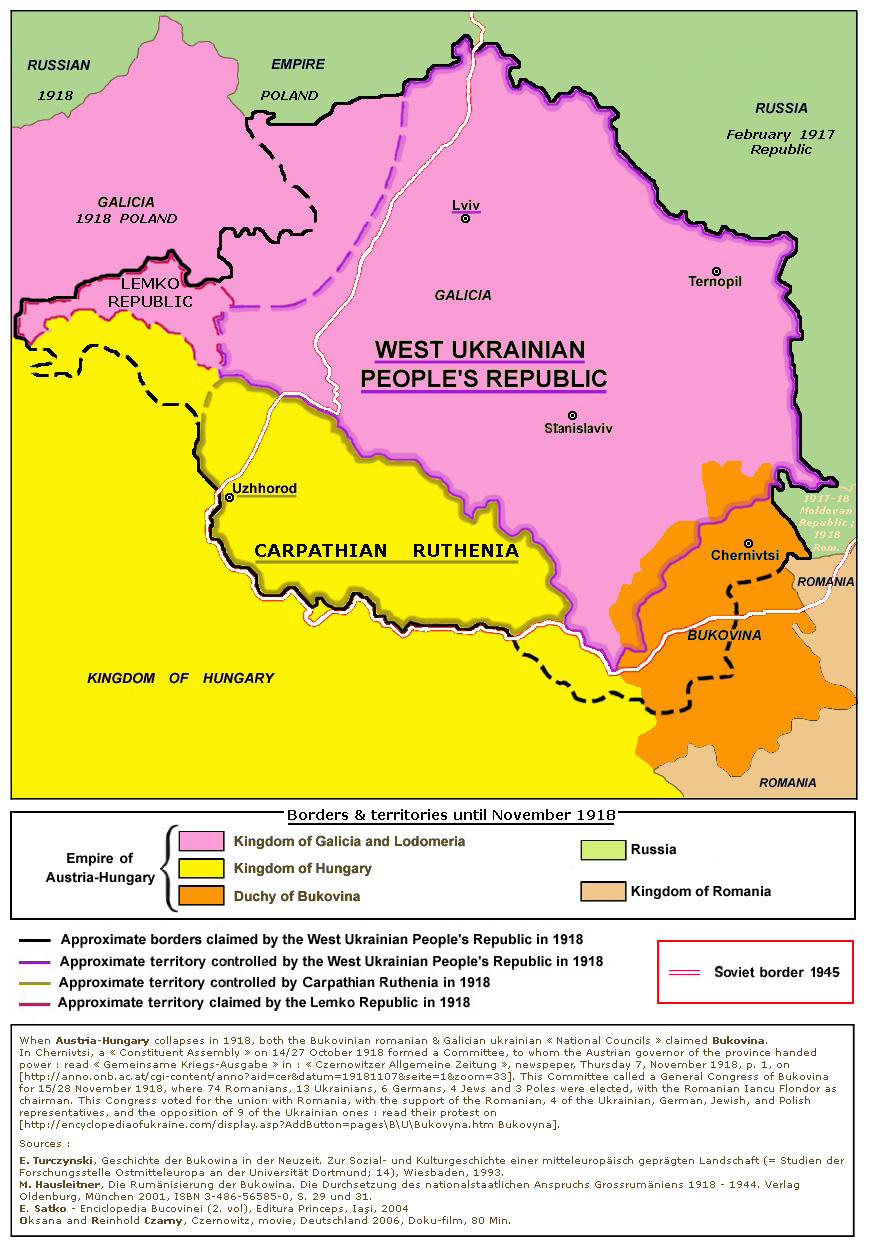
Map of the areas claimed and controlled by the Carpathian Ruthenia, the Lemko Republic and the West Ukrainian People's Republic in 1918

Autonomous Subcarpathian Ruthenia and independent Carpatho-Ukraine 1938–1939.

After 1918, the name Ruthenia became narrowed to the area south of the Carpathian Mountains in the Kingdom of Hungary, also called Carpathian Ruthenia (Ukrainian: карпатська Русь, romanized: karpatska Rus, including the cities of Mukachevo, Uzhhorod, and Prešov) and populated by Carpatho-Ruthenians, a group of East Slavic highlanders. While Galician Ruthenians considered themselves Ukrainians, the Carpatho-Ruthenians were the last East Slavic people who kept the historical name (Ruthen is a Latin form of the Slavic rusyn). Today, the term Rusyn is used to describe the ethnicity and language of Ruthenians, who are not compelled to adopt the Ukrainian national identity.

Carpathian Ruthenia (Hungarian: Kárpátalja, Ukrainian: Закарпаття, romanized: Zakarpattia) became part of the newly founded Hungarian Kingdom in 1000. In May 1919, it was incorporated with nominal autonomy into Czechoslovakia as Subcarpathian Rus'. Since then, Ruthenian people have been divided into three orientations: Russophiles, who saw Ruthenians as part of the Russian nation; Ukrainophiles, who like their Galician counterparts across the Carpathian Mountains considered Ruthenians part of the Ukrainian nation; and Ruthenophiles, who claimed that Carpatho-Ruthenians were a separate nation and who wanted to develop a native Rusyn language and culture.

In 1938, under the Nazi regime in Germany, there were calls in the German press for the independence of a greater Ukraine, which would include Ruthenia, parts of Hungary, the Polish Southeast including Lviv, the Crimea, and Ukraine, including Kyiv and Kharkiv. (These calls were described in the French and Spanish press as "troublemaking".)

On 15 March 1939, the Ukrainophile president of Carpatho-Ruthenia, Avhustyn Voloshyn, declared its independence as Carpatho-Ukraine. On the same day, regular troops of the Royal Hungarian Army occupied and annexed the region. In 1944 the Red Army occupied the territory, and in 1945 it was annexed to the Ukrainian SSR. Rusyns were not an officially recognized ethnic group in the USSR, as the Soviet government considered them to be Ukrainian.

A Rusyn minority remained, after World War II, in eastern Czechoslovakia (now Slovakia). According to critics, the Ruthenians rapidly became Slovakized. In 1995 the Ruthenian written language became standardized.

Rusyns/Lemkos are recognized as a distinct minority separate from Ukrainians in Croatia, Hungary, Romania, Poland, Serbia, and Slovakia.

Following Ukrainian independence and dissolution of the Soviet Union (1990–91), the official position of the government and some Ukrainian politicians has been that the Rusyns are an integral part of the Ukrainian nation. Some of the population of Zakarpattia Oblast of Ukraine have identified as Rusyn (or Boyko, Hutsul, Lemko etc.) first and foremost and hold varying positions on whether or not Rusyns are part of a broader Ukrainian national identity.

== Gallery ==
Ruthenia and Kievan domains during Askold and Dir and Oleg the Wise (862–912)

Principalities of Kievan Rus' (1054–1132)

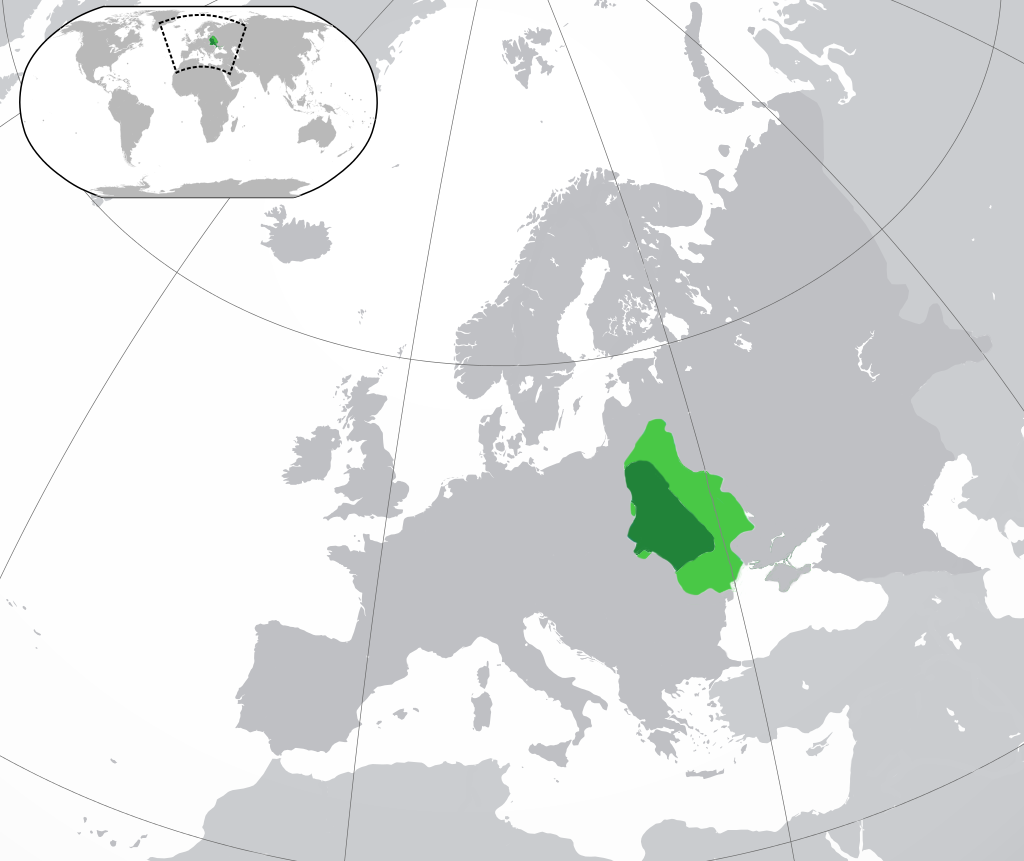
Kingdom of Ruthenia (13th-14th century)

Ruthenian Voivoideship (14th-18th century)

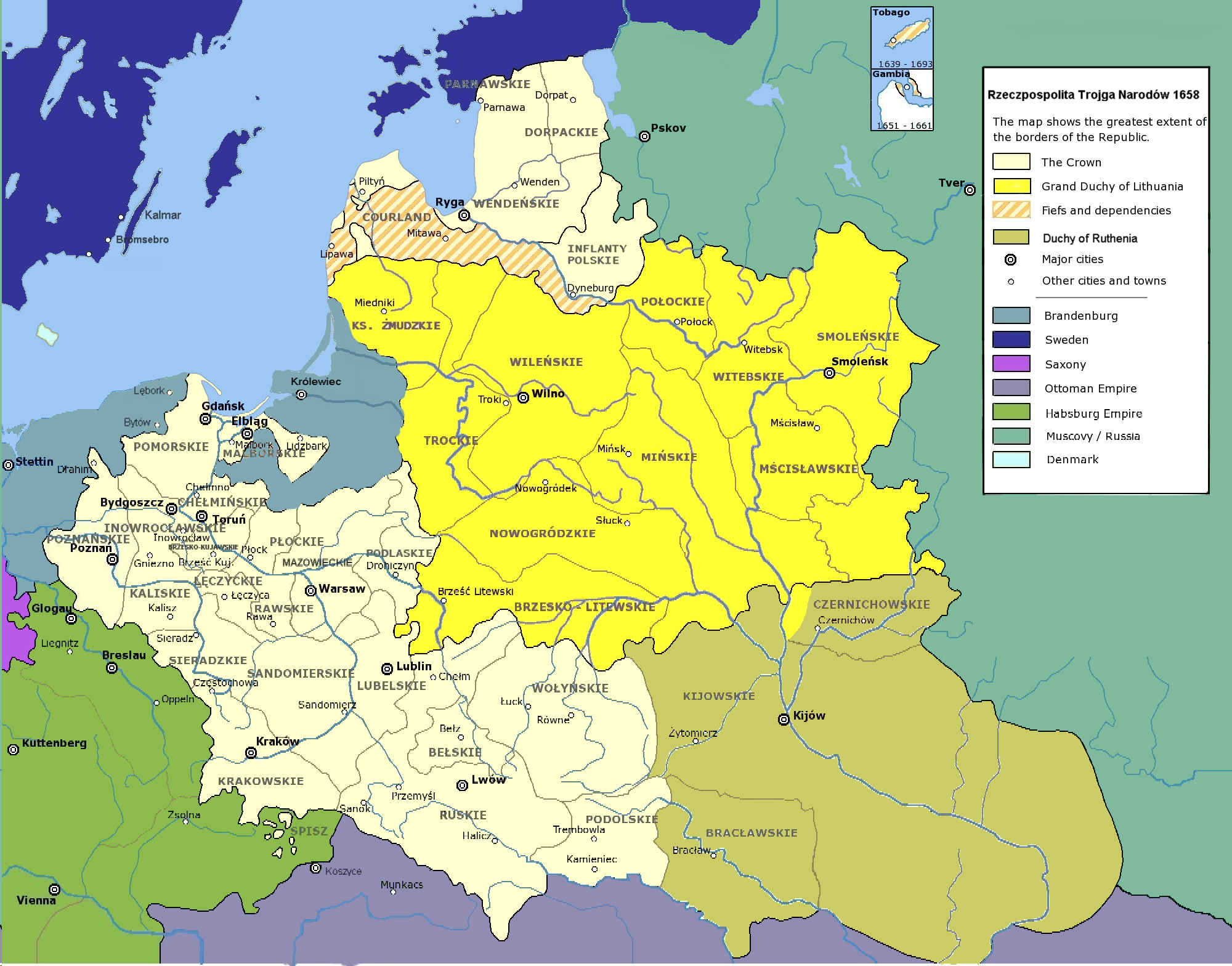
Grand Principality of Ruthenia shown in dark yellow (1658 project)

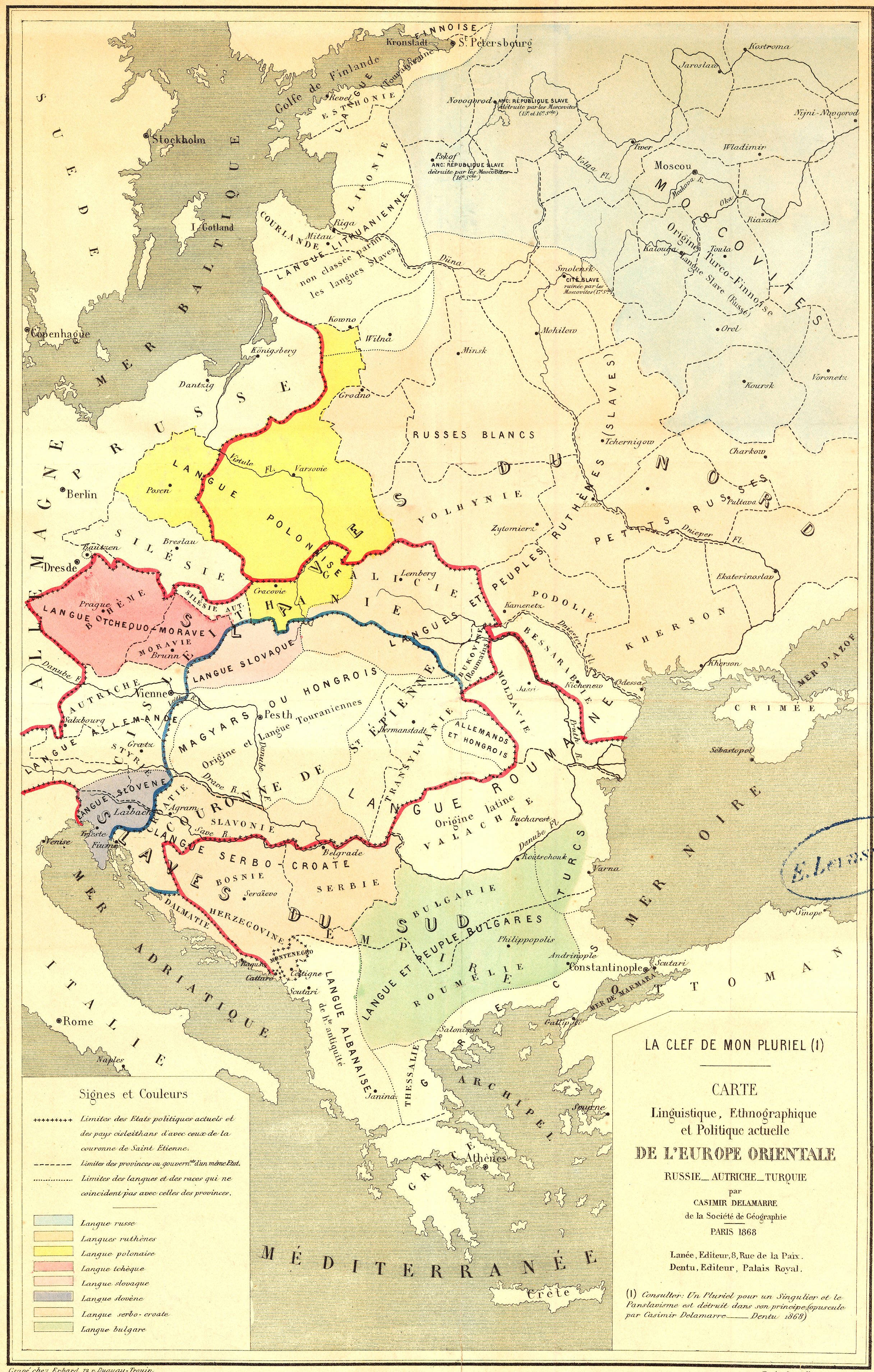
"ruthenian languages and people" mentioned in the linguistic and political map of Eastern Europe by Casimir Delamarre (1868)

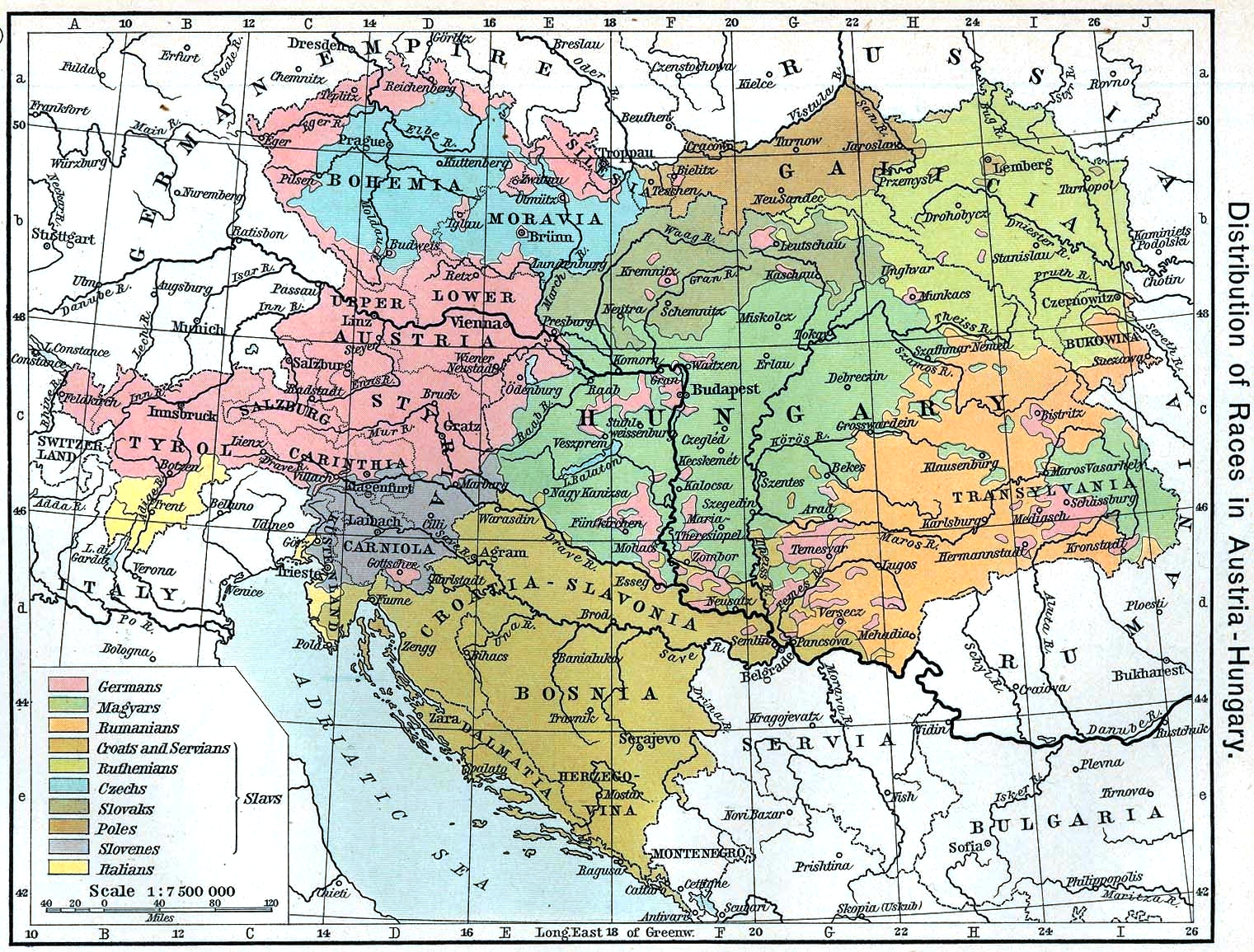
1911 map of Austro-Hungary showing ethnic Ruthenians in light-green in eastern Galicia

== See also ==
- Grand Principality of Ruthenia
- Ruthenian Voivodeship
- Names of Rusʹ, Russia and Ruthenia
- Polish–Lithuanian–Ruthenian Commonwealth
- Kingdom of Ruthenia
- Ruthenian (disambiguation)
- Ruthenian nobility
- Gente Ruthenus, natione Polonus
- Polish National Government (January Uprising)
- Lemkos
