= Jerzy Niemirycz =

Polish-Lithuanian magnate and politician

Yuri Nemyrych (Ukrainian: Юрій Стефанович Немирич, 1612–1659) or Jerzy Niemirycz was a Polish-Lithuanian magnate and politician of Ruthenian stock (gente Ruthenus natione Polonus) and Cossack Hetmanate official and diplomat.

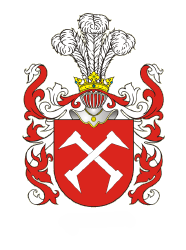
Coat of arms

== Biography ==
Yuri Nemyrych was born in Ovruch, Kiev Voivodeship (Polesia region) in 1612 during the Polish-Lithuanian intervention in Muscovy, the oldest son of wealthy Polish-Lithuanian Anti-Trinitarian noble family, Klamry coat of arms. His father was a podkomorzy of Kiev Stefan Niemirycz (died 1630) and his mother was Maria Wojnarowska, (died 1632). He studied at the Racovian Academy in Raków, Kielce County, then in Leiden, and travelled across Western and Southern Europe, and then back at Leiden. He has shown great interest in politics, evidenced by his work Discursus de bello Moscovitico, written in 1633 and dedicated to his uncle and fellow Polish Brethren Roman Hojski. Upon his return home, Polish–Lithuanian Commonwealth, in 1634, he was already a well-educated lower level magnate and aspiring Polish-Ruthenian politician (gente Ruthenus natione Polonus), and a model noble citizen. He took part in the wars against Russia (Smolensk War) and Sweden (Treaty of Stuhmsdorf). At the end of hostilities he married Calvinist Elżbieta Słupecka, who connected him with them most prominent noble Protestant families of Polish–Lithuanian Commonwealth. In 1636 Kiev voivodeship nobility elected him a judge to the Crown Tribunal (Trybunał Koronny) in Lublin. He performance as a judge found him more favour with his electorate, for in 1637 he was elected to the parliament (Sejm) where he presided for many years. He also became a podkomorzy (chamberlain) of Kiev and exerted significant influence in the Polish–Lithuanian Commonwealth politics. He worked to enhance his family fortune, centred in Horoszki, and through acquisitions and other means his estates grew to include 14 cities and 50 villages with 7600 serfs, so by 1648 he had the second largest territory in Ukraine, after the Wiśniowiecki family.

A Polish Brethren, Nemyrych defended his fellow Arians in court and in parliament in the 1640s, and supported a fellow Protestant George II Rákóczi as candidate for the Polish-Lithuanian throne in 1648, when king Władysław IV Vasa died in the mist of war. Because of the Cossack Uprising of 1648 he had to evacuate his family to Warsaw, and took limited part in fighting against the rebellious Cossacks and serfs, advocating moderation (along the lines of Kiev voivode Adam Kisiel). He returned to his estates in 1649 but the massacre of Polish army by the Cossacks and Crimean Tatars at Batoh (Battle of Batih) in 1652 forced him to evacuate again, this time to his estates in Volhynia. During the Deluge, like many Polish–Lithuanian nobles and magnates (both Catholic and Protestant), he embraced the Swedish invaders in 1655, clearly in hopes of improving the Protestant position in the Commonwealth and reconquering his estates in the Ukrainian palatines. His pleadings for improvement of Polish Brethren cause with the Swedish king Charles X Gustav of Sweden failed and he eventually switched side to the Cossacks side. He took place in the preparation of the Treaty of Radnot (partition of the Polish–Lithuanian Commonwealth amongst five signatories: Charles X Gustav, György Rákóczi II of Transylvania, Frederick William, Elector of Brandenburg, Bohdan Khmelnytsky, and Bogusław Radziwiłł), signed in 1656. In 1657 he moved to Cossack Ukraine and Cossack hetman Khmelnytsky had his estates restored to him. He supported Ivan Vyhovsky, as Khmelnytsky's successor, and signed in Korsun, jointly with Ivan Bohun and Ivan Kovalivsky, an agreement between Sweden and Cossack Hetmanate in 1657.

During that time, when he envisioned a semi-independent duchy of Ukraine as a new element of Polish–Lithuanian Commonwealth and where there was no place for a Polish Brethren statesman, Nemirycz decided to convert to Orthodoxy and he encouraged his fellow Polish Brethren to do the same in an infamous (Skrypt), Exhortation to all Dissidents from the Romish Religion to Take Refuge in the Bosom of the Greek Church. He was a co-author of the Treaty of Hadiach, signed in 1658, which established the Grand Duchy of Ruthenia, transforming the Polish–Lithuanian Commonwealth into the Polish–Lithuanian–Ruthenian Commonwealth. He drafted the treaty, and, as the Chancellor of the Grand Duchy of Ruthenia, headed the Ukrainian delegation to the Polish–Lithuanian parliamentary session for ratification, where it was ratified. In 1659 the Muscovite Tsardom refused to accept the new Commonwealth and invaded Ukraine, but Russian army was defeated at the battle of Konotop, but through conspiracies, betrayals, and money Russian achieved the cancellation of Vyhovsky’s hetman position by the Cossacks of Black Council of 1663, and caused a rebellion of the serfs and pro-Russian Cossacks and these rebels killed Yuri Nemyrych in a minor engagement, allegedly he was stabbed 70 times in the chest. Thus ingloriously died a statesman, whom Moscow named the greatest heretic and outlaw.

== Family ==
He and his sole wife Elżbieta Słupecka, Rawa coat of arms, (died 1660) had three children: Tomasz (died young), Barbara (she had two husbands), and finally Teodor Nemyrych (1648–1700), who finally restored family estates but never achieved any prominence and whose family converted to Roman Catholicism.

== See also ==
- Perevolochna
