= Ivan Bezpaly =

Cossack colonel (died 1718)

Ivan Bezpaly (Ukrainian Іван Безпалий, Russian Иван Беспалый, d. 1718) was a Cossack colonel of the Uman Regiment, and the leader of the pro-Russian faction in the Eastern Ukraine. He briefly served as the acting Hetman of Ukraine, elected by a limited group of left-bank Ukraine Cossacks loyal to the Tsardom of Russia, his hetmanship lasting from November 1658 to October 1659.

He fought on the Russian side in the campaign of voyevodas Romodanovsky and Trubetskoy. Bezpaly took part in the Battle of Konotop (he commanded a regiment of around 7,000 Cossacks) in which the Russian forces and their allies were defeated. In the second Rada of Pereyaslav he voluntarily stepped down as Hetman to make place for Yuri Khmelnytsky who reached his majority age. Bezpalyi was elected as military judge. He became a monk in later life.
