= Helena Stetkiewicz =

Ukrainian politician; wife of Ivam Vyhovsky

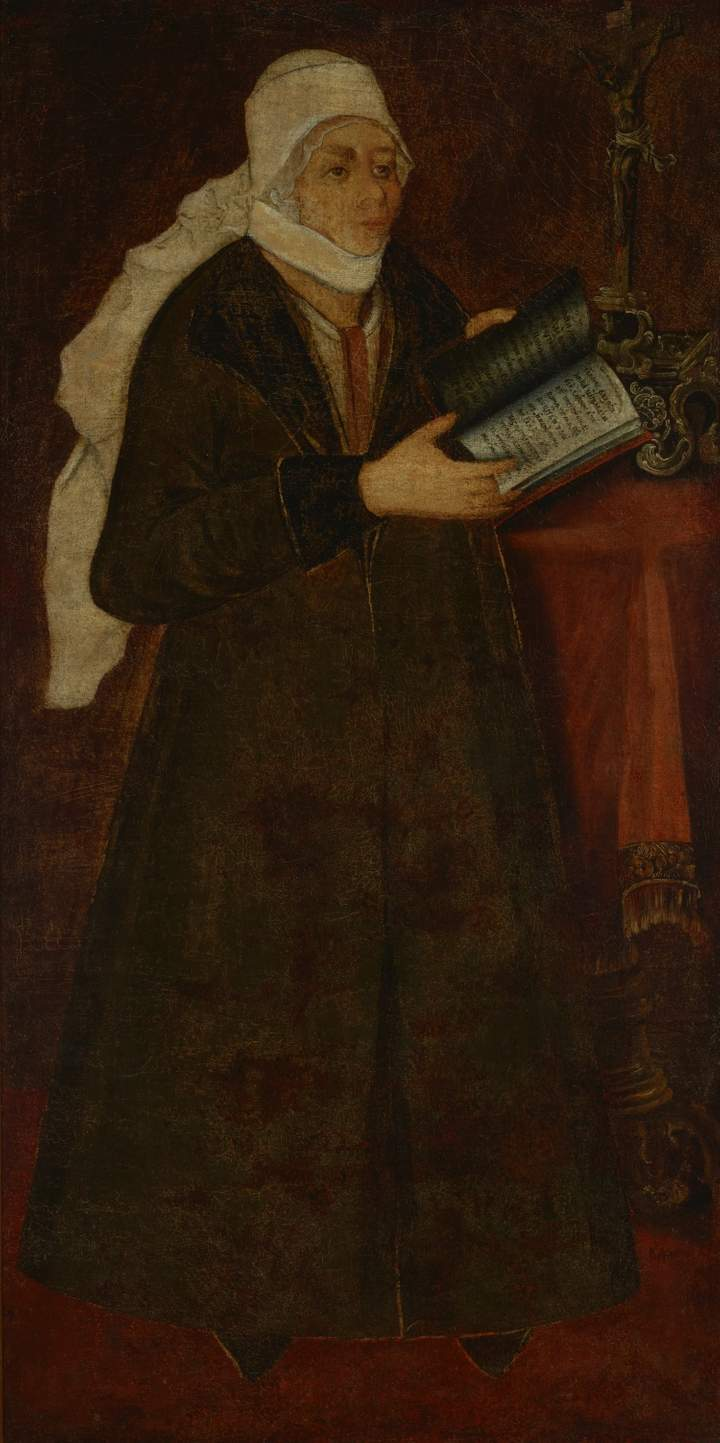
- Portrait, 17th century
- Died: 1664; Chyhyryn
- Spouse: Ivan Vyhovsky

Helena Stetkiewicz or Olena Vyhovska (Ukrainian: Олена Виговська; died 1664) was the second wife of Ivan Vyhovsky, the hetman of the Zaporozhian Host (1657–1659) in the Cossack Hetmanate.

== Life ==
Helena Stetkiewicz was the daughter of Bohdan Stetkiewicz, a Lithuanian castellan of Nowogródek (Navahrudak) and Mścisław (Mstsislaw). Her mother, Helena Sołomierecka, was a Ruthenian duchess (knyazhna) of Rurikid stock tracing her lineage to the Principality of Smolensk.

After marriage, the couple lived in Subotiv and Kyiv.

She married Hetman Ivan Vyhovsky.

Helena was an influential figure among the Ukrainian Cossacks. She is known to have participated in politics as an adviser and collaborator of her spouse during his reign.

After the murder of Ivan Vyhovsky, Helena moved to the town of Ruda in the Ruthenian Voivodeship (today a village in Lviv Oblast) where she reburied her husband and died soon after. However, there is version of the story that holds that the couple is buried in the Manyava Skete in Carpathian Mountains.

== Gallery ==
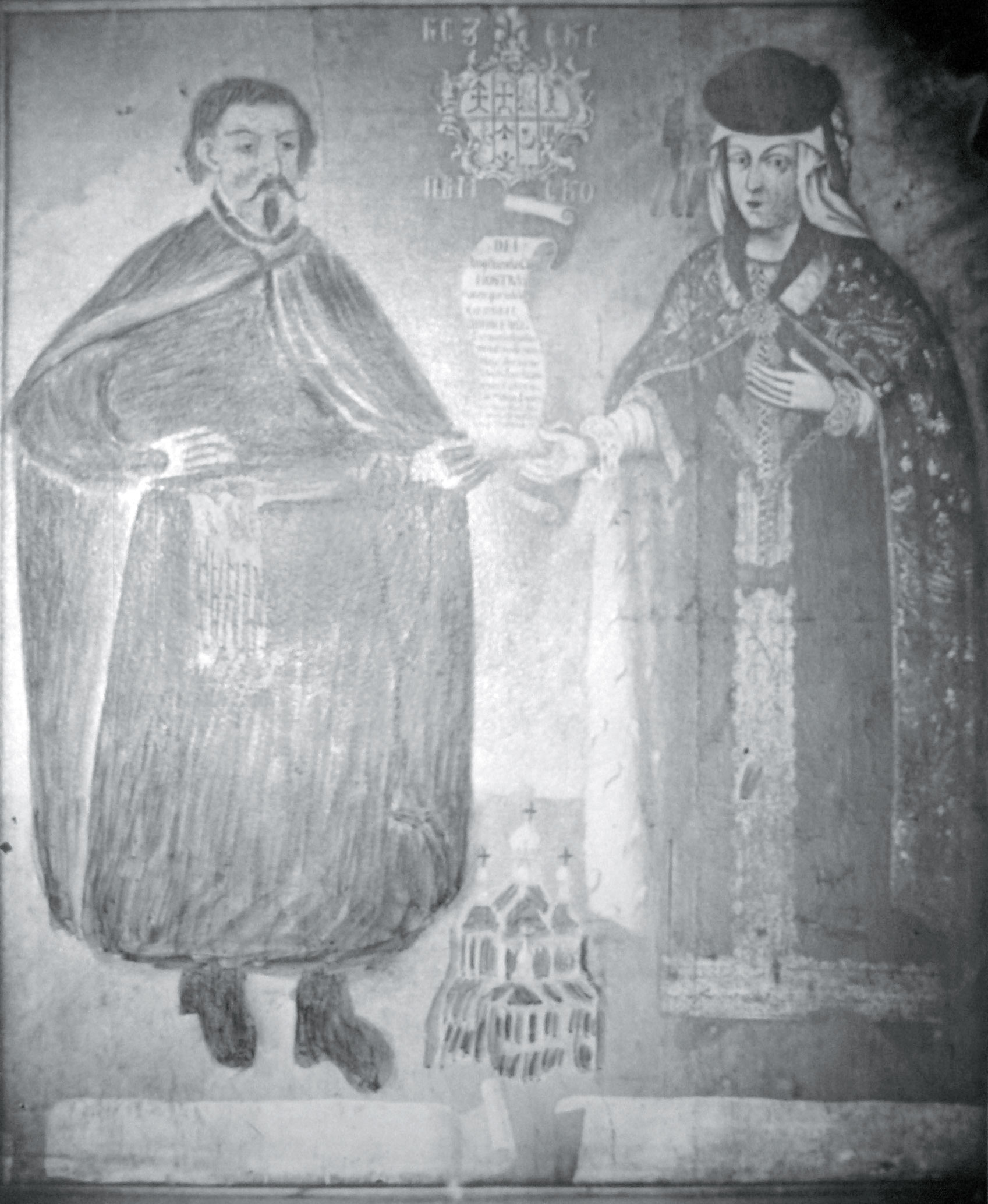
Parents of Helena Stetkiewicz

Kościesza coat of arms
