= Battle of Konotop =

1659 Russo-Cossack-Tatar battle

- Part of Russo-Polish War (1654–1667) and The Ruin
Date	9 July 1659 [O.S. 29 June 1659]
Location	Konotop, Ukraine 51°13′21″N 33°09′31″E
Result	Victory of Vyhovsky's coalition

Belligerents
Crimean Khanate; Cossacks of Ivan Vyhovsky; Polish–Lithuanian Commonwealth	Russian Tsardom; Cossacks of Ivan Bezpaly

Commanders and leaders
Mehmed IV Giray (Note: Army Commander); Ivan Vyhovsky (Note: The creator of the alliance); Ivan Bohun; Hryhoriy Hulyanytsky (Polish–Lithuanian Commonwealth) Krzysztof Łaski (Note: The commander of the Polish troops in battle)	Alexey Trubetskoy (Note: Army Commander); Semyon Pozharsky (executed) (Note: Commander of the advanced regiment); Semyon Lvov (POW) (Note: Also the commander of the advanced regiment); Ivan Bezpaly (Note: Commander of the secondary Cossack corps)

Strength
58,000; 30,000–35,000; 20,000 (Note: 16,000 land army and 4,000 garrison troops in Konotop); (Polish–Lithuanian Commonwealth) 3,000	35,260; 28,600; 6,660

Casualties and losses
7,000 to 10,000; 3,000–6,000; 4,000	6,769; 4,769; 2,000
- Location within Ukraine Battle of Konotop (European Russia)

The Battle of Konotop or Battle of Sosnivka was fought between a coalition led by the Hetman of Zaporizhian Cossacks Ivan Vyhovsky and cavalry units of the Russian Tsardom under the command of Semyon Pozharsky and Semyon Lvov, supported by Cossacks of Ivan Bezpaly, on 29 June 1659, near the town of Konotop, Ukraine, during the Russo-Polish War (1654–1667). Vyhovsky's coalition defeated the Russians and their allies and forced the main Russian army to interrupt the siege of Konotop. However, the result of the battle only intensified political tensions in Ukraine and led to Vyhovsky's removal from power several months later.

== Prelude ==
The Battle of Konotop took place during the period of Ukrainian history that is generally referred to as the Ruin. This was the time after the death of Hetman Bohdan Khmelnytsky, during which many power struggles within the Cossack elite took place. Arguably, these power struggles were instigated by the Russian tsar, in an effort to undermine the authority of the Cossacks.

During his reign, Bohdan Khmelnytsky managed to wrestle Ukraine out of Polish domination, but was later forced to enter into a new and uneasy relation with Russia in 1654. His successor, general chancellor and close adviser Ivan Vyhovsky, was left to deal with Moscow's growing interference in Ukraine's internal affairs and even overt instigation of a civil war by way of supporting Cossack factions opposing Vyhovsky.

In 1656, Russia signed a peace accord in Vilno with Poland in violation of the Treaty of Pereyaslav of 1654, and increased pressure on the Cossack Hetmanate. As a result, Vyhovsky entered into negotiations with the Poles, and concluded the Treaty of Hadiach on 16 September 1658. Under the planned new treaty three voyevodships of central Ukraine (Kiev, Bratslav and Podilya) were to become an equal constituent nation of the Polish–Lithuanian Commonwealth along with Poland and Lithuania under the name of Grand Principality of Rus', forming the Polish–Lithuanian–Ruthenian Commonwealth. However, the Sejm ratified the treaty in a very limited version, where the idea of an independent Ruthenian Principality was completely abandoned.

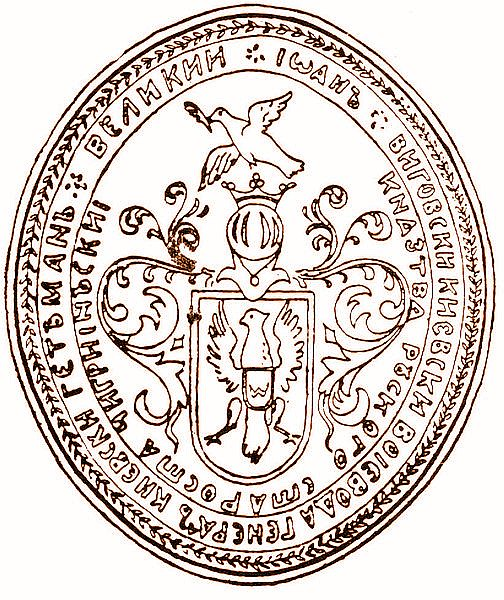
Seal of Grand hetman Principality of Rus Ivan Vyhovsky

The news of a Cossack-Polish alliance alarmed Moscow and the Ukrainian cossacks opposing Vyhovsky (led by Ivan Bezpaly) to the extent that an expeditionary force was dispatched to Ukraine in the autumn of 1658 headed by Prince Grigory Romodanovsky. Moscow's military commander not only supported the election by Vyhovsky's opponents of a new rival hetman, but started actively to occupy towns held by Vyhovsky's supporters. Ukrainian chronicles state that part of the cities were destroyed and there were cases of widespread looting of civilians. This point of view is criticized by modern historians, who show that the chroniclers could not have witnessed such events because they did not live at that time. Russia reports indicate that there were deaths among the civilian population, since the Russians were forced to storm cities where Cossacks mixed with the population, and sometimes they themselves resisted, as well as the statement about "completely cut out cities", such as Sribnoe, is considered overstated.

The situation having escalated that far, open hostilities followed. Skirmishes and attacks occurred in different towns and regions throughout the country, the most prominent of which was the capture of Konotop by Cossacks of the Nizhyn and Chernihiv Regiments headed by Hryhoriy Hulyanytsky, a colonel of Nizhyn. In the spring of 1659 a Russian army of 28,600 men according to documents of Razryadny prikaz or 100,000–150,000 according to "The Сhronicle of the Witness" and Sergey Solovyov was dispatched to Ukraine to assist Romodanovsky. The latter numbers are being criticized by modern historians as exaggerated.

The army came to the Ukrainian border on 30 January 1659 and stood 40 days till Trubetskoy negotiated with Vyhovsky since the Russian commander had instructions to persuade the Cossacks. Vyhovsky's rivals, the Cossack forces of commanders Bezpalyi, Voronko and the Zaporizhian Cossacks of Barabash joined the Russian troops. After the negotiations failed, hostilities began. The Russian army together with anti-Vyhovsky insurgents defeated Vyhovsky's troops in the battles of Romny and Lokhvytsia. After that, the supreme military commander Prince Aleksey Trubetskoy decided to finish off the small 4,000 garrison of Konotop Castle held by Cossacks of Hulyanytsky before proceeding in his pursuit of Vyhovsky.

== Siege of Konotop ==
Prince Trubetskoy's hopes for a quick resolution of the Konotop stand-off were dimmed when Hulyanytsky and his Cossacks refused to betray hetman Vyhovsky and mounted a fierce and protracted defence of Konotop with only 4,000 Cossacks. According to a historian Markevych, on 21 April 1659, after a morning prayer, Trubetskoy ordered an all-out assault on the fortress's fortifications. The city was shelled, a few incendiary bombs were dropped inside, and the army moved on to capture the city. At one point Trubetskoy's troops broke inside the city walls, but were repelled by the fierce resistance of the Cossacks inside. After the fiasco of the initial assault, Trubetskoy abandoned his plans of a quick assault and proceeded to shell the city and to fill the moat with earth. The Cossacks stubbornly held on in spite of all the fire unleashed on the city: during the night, the earth filled into the moat was used to strengthen the city walls, and the besieged even undertook several counterattacks on Trubetskoy's besieging army. These attacks forced Prince Trubetskoy to move his military camp 10 km away from the city and thereby split his forces between the main army at his headquarters and the army besieging Konotop. Another attack on 29 April was also repelled and the Russians lost close to 400 men and suffered around 3000 wounded. Instead of a quick campaign the siege dragged on for 70 days and gave Vyhovsky the much-needed time to prepare for the battle with the Russian army.

The hetman not only managed to organize his own troops, but secured support of his allies – the Crimean Tatars and the Poles. By agreement with the Tatars, the Khan Mehmed IV Giray, at the head of his 30,000-strong army, made his way towards Konotop in early summer of 1659, as did the 4000-man Polish detachment with the support of Serbian, Moldavian and German mercenaries.

== Battle ==
By 24 June 1659 Vyhovsky and his allies approached the area and defeated a small reconnaissance detachment of the invader's army near the village of Shapovalivka, several kilometers south-west of Konotop. According to the plan made that evening, the 30,000 Tatars were left in an ambush south-east of the river Sosnivka, and Vyhovsky's forces with Poles and mercenaries were positioned at the village of Sosnivka, south of the river with the same name.

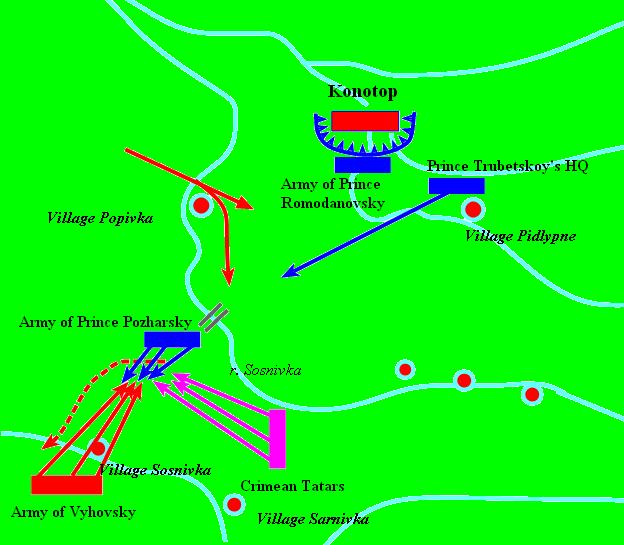
Battle map

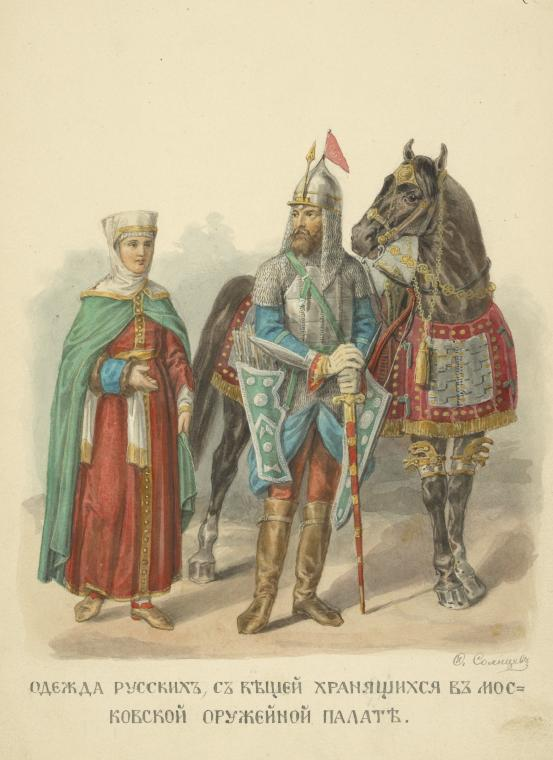
Russian cavalryman of the 17th century

Meanwhile, Vyhovsky left the command of his forces to the brother of Hryhoriy Hulyanytsky, Stepan Hulyanytsky, and at the head of a small Cossack detachment left for Konotop. Early on the morning of 27 June 1659, Vyhovsky's detachment attacked Trubetskoy's army near Konotop, and using this sudden and unexpected attack managed to capture a sizable number of the enemy's horses and drive them away and further into the steppe. The enemy counterattacked, and Vyhovsky retreated across the bridge to the other bank of the Sosnivka river in the direction of his camp. Having learned of the assault, Prince Trubetskoy dispatched a detachment of 4,000 men noble cavalry and 2,000 Bezpalyi Cossacks led by Prince Semen Pozharsky across the river to pursue Ivan Vyhovsky. Trubetskoy's forces were thus divided between this detachment and those besieging Konotop. According to the Chronicle of the Eyewitness and Solovyov the detachment of Pozharsky consisted of 30,000 men.

On 28 June 1659 Prince Semen Pozharsky, in his pursuit of the Cossacks, crossed the river Sosnivka and made his camp on the southern bank of the river. During the night a small Cossack detachment led by Stepan Hulyanytsky, having padded the hoofs of their horses with cloth, stole under the cover of night behind the enemy lines and captured the bridge that Pozharsky had used to cross the river. The bridge was dismantled and the river dammed, thus flooding the valley around it.

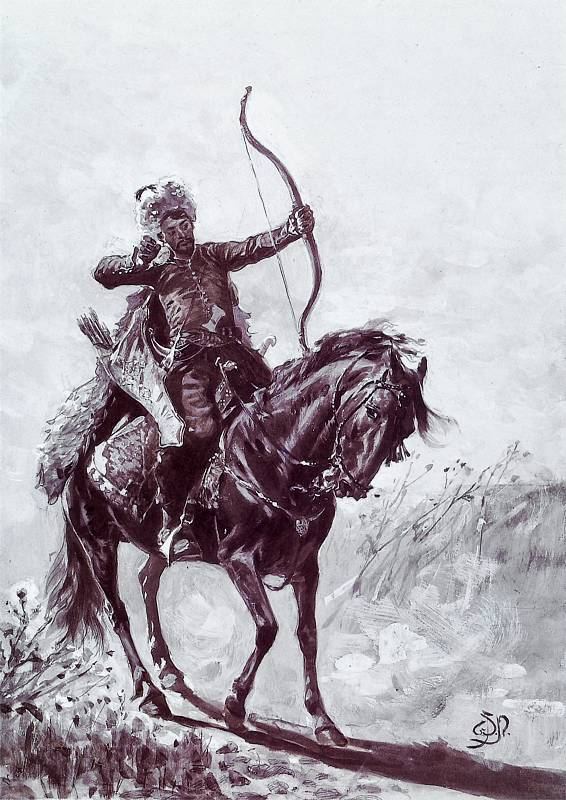
Tatar archer

Early on the morning of 29 June 1659 Vyhovsky, at the head of a small detachment, attacked Prince Pozharsky's army. After a little skirmish, he started to retreat, feigning a disorganized flight in the direction of his main forces. The unsuspecting Pozharsky ordered his army to pursue the enemy. Once the enemy's army entered Sosnivka, the Cossacks fired three cannon shots to give the signal to the Tatars and counterattacked with all the forces stationed at Sosnivka. Having discovered the trap, Prince Semen Pozharsky ordered retreat; but his heavy cavalry got bogged down in the soggy ground created from the flooding the night before. At this moment the Tatars also advanced from the eastern flank, and the outright slaughter ensued. Almost all troops perished, with few of them captured alive. Among the captured were Prince Semen Romanovich Pozharsky himself, Prince Semen Petrovich Lvov, both Princes Buturlins, Prince Lyapunov, Prince Skuratov, Prince Kurakin and others. A relative of the Great Liberator of Moscow from the Poles, Dmitry Pozharsky, Prince Semen Romanovich Pozharsky was brought before the Khan of Crimea Mehmed IV Giray. Being forced to carry out acts of submissiveness Pozharsky insulted the Khan and spat in his face. For that he was promptly beheaded by the Tatars, and his severed head was dispatched with one of the captives to Prince Trubetskoy's camp.

Having learned about the defeat of Pozharsky's army, Trubetskoy ordered the siege of Konotop lifted and started his retreat from Ukraine. At that moment the Cossacks of Hulyanytsky inside the fortress emerged from behind the walls and attacked the retreating army. Trubetskoy lost, in addition, most of his artillery, his military banners and the treasury. The retreating army defended well and Vyhovsky and the Tatars abandoned their 3-day long pursuit near the Russian border.

== Aftermath and significance ==
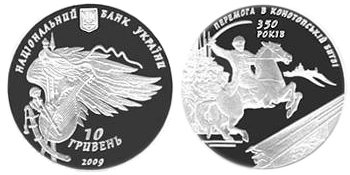
Commemorative coin of ₴10 issued for the 350th anniversary of the Battle of Konotop

As Trubetskoy's troops arrived in Putivl, the news of the battle reached Moscow as well. A prominent Russian historian of the 19th century, Sergey Solovyov, described it this way:

The bloom of Moscow's cavalry, troops that happily accomplished campaigns of year 54 and 55 have perished in one day – the victors got only about 5000 captive. The unfortunate were led onto an open space and slaughtered like lambs – that was the agreement between the Crimean Khan and the hetman of the Zaporozhian Cossacks! Never again was the tsar of Moscow able to master an army that strong. In mourning clothes showed himself Alexei Mikhailovich to the people and the terror seized Moscow. The blow was so hard because it was unexpected, and it followed such illustrious successes! It was only recently that Dolgoruki brought to Moscow a captured Lithuanian hetman, only recently was everyone talking about successes of Khovansky – and now Trubetskoy, for whom everyone had hopes higher than for others, and who was "a man devout and graceful, in military affairs skilled and a fright for a foe" – has ruined such a huge army! After capture of so many towns, after capture of the Lithuanian capital the royal city trembled for its own security: in August by tsar's decree people of all ranks hurried to build fortifications around Moscow. Often the tsar and the boyars were present themselves during the construction; people from outlying areas, their families with meagre belongings filled Moscow, and a rumour spread that the tsar was leaving to beyond the Volga and Yaroslavl.

Solovyev’s emotional description, however, is challenged by modern historians, who point to the fact that his judgement is true only in the sense that at least 259 of those lost in the battle were officers or men of Moscow rank, and that the Russian army was much smaller than Solovyov and other historians who followed Polish declarations believed it to be. The overall Russian casualties revealed by 17th-century archive documents of the Ambassadors’ Chancellery were 4,769 men: 2,830 of L’vov’s and Pozharskii’s forces sent across the Sosnovka and 1,896 lost during the attacks on Trubetskoy’s wagenburg. In a number of Polish and Ukrainian narrative sources the overall strength of the Russian army is estimated at 100,000–150,000 men, while its casualties are claimed to be 30,000–50,000, and it is declared that such prominent Russian commanders as Grigory Romodanovsky, Andrey Buturlin, Artamon Matveyev, and Venedikt Zmeyev all perished in the battle. These claims were uncritically accepted by 19th-century scholars, such as the aforementioned Sergey Solovyov, and are still popular among Ukrainian historians. For example, A. Bulvinsky concluded in his publication that both sides lost 40,000 men in the Battle of Konotop. These claims have been criticized in detail by Western and Russian historians as heavily exaggerated, the criticism has been supported by the Polish expert Piotr Kroll. It was noted that "judging by the marks on the sheets of the used documents from the Russian State Archive of Ancient Acts, [Bulvinsky] knew many Russian documents on the Konotop battle. However, he decided to use only one of them, one that has nothing to do with the battle of 28 June 1659". In order to have a 150,000-men-strong army at Konotop, Russia would have had to send all of its military forces to one place, leaving no troops behind, since the overall strength of the Russian armed forces according to the annual estimate of 1651 was 133,210 men in total, including 39,408 noblemen and boyars' sons, 44,486 streltsy troops, 21,124 Cossacks, 8,107 dragoons, 9113 Tatars, 2371 Ukrainians, 4245 artillerymen, 2707 foreigners, and Zasechnaya guard. Furthermore, documentary evidence makes it clear that Romodanovsky, Buturlin, Matveyev, and Zmeyev survived the battle and continued to serve the Russian Crown for many years. Instead of using narrative works, which don't cite any evidence, include dubious details and were used for propaganda purposes, Western and Russian scholars usually prefer 17th-century archive documents of the Russian Ambassadors’ Chancellery that provide detailed information on Russian regiments, their provision and losses. These documents are regarded as most reliable and accurate, as they were used in the interests of financial control and supply of the armed forces, carefully checked by a state commission and presented to the Tsar himself; attempts to distort the data were prohibited by law. When on one occasion Prince Ivan Lobanov-Rostovsky made an attempt to downplay his casualties in one of these documents, it was immediately noticed by the commission and perceived as an extraordinary offense by Tsar Alexis. In 2012, T. Tairova-Yakovleva urged historians not to regard the documentary evidence as the most reliable source on this matter, but her statement was criticized as completely ungrounded and absurd and her own interpretation of the battle as based on uncritical acceptance of non-Russian sources.

After the battle, the Ukrainian civil war of the Ruin ensued. Hetman Vyhovsky and his allies had only been able to capture a few of the Ukrainian towns held by his opponents, when the first bad news arrived: Cossacks of the Zaporozhian Host led by Ivan Sirko attacked Crimean outposts in the south, and Khan Giray was forced to leave him for his country. Several cities rebelled against Vyhovsky immediately: Lokhvytsia, Hadyach, Poltava, Romny. It was only 2 months after the battle when the citizens of Nizhyn gave a ceremonial welcome to Trubetskoy and swore an oath of allegiance to the Russian tsar. The same month the Ukrainian citizens and cossacks regiments in Kiev, Pereyaslav, Chernihiv swore an oath to the tsar as well.

Thus Vyhovsky was left to deal with the growing opposition to his rule. By the end of the year he was forced to resign and to flee to Poland where he was later executed by the Poles in 1664. His defeat is largely attributed to his alliance with the very unpopular Poles and his inability to seek support among all the strata of the Ukrainian population and not just among the rich Cossack elite, who were willing to betray him at every opportunity either to Moscow or Warsaw. The civil war raged on and the victors of the Konotop battle were soon forgotten.

Together with a number of other battles between East Slavs, such as Battle of Orsha, the Konotop battle was with a few exceptions an abandoned topic in Russian Imperial and in Soviet historiography. This attitude towards this event is explained by the fact that it dispelled some Russian propaganda positions about the unity of East Slavs, in particular the ones about "eternal friendship of Russian and Ukrainian peoples" and about "natural desire of Ukrainians for union with Russia". According to S. Makhun (writing on Reitar-military) for all the skill and the bravery of the Cossacks – especially those defending Konotop – it still remains a bitter victory. A victory that did not have any significant impact on the course of Ukrainian history, where the fratricidal war of the Ruin and the personal ambitions of treacherous hetmans prevailed.

=== Art and music ===
Numerous poems and odes have been written about he battle by the Ukrainian poets Yar Slavutych, Olena Teliha, and P. Karpenko-Krynytsia.

Numerous historic songs about the battle also entered the repertoire of the blind itinerant musicians known as kobzars.

The composer and bandurist Hryhory Kytasty in 1966 composed a monumental work based on Ukrainian Cossack folk songs for soloists, male chorus and orchestra to commemorate the battle. Recordings of this work have been released by the Ukrainian Bandurist Chorus with the renowned Russian singer Michael Minsky and also by the Kiev symphony.

== Sources ==
- Babulin, Igor (2009a). Битва под Конотопом. 28 июля 1659 [The battle of Konotop. July 28, 1659] (in Russian). Цейхгауз. ISBN 978-5-9771-0099-1.
- Babulin I.B. "Wild dances" on field of Konotop, Reittarr. No. 23.
- Bulvinsky A. Konotopska bytva 1659 //Ukrainskyi istorychnyi zhurnal – 1998 #3 p. 76–83, #4 p. 33–42
- D., Mackenzie; W., Michael (1993). A History of Russia, the Soviet Union, and Beyond. Fourth Edition. California: Belmont. ISBN 0-534-17970-3..
- Makhun S. Battle of Konotop. Reittarr. No. 23.
- Mytsyk Y. Battle of Konotop 1659// Vijsko Ukrainy – 1996 #5–6, p. 30–33
- Mytsyk Y. Battle of Konotop 1659 // Materially naukovoyi konforentsiyi Konotops'ka bytva 1659 r. i yiyi znachennia v natsional'nomu postupi Ukrainy. – Kiev, 1996.
- Mytsyk Y. Polkovodtsi Vijska Zaporoz'koho – Kn. 1, Kiev 1998.
- Mytsyk Y. Battle of Konotop 1659 // Ukrainske kozatstvo – Mala entsykolpedia, Kiev, 2006. pp. 297–298
- Smirnov N., «As under Konotop decline was made...»(myths and reality)
- Sokolov C. M. Continuation of reign of Alexi Mikhailovich. Chapter 1.
- Subtelny O. Ukraine. A history. University of Toronto press, 1994. ISBN 0-8020-0591-8.
- Velikanov, Vladimir S.; Lazarev, Yakov A. (2020). Царские воеводы и гарнизоны на Украине 1654-1669 [Tsarist voevodes and garrisons in Ukraine 1654-1669] (in Russian). Russian Academy of Sciences: Ratnoe delo. Moscow: Русские витязи. ISBN 978-5-907245-00-6.
- Davies, Brian (2007). Warfare, state and society on the Black Sea steppe, 1500–1700. Routledge, UK: Taylor & Francis. ISBN 978-0-415-23986-8.
- Smirnov, Nikolai (2007). Как под Конотопом упадок учинился (мифы и реальность) [How the decline took place under Konotop (myths and reality)]. Парад (in Russian). Труды по русской истории. Сборник статей в память о 60-летии И. В. Дубова.
- Uralanis, Boris (1960). Войны и народонаселение Европы: людские потери вооруженных сил Европейских стран в XVII-XX веках [Wars and the population of Europe: human losses of the armed forces of European countries in the XVII-XX centuries] (in Russian). Moscow: Социально-экономическая литература.
