= Boris Pushkin =

Boris Pushkin (Russian: Борис Иванович Пушкин; ca. 1590–1659) was a Russian diplomat and government official.

Between 1610 and 1619 Boris Pushkin was in Polish captivity together with Patriarch Filaret and other members of the Russian embassy. He was the head of the Great Embassy to Sweden in 1632–33, and in 1649 an envoy to Sweden. Pushkin was a deputy chief of the criminal police department ("Razboiny prikaz") under Yuri Suleshev (1630–34) and Yuri Sitsky (1641–42), and in 1646 became its chief. In 1635–39 he was a governor of Mangazeya.

Boris Pushkin was Aleksey Trubetskoy's brother-in-law.
