= Treaty of Hadiach =

1658 treaty between Poland–Lithuania and Cossacks

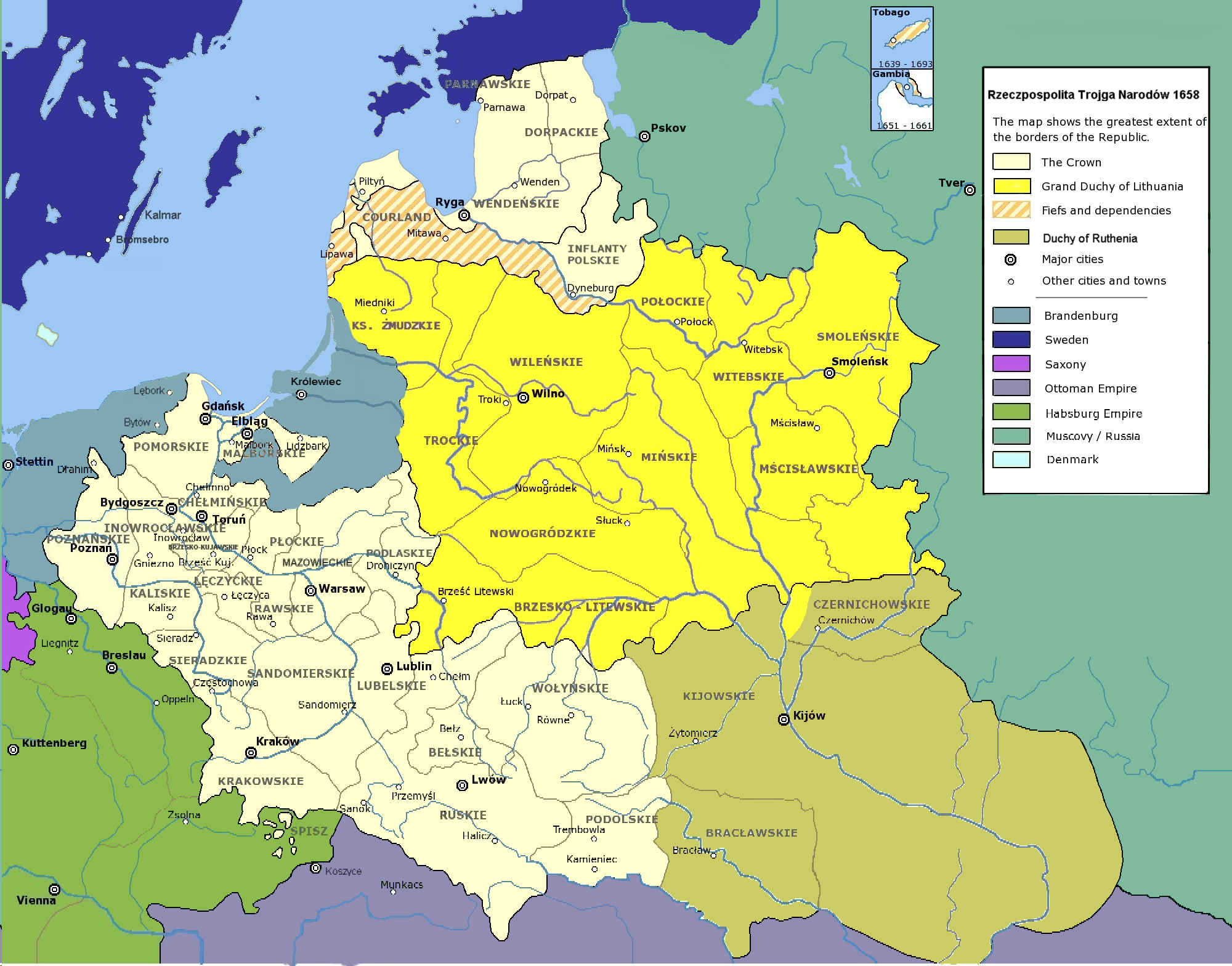
The Polish–Lithuanian–Ruthenian Commonwealth, established by the Treaty of Hadiach in 1658: Polish Crown Grand Duchy of Lithuania Grand Principality of Rus' or Ruthenia (the Cossack Hetmanate)

The Treaty of Hadiach (Polish: Unia hadziacka; Ukrainian: Гадяцький договір, romanized: Hadyatsʹkyy dohovir) was a treaty signed on 16 September 1658 in Hadiach, Cossack Hetmanate (present-day Ukraine) between representatives of the Polish–Lithuanian Commonwealth (Stanisław Kazimierz Bieniewski representing Poland and Kazimieras Liudvikas Jevlaševskis representing Lithuania) and Ukrainian Cossacks (represented by Hetman Ivan Vyhovsky and starshina Yuri Nemyrych, the architect of the treaty, and Pavlo Teteria).

It was designed to elevate the Cossacks (Ruthenians) to a position equal to that of Poland and Lithuania in the Polish–Lithuanian union and in fact transforming the Polish–Lithuanian Commonwealth into a Polish–Lithuanian–Ruthenian Commonwealth (Polish: Rzeczpospolita Trojga Narodów, lit. 'Republic of Three Nations'; Lithuanian: Trijų Tautų Respublika; Belarusian: Рэч Паспалітая трох народаў, romanized: Reč Paspalitaja troch narodaŭ; Ukrainian: Річ Посполита Трьох Народів, romanized: Rich Pospolyta Trʹokh Narodiv).

== Background ==
A way to establish a Grand Principality of Ruthenia was considered by the Ukrainian hetman Bohdan Khmelnytsky at various times, particularly during the 1648 Cossack insurrection against Polish rule in the mainly ethnically-Ukrainian territories (see Khmelnytsky Uprising). Hetman Vyhovsky supported the negotiations with the Commonwealth, especially after he suppressed a revolt led by colonel Martyn Pushkar of Poltava in June 1658, and severed relations with Tsardom of Russia for its violations of the Pereiaslav Agreement of 1654.

== Terms ==
Ratification of the Treaty of Hadiach by the Sejm and King John Casimir, 10 June 1659 (click for full PDF).

The list of points and humble requests that are submitted at his mercy by Serene Hetman of Zaporizhian Host along with the whole Zaporizhian Host and Ruthenian people to his royal mercy and the whole Rzeczpospolita:

1. Creation of the Grand Principality of Ruthenia (Ukrainian: Велике Князівство Руське) from the palatinates of Chernihiv, Bratslav and Kyiv, (Note: The Cossack negotiators had originally demanded that Ruthenian Voivodeship, Volhynian Voivodship, Belz Voivodeship, and Podolian Voivodeship be included as well) which along with the Kingdom of Poland and the Grand Duchy of Lithuania would be part of one and indivisible "Rzeczpospolita" (res publica, or Commonwealth) in equal rights.
2. The duchy was to be governed by the Hetman of the Zaporizhian Host, elected for life from among four candidates that were chosen by all estates of Ukrainian society and confirmed by the King of Poland.
3. In the duchy were to be established local offices in Polish manner.
4. In the duchy were to be restored law and courts as well as the administrative-territorial system of governing that existed prior to 1648.
5. The Grand Principality of Ruthenia shall not have rights to independent relations with other counties.
6. Individuals of Eastern Orthodox religion shall hold a senatorial seat.
7. It was permitted to establish own printing institutions of money with an image of one common king.
8. Number of own Armed Forces should be accounted for 60,000 of Cossacks and 10,000 of mercenaries.
9. There were to be restored a big landownership, serfdom and all obligatory duties that existed prior to 1648.
10. To the Cossack Estate were guaranteed the old rights and privileges and up to 100 Cossacks from each regiment (Note: there were 16 regiments) on request of the Hetman to be ennobled by the King.
11. The 1596 Church Union of Brest on the territory of the Grand Principality of Ruthenia was to be cancelled, (Note: Catholisation) announced the freedom of Eastern Orthodox and Catholic religions, to the Eastern Orthodox metropolitan bishop and 5 other bishops were granted permanent seats in common Senate of the Rzeczpospolita.
12. Polish and Lithuanian armed forces had no rights to be on the territory of the Grand Principality of Ruthenia except for emergencies and in such case, they would be subordinated to the Hetman.
13. Existence of 2 universities: the Kyiv-Mohyla Academy was to be granted the same rights as the Jagiellonian University of Kraków and a newly created college with status of university.
14. Nationwide it was permitted to establish colleges and gymnasiums with rights to teach in Latin. (Note: The official language of the Kingdom of Poland had been Latin exclusively until the 16th century, but it gradually shifted to Polish in the following centuries.)
15. Freedom of publishing as long as the published materials would not have personal attacks against the King.

According to the conditions proposed by the hetman Vyhovsky, Ukraine as an independent state called the Grand Duchy of Ruthenia was to join the confederation on equal terms with Poland and Lithuania. The territory of the Grand Duchy of Ruthenia consisted of the Kyiv, Bratslav and Chernihiv Voivodeships. The highest legislative power belonged to the national assembly of deputies, who were elected from all lands of the principality. Executive power was exercised by the hetman, who was elected for life and approved by the king. The selection of candidates for hetman was to be carried out jointly by all levels of Ukrainian society — the Cossacks, the nobility, and the clergy. The hetman headed the armed forces of Ukraine. In the Grand Principality of Ruthenia, the state positions of chancellor, marshal, sub-treasury and the highest judicial tribunal were established.

Orthodox believers were equal in rights with Catholics. The Greek Catholic Church was preserved, but could not spread to new territories. The Orthodox Metropolitan of Kyiv and five Orthodox bishops were to be given the right to sit in the common senate of the Commonwealth.

The agreement provided for the consolidation of the academic status of the Kyiv–Mohyla Academy and equalization of its rights with the University of Kraków. On the territory of the principality, it was planned to establish another Orthodox academy and secondary educational institutions — collegiums, as well as to fund the required number of primary schools and printing houses.

== Ratification ==
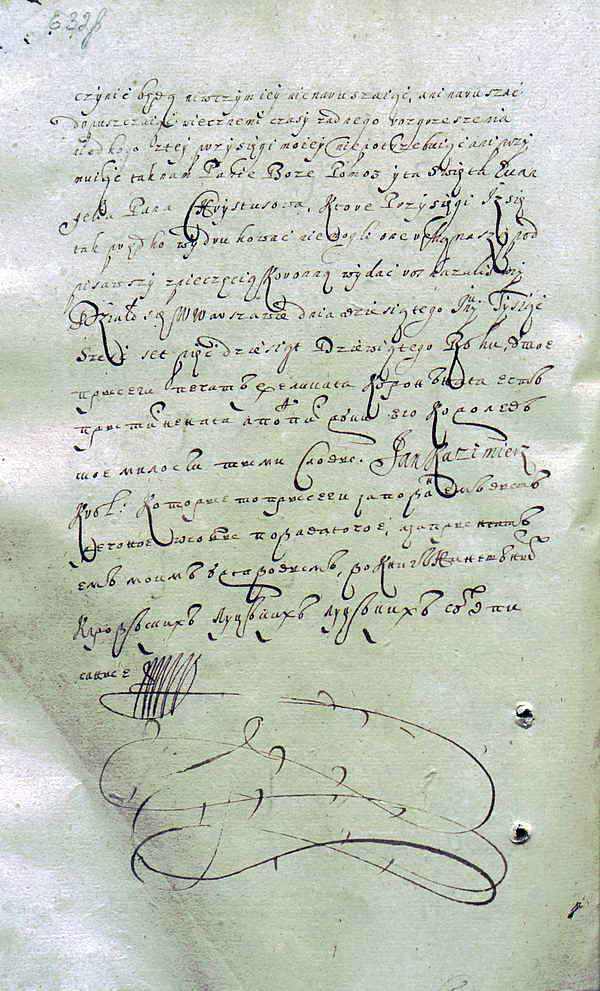
Oath of Polish king John II Casimir on the treaty of Hadiach, 10 June 1659.

The Treaty of Hadiach signed on 16 September 1658 in Hadiach between the representatives of the Polish–Lithuanian Commonwealth and the Cossack Hetmanate. The plan, as envisioned by Yuri Nemyrych, would have ennobled some Cossacks, who would then run the Grand Principality of Ruthenia.

In spite of considerable opposition by the Roman Catholic clergy, the Treaty of Hadiach was approved by the Polish king, and ratified by the Sejm (Diet) on 22 May 1659, but with a significantly amended text. The idea of a Ruthenian principality within the Commonwealth was completely abandoned, the Uniate Church would not be abolished, and the Cossacks had to give up their 1654 alliance with Muscovy. (Note: "Под влиянием польской общественности и сильного диктата Ватикана сейм в мае 1659 г. принял Гадячский договор в более чем урезанном виде. Идея Княжества Руського вообще была уничтожена, равно как и положение о сохранении союза с Москвой. Отменялась и ликвидация унии, равно как и целый ряд других позитивных статей." ("Under pressure from Polish public opinion and the Vatican's firm diktat, the Sejm adopted the Treaty of Hadiach in May 1659 in a severely watered-down form. The very idea of the Principality of Ruthenia was abolished, as was the provision for maintaining the alliance with Moscow. The abolition of the Union [of Brest] was also revoked, as were a number of other favourable clauses."))

Critically, hetman Ivan Vyhovsky could not get enough Cossacks to agree to keeping the Ruthenian Uniate Church, which the Catholic church refused to liquidate, but many Cossacks strongly opposed the idea.

== Responses ==
=== Muscovite invasion ===
The revised text of the Treaty as adopted by the Sejm meant an annulment of the 1654 Pereiaslav Agreement's arrangements, and thus renewed hostilities between the Commonwealth and the Tsardom of Russia. As Muscovy resumed its invasions in June 1659, the Union became critically endangered. Vyhovsky’s coalition of Cossacks, Crimean Tatars, Poles and Lithuanians succeeded in defeating the invading Muscovites and the Cossacks led by Yuriy Khmelnytsky at the Battle of Konotop on 29 June 1659. However, this initial victory proved to be insufficient, and was followed by a series of defeats. Moreover, a Zaporizhian attack on the Crimean Khanate forced Vyhovsky's Tatar allies to return home, and unrest broke out in the Poltava region.

=== Anti-Vyhovsky revolts ===
Several towns and regiments rebelled against Vyhovsky because of the amended terms of the Treaty of Hadiach. More and more Cossacks took issue with the extent to which the new terms deviated from what they had originally agreed to, and what had been signed on 16 September 1658. They defected to the pro-Russian camp of Khmelnytsky, who was actively supporting the Muscovites on the battlefield against Vyhovsky's pro-Polish coalition. By the end of the year, the Treaty's author Nemyrych was slain by Cossacks under his own command, and Vyhovsky was forced to resign as hetman and flee to Poland (October 1659).

=== Subsequent treaties ===
Vyhovsky's rival, Yuriy Khmelnytsky, signed the Pereiaslav Articles on 27 October 1659 with Muscovy, completely abandoning the idea of a Ruthenian Principality within the Commonwealth.

Following the Polish–Lithuanian victory in the Battle of Chudnov, representatives of the Commonwealth and the Cossack Hetmanate signed the Treaty of Chudnov (Slobodyshche) of 17 October 1660, which mostly repeated the terms of the 1658 Treaty of Hadiach and annulled the 1659 Pereiaslav Articles, but without the establishment of a Grand Principality of Ruthenia. The Hetmanate regained some autonomy, switched its allegiance back to the Commonwealth, and once more abandoned Muscovy. A Cossack council in Korsun-Shevchenkivskyi in Right-Bank Ukraine ratified the treaty, but the Left-Bank regiments led by Yakym Somko and Vasyl Zolotarenko continued their allegiance to Muscovy, thereby effectively splitting Ukraine along the Dnipro.

The Truce of Andrusovo (1667) ended the war, and confirmed the strategic situation: Ukraine was divided into the Right Bank, which remained part of the Polish-Lithuanian Commonwealth until its Second Partition in 1793, and the Left Bank, which, together with Kyiv on the Right Bank, became part of the Tsardom of Russia.

== Historiography ==
Generally speaking, the treaty was unsuccessful. Canadian historian Paul Robert Magocsi (1996) believed that happened because of the divisions among the Cossacks, and the resumption of the Russo-Polish War (1654–1667) due to Vyhovsky being forced to annul the 1654 alliance with Muscovy.

British historian Andrew Wilson (2000) called the Union of Hadiach "one of the great 'What-ifs?' of Ukrainian and East European history". He noted:

"If it had been successfully implemented, the Commonwealth would finally have become a loose confederation of Poles, Lithuanians and Ruthenians. The missing Ukrainian buffer state would have come into being as the Commonwealth's eastern pillar. Russian expansion might have been checked and Poland spared the agonies of the Partitions or, perhaps just as likely, it might have struggled on longer as the 'Sick man of Europe'".

American historican Timothy Snyder (2003) argued there had been a contradiction between "the republican world of Commonwealth courts and the democratic world of the Cossack steppe": Vyhovsky could not convince the masses of free Cossacks who would not be ennobled that the Union of Hadiach was in their best interest, and especially that the Uniate Church would be maintained, as the Catholic Church demanded, but the Cossacks rejected. According to Snyder, "although the Polish-Lithuanian parliament accepted the Hadiach Union, the Polish gentry lost interest in Union when it became clear that the hetmans did not really control the Cossacks, and the Cossacks did not really control Ukraine." To him, the failure of the Union of Hadiach marked the end of the Commonwealth's golden age of glory, prosperity and toleration that had begun in 1569.

Unlike traditional Russian historiography, Russian historian Tatiana Tairova-Yakovleva (2009) rejected the idea that Vyhovsky had been a "traitor"; rather, he had always been loyal to Bohdan Khmelnytskyi even since taking the oath to him and 1648, and Vyhovsky continued Khmelnytskyi's plans after his death in 1657. Tairova-Yakovleva regarded the resistance of Polish society and papal pressure as the reasons for the failure in ratification.

== 19th-century attempts ==
A 19th-century design for a coat of arms of a proposed Polish–Lithuanian–Ruthenian Commonwealth, which never came into being. It comprises the Polish White Eagle, Lithuanian Charging Knight, and Ruthenian Archangel Michael.

=== Second Treaty of Hadiach ===
In the aftermath of the November Uprising in 1831, there was an attempt to recreate the Treaty of Hadiach to form a Polish–Lithuanian–Ruthenian Commonwealth to throw off the partitions of Poland. It was then that the coat of arms of the proposed Commonwealth was created. The planned convention in Hadiach was declared illegal by the Russians, who stationed close to 2,000 soldiers there to ensure that no meetings or demonstrations took place, and they blocked passage through nearby bridges. Despite the precautions, a mass and a celebration involving 15–20,000 people and over 200 priests (both Catholic and Orthodox) took place near Hadiach.

=== Second Union of Horodło ===
The idea of a Polish–Lithuanian–Ruthenian Commonwealth revived during the January Uprising when a patriotic demonstration took place at Horodło in 1861. The so-called Second Union of Horodło was announced there by the szlachta of Congress Poland of the former Grand Duchy of Lithuania of Volhynia and of Podolia. The New Commonwealth, based on the Second Union of Horodło, was to be based on the three nations, and its proposed coat of arms included the Polish eagle, the Lithuanian Pahonia, and the patron saint of Ruthenia, the Archangel Michael.

== Maps ==
The Republic of Three Nations, established by the Treaty of Hadiach:
Polish Crown
Grand Duchy of Lithuania
Grand Principality of Rus' or Ruthenia (the Cossack Hetmanate)

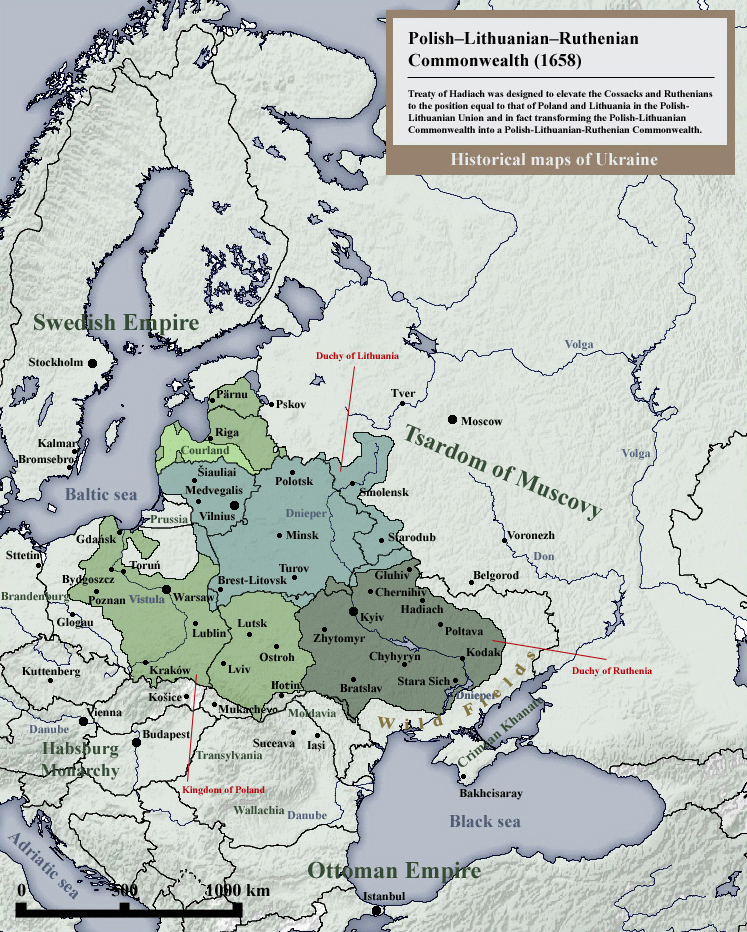
Polish–Lithuanian–Ruthenian Commonwealth, or Commonwealth of Three Nations (1658).
Polish Crown
Grand Duchy of Lithuania
Grand Principality of Ruthenia (the Cossack Hetmanate)
Duchy of Courland

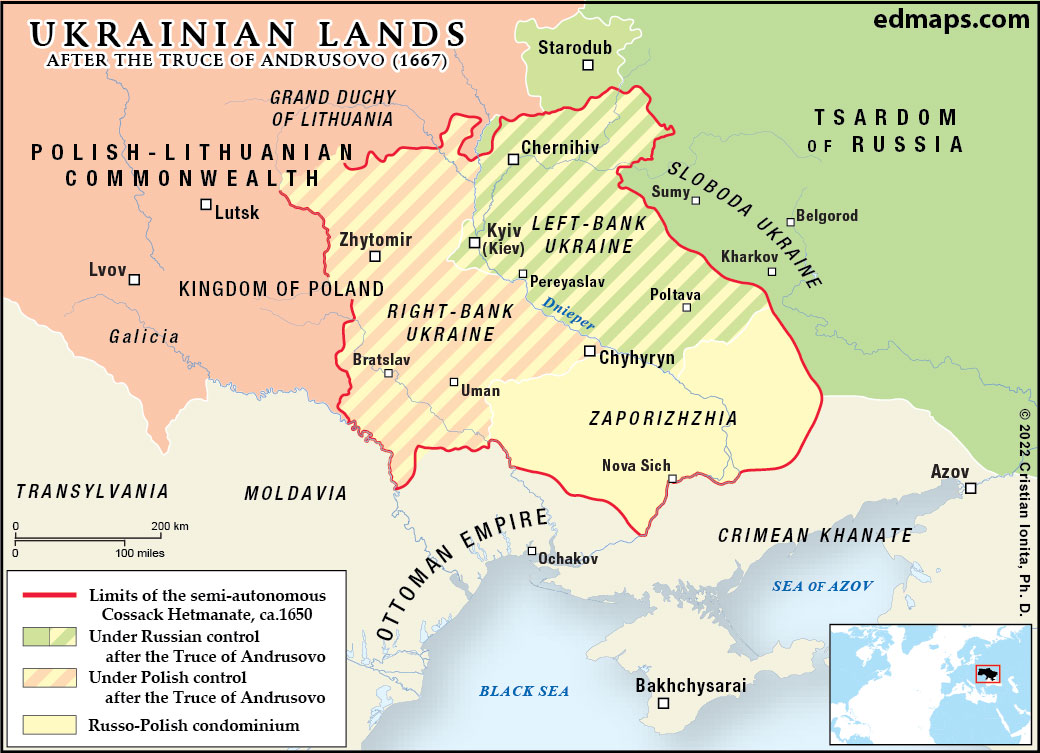
Division of the Ukrainian lands under the Truce of Andrusovo (1667). In 1669, Russia violated the 1667 treaty by refusing to return the city of Kyiv to Poland.

== See also ==
- The Ruin (Ukrainian history)#List of treaties
- Intermarium
- Polish–Lithuanian–Muscovite Commonwealth
- Ruthenian Voivodeship
- Lublin Triangle
- British–Polish–Ukrainian trilateral pact

== Literature ==
- Kohut, Zenon E. (2009). "Mazepa's Ukraine: Understanding Cossack Territorial Vistas". Harvard Ukrainian Studies. 31 (1/4). Harvard Ukrainian Research Institute: 1–28. ISSN 0363-5570. JSTOR 41756495.
- Magocsi, Paul Robert (1996). A History of Ukraine. Seattle: University of Washington press. ISBN 0-295-97580-6.
- Subtelny, Orest (1988). Ukraine: A History. Toronto: University of Toronto Press. ISBN 0-8020-5808-6. excerpts online
- Plokhy, Serhii (2006). The Origins of the Slavic Nations: Premodern Identities in Russia, Ukraine, and Belarus (PDF). New York: Cambridge University Press. pp. 10–15. ISBN 978-0-521-86403-9. Archived (PDF) from the original on 6 June 2011.
- Snyder, Timothy (2003). The Reconstruction of Nations: Poland, Ukraine, Lithuania, Belarus, 1569-1999. Yale University Press. p. 367. ISBN 978-0-300-10586-5.
- Tairova-Yakovleva, Tatiana (2009). "Иван Выговский" [Ivan Vyhovsky]. Edinorog: materialy po voennoĭ istorii Vostochnoĭ Evropy ėpokhi Srednikh vekov i Rannego Novogo vremeni, vyp. 1 Единорогъ. Материалы по военной истории Восточной Европы эпохи Средних веков и Раннего Нового времени, вып.1 [The Unicorn. Materials on the Military History of Eastern Europe in the Middle Ages and Early Modern Period, Vol. 1] (in Russian). Moscow: Kvadriga. pp. 249–253. ISBN 978-5-91791-002-4. OCLC 470844439.
- Wilson, Andrew (2000). The Ukrainians: Unexpected Nation. New Haven: Yale University Press. p. 366. ISBN 978-0-300-08355-2. review online
