= Aleksey Trubetskoy =

17th-century Russian Army officer and voivode

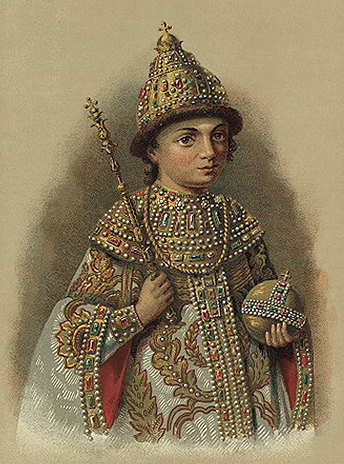
Aleksey Trubetskoy was the godfather of Peter I of Russia. Young Peter with royal regalia.

Prince Aleksey Nikitich Trubetskoy (Russian: Алексей Никитич Трубецкой; c. 17 March 1600 – 1680) was the last voivode of the Trubetskoy family and a diplomat who was active in negotiations with Poland and Sweden in 1647 and with the ambassadors of Bohdan Khmelnytsky in 1654. He was the godfather of Peter I of Russia.

Under Tsar Michael's rule Aleksey Trubetskoy was in disfavour with the powerful Patriarch Filaret and was appointed to govern distant towns of Tobolsk and Astrakhan. But the situation changed after Michael's death in 1645 and Alexis I's succession to the throne, when Trubetskoy's close friend Boris Morozov became a head of government. In 1646, Trubetskoy was appointed a commander of the Tsar's personal Guard regiment.

In 1654, Prince Aleksey Trubetskoy on the side of Alexis I of Russia led the southern flank of the Russian army from Bryansk to the Grand Duchy of Lithuania. The territory between the Dniepr and Berezyna rivers was overrun quickly, with Aleksey Trubetskoy taking Mścisław and Rosławl. He defeated both Lithuanian Hetmans Janusz Radziwiłł and Korwin Gosiewski in the Battle of Shepeleviche. In 1654, the former Principality of Trubetsk was conquered by Aleksey Trubetskoy, Prince of Trubetsk himself, as a result of the Russo-Polish War (1654-1667).

In 1656, the second Russian army under the command of Trubetskoy advanced in the north of Swedish Livonia, besieged and captured Tartu. In 1659, a Russian army led by Aleksey Trubetskoy and Ukrainian cossacks under the command of Ivan Bezpaly crossed into Ukraine and were partly defeated in a surprise attack by a large Polish-Tatar-Cossack army led by Mehmed IV Giray and Ivan Vyhovsky in the Battle of Konotop. The same year, he negotiated the Second Treaty of Pereiaslav with Yurii Khmelnytsky.

Trubetskoy was married to Ekaterina Pushkina (died in 1669), a sister of Boyar Boris Pushkin, a prominent statesman. The mother of Aleksey was Eudokia Trubetskaya and his father was Nikita Trubetskoy (16th century – January 1608). He had brothers Wigund-Jeronym Trubetsky and Fyodor Trubetskoy. He had no children and died in 1680, having previously accepted a monastic vow. Thus the Principality of Trubetsk returned to the possession of the Tsar.
