= Ivan Vyhovsky =

Hetman (ruler) of the Zaporizhian Host from 1657 to 1659

- Іван Виговський
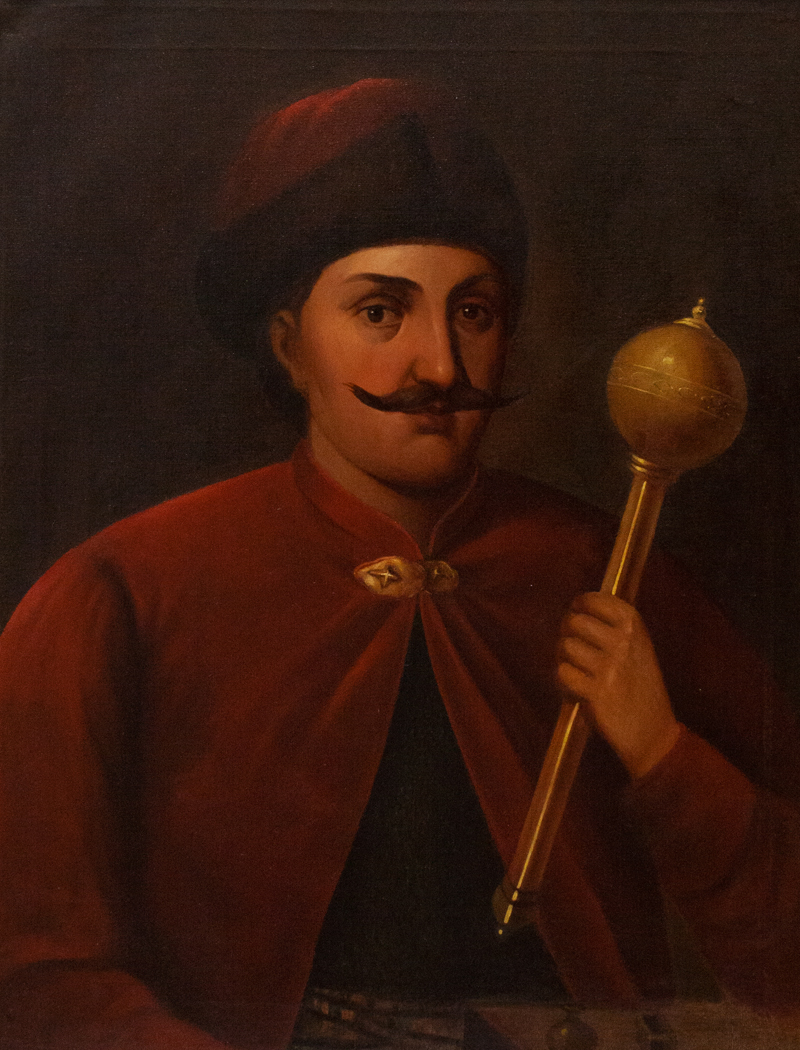
- Portrait by Havrylo Vasko, 1850

Hetman of Zaporizhian Host
- In office 21 October 1657 – 17 October 1659
- Preceded by: Yurii Khmelnytsky
- Succeeded by: Yurii Khmelnytsky

Personal details
- Born: beginning of the 17th century Vyhiv, Polish–Lithuanian Commonwealth
- Died: 16 March 1664 Vilkhivka near Korsun, Cossack Hetmanate
- Spouse: Olena Vyhovska
- Children: Mariana, Ostap
- Parent: Ostap Vyhovsky
- Education: Kyiv-Mohyla Academy
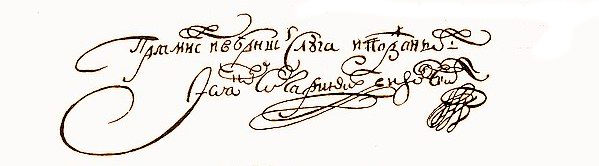
- Signature

Ivan Vyhovsky (Ruthenian: Іоан Виговский / Іоан Виговскій / Іоан(ъ) Выговскій / Иоан Виговс(ъ)кий; Ukrainian: Іван Виговський; Polish: Iwan Wyhowski / Jan Wyhowski; date of birth unknown, died 1664), served as hetman of the Zaporozhian Host (1657-1659), leading the Cossack Hetmanate during the Russo-Polish War (1654–1667).

Vyhovsky belonged to an Orthodox noble family from Vyhiv near Ovruch in modern Zhytomyr Oblast. He succeeded the famous hetman and rebel leader Bohdan Khmelnytsky. His time as hetman was characterized by generally pro-Commonwealth policies and an attempt to establish a sovereign Grand Principality of Ruthenia within it by the Treaty of Hadiach (16 September 1658). However, when the Sejm of the Commonwealth unilaterally altered the terms of the treaty without his knowledge or consent in May 1659, an invasion by the Tsardom of Russia and revolts amongst the Zaporizhian Cossacks in the south eventually led to the end of his hetmanship in October 1659.

== Biography ==
=== Early life and career ===
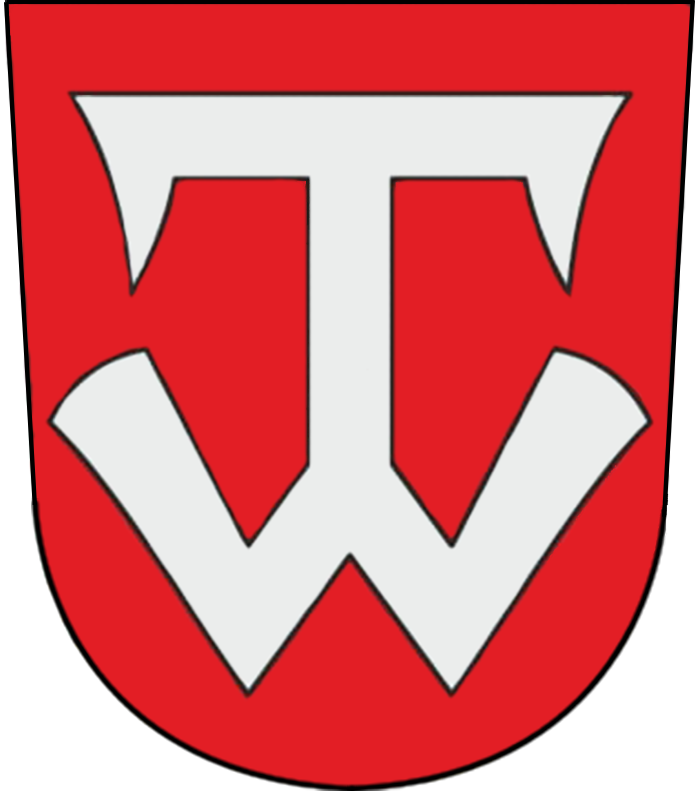
Vyhovsky family coat of arms.

Ivan Vyhovsky was born in his family estate of Vyhiv, near Ovruch in the Kyiv Voivodeship of the Polish–Lithuanian Commonwealth, a son of Ostap Vyhovsky, a vicegerent of the Kyiv fortress under voivode Adam Kisiel and an Orthodox nobleman from the Kyiv region. There is also a possibility that his birth occurred at another family estate, Hoholiv, located near Kyiv (now Brovary Raion).

Vyhovsky studied at the Kyiv Brotherhood Collegium and excelled in languages (including Church Slavonic, Polish, Latin and Russian, in addition to Ukrainian) and calligraphy. He later was the main financial supporter of the Collegium.

Vyhovsky started his career as a lawyer and chancellery worker in Lutsk. By early 1648 he was serving as a scribe for the government commissar tasked with supervising Registered Cossacks.

=== Rise to hetmanship ===
Vyhovsky was captured by Khmelnystsky's rebel Cossack forces at the Battle of Zhovti Vody in May 1648. He was freed on account of his education and experience and rose to become secretary-general or chancellor (Ukrainian: генеральний писар, romanized: heneralnyi pysar) of the Cossacks and one of Khmelnytsky's closest advisors. In September 1651 Vyhovsky took head of the Cossack delegation during peace negotiations with representatives of the Polish Crown, which led to the conclusion of the Treaty of Bila Tserkva. In 1655, Vyhovsky led negotiations with representatives of the Lviv magistrate during the Cossack siege of the city.

Elected hetman upon the death of Khmelnytsky, Vyhovsky sought to find a counterbalance to the pervasive Russian influence, which Moscow exerted over Ukraine following the 1654 Treaty of Pereiaslav. While the Cossack elite and the ecclesiastical authorities supported his pro-Polish orientation, the masses and the Cossack rank-and-file remained deeply suspicious and resentful of the Poles by whom they had long been forced into serfdom. As a result, Zaporozhian Cossacks, led by Yakiv Barabash, put forward an alternative candidate for the hetmancy: Martyn Pushkar, colonel of the Poltava Cossack regiment. The rebellion against the hetman grew and came to a head when Vyhovsky's forces clashed with the pro-Russian Cossacks in June 1658. Vyhovsky's forces prevailed, killing Pushkar and forcing Barabash to flee, where he would later be captured and executed. This conflict resulted in 50,000 deaths.

Following the death of Sylvester Kosiv in 1657, Vyhovsky supported the election of Dionysius Balaban to the post of the Metropolitan of Kyiv.

=== Treaty of Hadiach and downfall ===
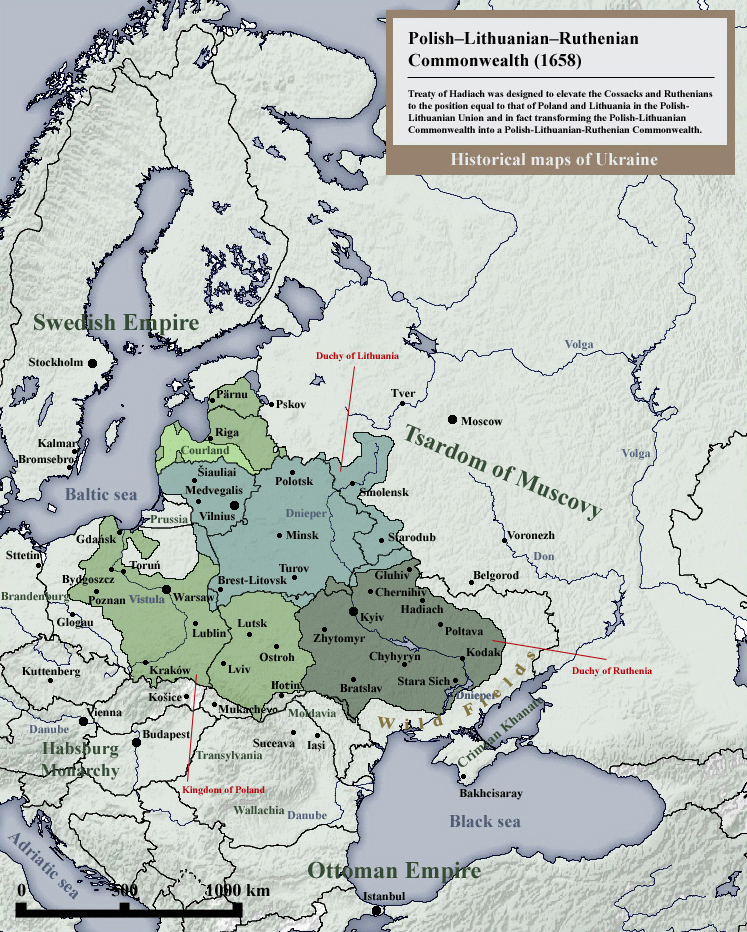
Polish–Lithuanian–Ruthenian Commonwealth or Republic of Three Nations (1658): Polish Crown Grand Duchy of Lithuania Grand Principality of Ruthenia (the Cossack Hetmanate) Duchy of Courland

After his consolidation of power within Ukraine, Vyhovsky attempted to reach an acceptable agreement with the Poles. Encouraged by his aristocratic friend Yuri Nemyrych, Vyhovsky entered negotiations with the Polish government, which resulted in the Treaty of Hadiach, which was signed on 16 September 1658. Under the conditions of the treaty, Ukraine as the Grand Duchy of Ruthenia would become a third and autonomous component of the Polish–Lithuanian Commonwealth, under the ultimate sovereignty of the King of Poland, but with its own military, courts and treasury. Additionally, adherents of the Orthodox faith were to receive equal consideration as Catholics. As such, the signed treaty would have assured the Cossacks of autonomy and dignity to an extent they had not known previously.

However, the Treaty of Hadiach was never implemented. After its signing of a massive Russian army (according to some sources up to 150,000 soldiers) led by the Muscovite boyar Aleksei Trubetskoi, the army crossed into Ukraine and besieged Konotop. In response, Vyhovsky led 60,000 Cossacks against the Russians alongside his Polish as well as 40,000 Tatar allies. Near Konotop, the Russians were defeated, losing 20,000–30,000 men. However, Vyhovsky was not able to capitalize on his victory, as the Russian garrisons in several Cossack towns continued to hold out, and his Tatar allies were forced to return to Crimea after it was attacked by independent Cossacks. Several powerful colonels, including Ivan Bohun, opposed Vyhovsky, and his close ally Nemyrych was killed in a fight with the hetman's opponents.

On 20 September 1659 a Black council with the involvement of Cossacks from Zaporozhian Sich gathered near Hermanivka and accused Vyhovsky of "selling Ukraine to the Poles." Two of Vyhovsky's representatives were atacked and killed, and the hetman himself had to flee the assembly. A few days later Yurii Khmelnytsky was proclaimed hetman at a starshyna council in Bila Tserkva. After this decision, Vyhovsky was forced to concede and transferred his symbols of power to Khmelnytsky.

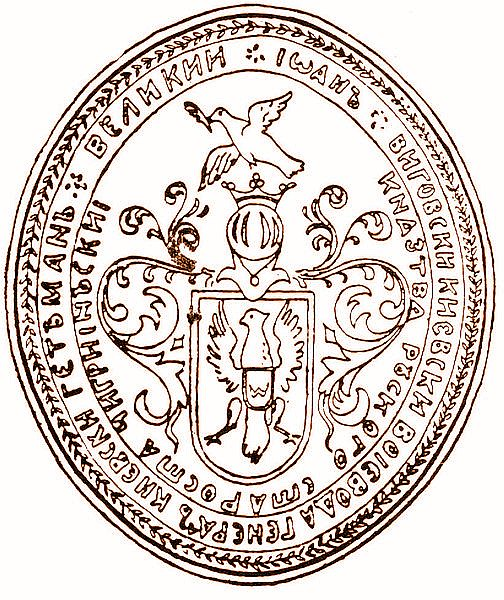
Seal used by Vyhovsky during his term as voivode of Kyiv

=== Later career ===
In 1660, Vyhovsky was appointed Voivode of Kyiv and took part in the Battle of Chudniv on the side of the Crown Army. Kyiv itself was held by the Russian troops after Voivodes Vasily Sheremetev and Yury Baryatinsky managed to repel two assaults by Vyhovsky and one Polish assault on the city. In 1662 Vyhovsky accompanied field hetman Jerzy Lubomirski in Lviv. Vyhovsky opposed the rise of Pavlo Teteria to the post of hetman, as a result of which Teteria's forces captured and shot him without trial on 26 March 1664. Teteria defended his execution of the former hetman, who had enjoyed legal immunity as a senator, claiming that Vyhovsky had been encouraging riots against his rule.

== Personal life and family ==
According to memoirs of a contemporary, Vyhovsky was of a tall stature, had a big nose and a yellow beard.

Vyhovsky's father, Ostap, had four other sons: Danylo, Kostiantyn, Fedir and Vasyl They had also served in the Zaporozhian Host. Ostap also had a daughter. Danylo Vyhovsky was married to Olena, one of the daughters of Bohdan Khmelnytsky, and served as colonel of Bykhiv. After Ivan's deposition from hetmanship, he was captured by Muscovite streltsy and tortured to death, with his mutilated body later being sent to his wife in Subotiv. Danylo Vyhovsky's murder contributed to the eventual breakdown of relations with Moscow under Ivan's successor Yuriy Khmelnytsky. Danylo's widow later remarried to Pavlo Teteria, hetman of Right-bank Ukraine. Other siblings of Vyhovsky were exiled to Siberia after his downfall.

== Legacy ==
Vyhovsky was criticized for leading to the devastation of "Little Russia" in the chronicle written by Samiilo Velychko, which included fictional letters supposedly issued by the hetman.

Many Ukrainian cities like Kyiv have a street named after Vyhovsky.

== See also ==
- Hetman of Zaporizhian Cossacks
- The Ruin (Ukrainian history)

== Sources ==
- Subtelny, Orest (1988). Ukraine: A History. Toronto: University of Toronto Press. ISBN 0802058086.
- "Vyhovsky" at Encyclopedia of Ukraine
- Гумилев, Лев (2023). От Руси к России. Moscow: Москва. ISBN 978-5-17-153845-3.
- Plokhy, Serhii (2022). The Gates of Europe: A History of Ukraine. New York, NY: Basic Books. p. 414. ISBN 978-0-465-07394-8.

Preceded by Jan "Sobiepan" Zamoyski	Voivode of Kyiv; 1660–1664	Succeeded by Stefan Czarniecki
Preceded by Yurii Khmelnytsky	Hetman of Ukraine; 1657–1659	Succeeded by Yurii Khmelnytsky
Preceded by post established	Chancellor General; 1649–1657	Succeeded by Ivan Hrusha
