= Grand Principality of Rus' (1658) =

Monarchy proposed in 1658

Grand Principality of Rus' Велике Князівство Руське Wielkie Księstwo Ruskie Didžioji Rusijos Kunigaikštystė
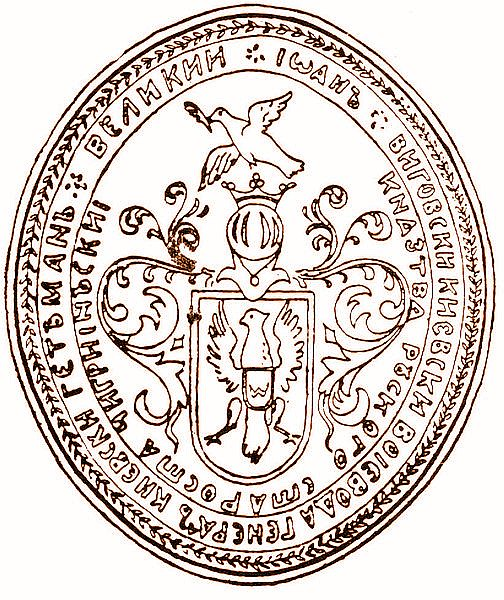
- Coat of arms
- Capital: Chyhyryn
- Religion: Eastern Orthodoxy (Metropolis of Kyiv)
- Government: Oligarchic Elective Monarchy

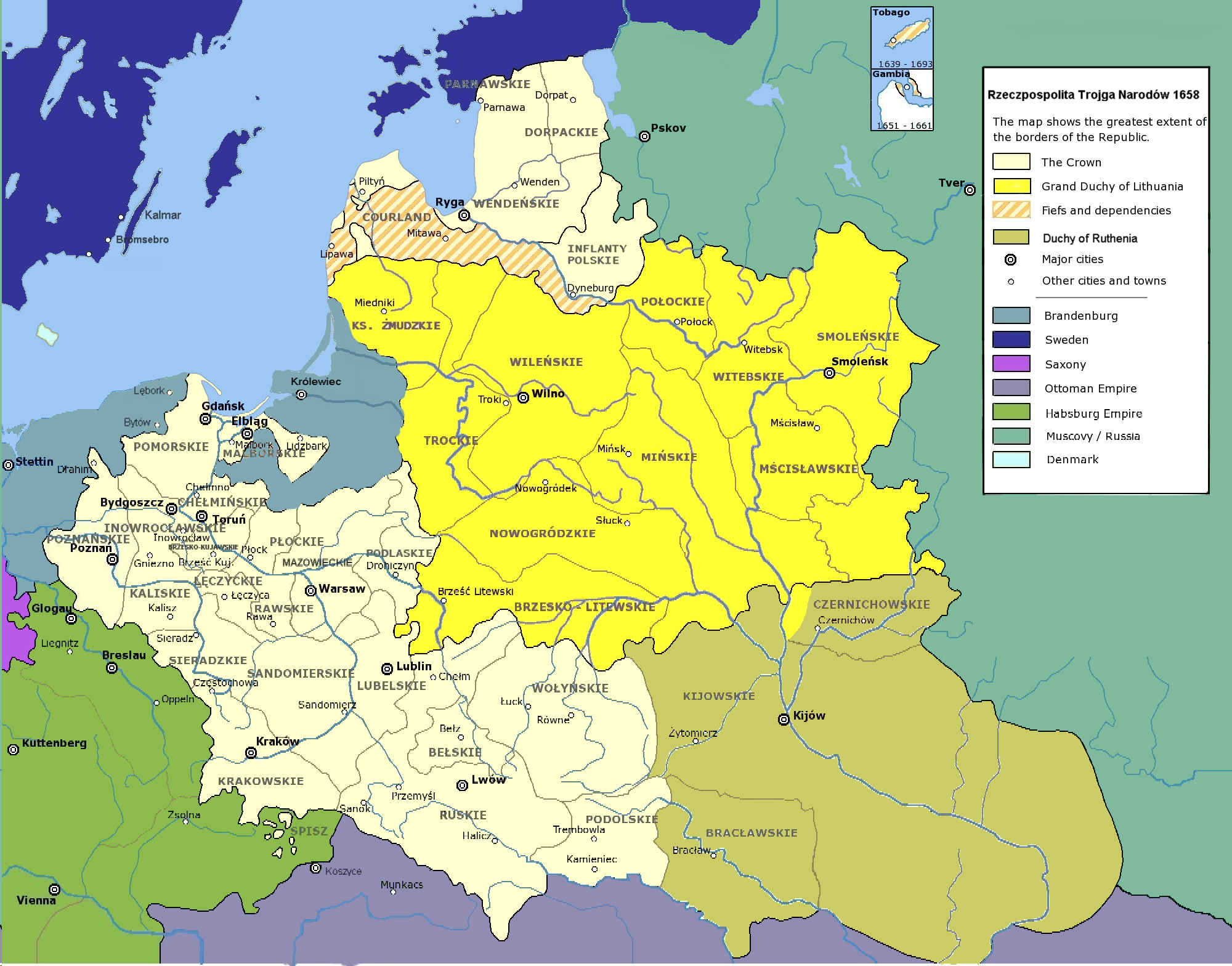
The Polish–Lithuanian–Ruthenian Commonwealth, established by the Treaty of Hadiach in 1658: Polish Crown Grand Duchy of Lithuania Grand Principality of Rus' or Ruthenia (the Cossack Hetmanate)

Grand Principality of Rus' (Ukrainian: Велике Князівство Руське, romanized: Velyke Knyazivstvo Rusʹke; Polish: Wielkie Księstwo Ruskie; Lithuanian: Didžioji Rusijos Kunigaikštystė), also known in historiography as Grand Principality of Ruthenia, was the project of transforming the Cossack Hetmanate into a member state of the Polish–Lithuanian–Ruthenian Commonwealth in the territory of Kiev Voivodeship, Bracław Voivodeship and Chernihiv Voivodeship. Its creation was proposed by Hetman Ivan Vyhovsky with Yuri Nemyrych and Pavlo Teteria in September 1658 during the negotiations between the Cossack Hetmanate and the Commonwealth. The project of the Duchy was approved in the first version of the Treaty of Hadiach, but later, because of the strong resistance of Polish society, the idea of the Grand Principality of Rus was completely abandoned. The Cossacks were very disappointed with the final version of the treaty and The Ruin began. Yuri Nemyrych, the alleged author of the Grand Principality of Rus project, was killed in a local fight in August 1659 and Vyhovsky lost his power in October 1659, thus the project did not become a reality.

== Maps ==
The Republic of Three Nations, established by the Treaty of Hadiach:
Polish Crown
Grand Duchy of Lithuania
Grand Principality of Rus' or Ruthenia (the Cossack Hetmanate)

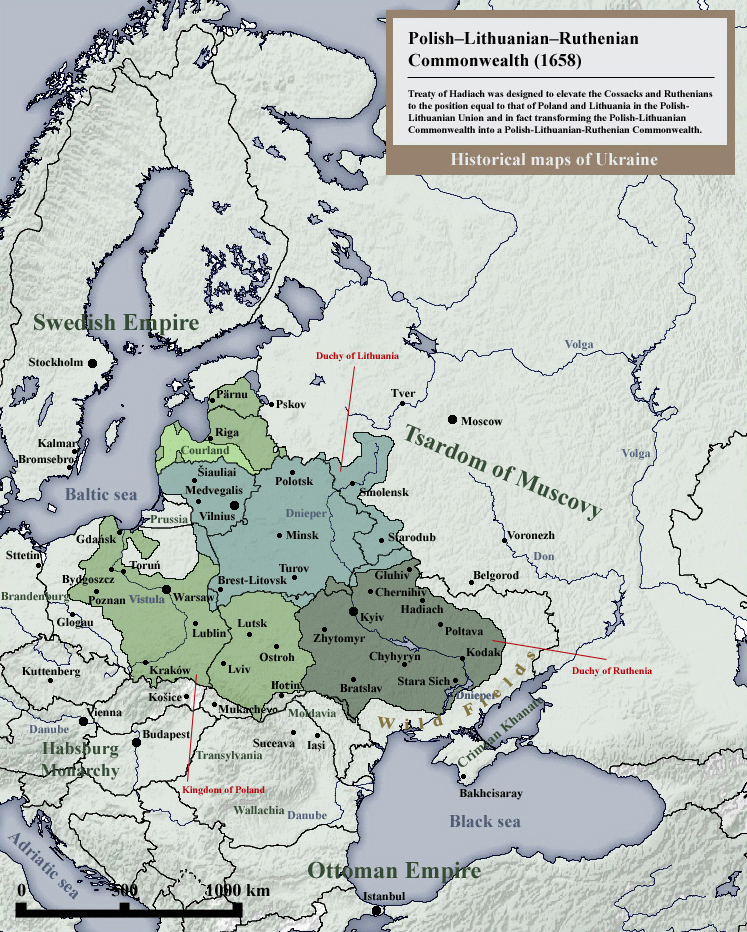
Polish–Lithuanian–Ruthenian Commonwealth, or Commonwealth of Three Nations (1658).
Polish Crown
Grand Duchy of Lithuania
Grand Principality of Ruthenia (the Cossack Hetmanate)
Duchy of Courland

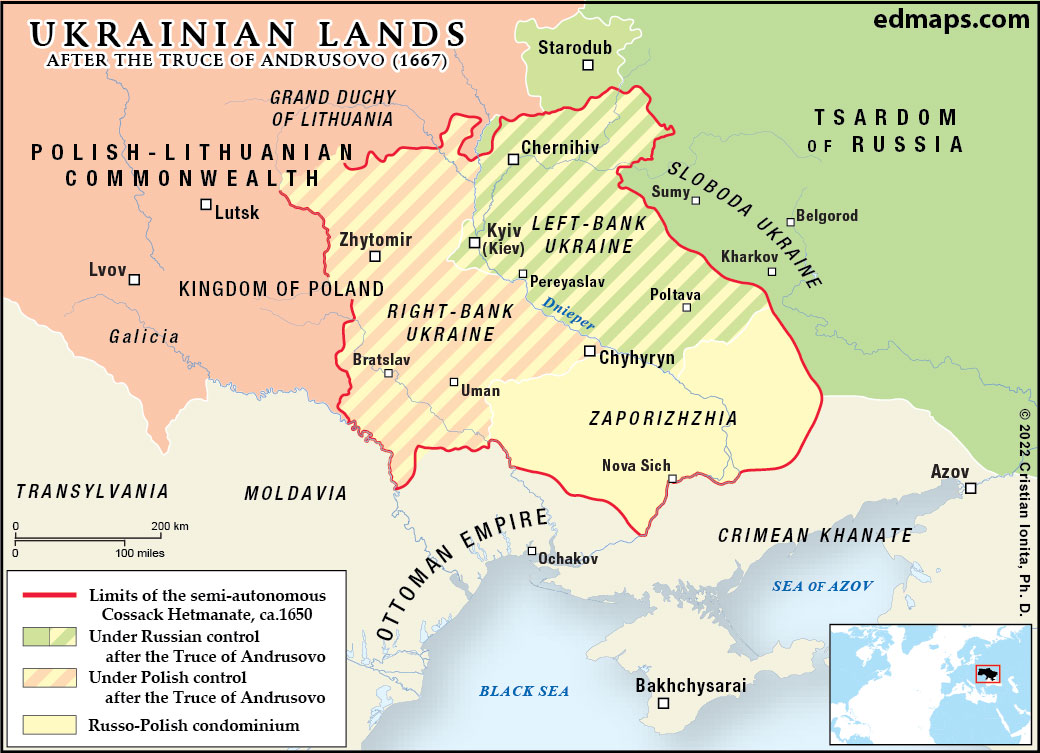
Division of the Ukrainian lands under the Truce of Andrusovo (1667). In 1669, Russia violated the 1667 treaty by refusing to return the city of Kyiv to Poland.

== See also ==
- Treaty of Hadiach

== Sources ==
- Piotr Kroll, Od ugody hadziackiej do Cudnowa. Kozaczyzna między Rzecząpospolitą a Moskwą w latach 1658–1660, Warszawa: Wydawnictwa Uniwersytetu Warszawskiego, 2008.
- Mariusz Robert Drozdowski (2015): Rzeczypospolita wobec idei odnowienia unii hadziackiej w latach 1660–1682
- Plokhy, Serhii (2006). The Origins of the Slavic Nations: Premodern Identities in Russia, Ukraine, and Belarus (PDF). New York: Cambridge University Press. pp. 10–15. ISBN 978-0-521-86403-9. Archived (PDF) from the original on 6 June 2011.
- Snyder, Timothy (2003). The Reconstruction of Nations: Poland, Ukraine, Lithuania, Belarus, 1569-1999. Yale University Press. p. 367. ISBN 978-0-300-10586-5.
- Tairova-Yakovleva, Tatiana (2009). "Иван Выговский" [Ivan Vyhovsky]. Edinorog: materialy po voennoĭ istorii Vostochnoĭ Evropy ėpokhi Srednikh vekov i Rannego Novogo vremeni, vyp. 1 Единорогъ. Материалы по военной истории Восточной Европы эпохи Средних веков и Раннего Нового времени, вып.1 [The Unicorn. Materials on the Military History of Eastern Europe in the Middle Ages and Early Modern Period, Vol. 1] (in Russian). Moscow: Kvadriga. pp. 249–253. ISBN 978-5-91791-002-4. OCLC 470844439.
